= List of Royal Navy vessels active in 1981 =

The following vessels were in commission, planned or under construction for Her Majesty's Royal Navy in 1981.

== Aircraft Carriers ==
- Centaur-class – Hermes. (Note: Under refit for conversion to STOVL carrier with addition of 7.5° ski ramp.)
- Invincible-class – Invincible, Illustrious, (Note: In Build.) & Ark Royal. (Note: Laid Down.)

== Destroyers ==
- Type 82 – Bristol.
- Type 42 – Sheffield, Birmingham, Newcastle, Glasgow, Exeter, Southampton, Liverpool, Cardiff, & Coventry.
- County-class – London, Antrim, Glamorgan, Fife & Norfolk.

== Frigates ==
- Type 22 – Broadsword, Battleaxe, Brilliant, Brazen, Boxer & Beaver.
- Type 21 – Amazon, Antelope, Active, Ambuscade, Arrow, Alacrity, Ardent & Avenger.
- Leander-class (Type 12I) –
  - Batch 1 (Ikara Group): Aurora, Euryalus, Galatea, Arethusa, Naiad, Dido, Leander & Ajax.
  - Batch 2 (Exocet Group): Cleopatra, Sirius, Phoebe, Minerva, Danae, Juno, Argonaut & Penelope.
  - Batch 3 (Broad-Beamed Group): Achilles, Diomede, Andromeda, Hermione, Jupiter, Bacchante, Apollo, Scylla, Ariadne & Charybdis.
- Rothesay-class – Yarmouth, Lowestoft, Brighton, Rothesay, Londonderry, Falmouth, Berwick, Plymouth & Rhyl.
- Salisbury-class – Lincoln. (Note: Reserve in Stand-by Squadron.)
- Whitby-class – Torquay. (Note: Navigation/Direction training and trials ship, Portsmouth.)

== Amphibious Units ==
- Fearless-class landing platform dock – Fearless & Intrepid.
- Round Table-class landing ship logistics (Note: RFA crewed vessels in support of Fearless-class landing ships.) (RFA) – Sir Bedivere, Sir Galahad, Sir Geraint, Sir Lancelot, Sir Percivale & Sir Tristram.
- Logistic Landing Craft (RCT) – HMAV Ardennes & HMAV Arakan.
- LCM (9) Type – 14 craft
- LCM (7) Type – 2 craft
- Avon-class RPL – Avon, Bude, Clyde, Dart, Eden, Forth, Glen, Hamble, Itchen, Kennet, London & Medway.
- LCVP –
  - LCVP 1: 9 craft
  - LCVP 2: 8 craft
  - LCVP 3: 9 craft
- LCP(R) – 3 craft

== Mine Warfare Forces ==
- Abdiel. (Note: Exercise Mine Layer – Could operate as operational mine layer if required.)
- Hunt-class – Brecon, Ledbury, Cattistock, Cottesmore, Brocklesby, Middleton, Chiddingfold, Dulverton & Hurworth.
- Wilton. (Note: Prototype Coastal Minesweeper/Hunter.)
- Ton-class –
  - Mine Hunters: Bilderston, Brereton, (Note: Vessels belong to Royal Navy Reserve.) Brinton, Bronington, Bossington, Gavinton, Hubberston, Iverston, Kedleston, Kellington, Kirkliston, Maxton, Nurton & Sheraton.
  - Minesweepers: Alfringston, Bickington, Crichton, Cuxton, Glasserton, Hodgeston, Laleston, Pollington, Shavington, Upton, Walkerton, Wotton, Soberton, Stubbington, Lewiston & Crofton.
- Venturer-class – St. David & Venturer.
- Ley-class – Aveley.
- Ham-class – Dittisham, Flintham & Thornham.

== Ice Patrol Ship ==
- Endurance

== Offshore Patrol Vessels ==
- Castle-class - Leeds Castle, Dumbarton Castle
- Island-class - HMS Anglesey, HMS Alderney, HMS Jersey, HMS Guernsey, HMS Shetland, HMS Orkney, HMS Lindisfarne

== Submarine Service ==
- Resolution-class (Note: Replacement announced on 15 July 1980 for 4 or 5 new build boats to carry Trident missiles.) – Resolution, Repulse, Renown & Revenge.
- Trafalgar-class – Trafalgar, Turbulent, + 1.
- Swiftsure-class – Swiftsure, Sovereign, Superb, Sceptre, Spartan & Splendid.
- Valiant-class – Valiant & Warspite.
- Churchill-class – Churchill, Conqueror & Courageous.
- Dreadnought
- Oberon-class – Oberon, Odin, Orpheus, Olympus, Osiris, Onslaught, Otter, Oracle, Ocelot, Otus, Opossum, Opportune & Onyx.
- Porpoise-class – Porpoise, Sealion & Walrus.

== See also ==
- List of Royal Navy vessels active in 1982
