= List of Royal Navy vessels active in 1982 =

The following vessels were in commission, planned or under construction for HM Royal Navy in 1982. Many of these vessels took part in the 1982 Falklands War.

== Aircraft Carriers ==
- Centaur-class – Hermes.
- Invincible-class – Invincible, Illustrious, (Note: Commissioned whilst underway on 20 June 1982.) & Ark Royal. (Note: In Build, launched 2 June 1981.)

The carriers Hermes and Invincible were deployed to the Falkland Islands in April 1982 as the centre piece of Rear Admiral Woodward's Carrier Battle Group. Illustrious deployed to the Falkland Islands in late summer 1982 to relieve Invincible.

== Destroyers ==
- Type 82 – Bristol.
- Type 42 – Sheffield, Birmingham, Newcastle, Glasgow, Exeter, Southampton, Liverpool, Cardiff, Coventry & Manchester (commissioned in December 1982) and four more fitting-out/in-build as of end-1982.
- County-class – Antrim, Glamorgan & Fife.

The destroyers Bristol, Sheffield, Coventry, Exeter, Cardiff, Glasgow, Antrim & Glamorgan were all present in the South Atlantic during the Falklands War.

Sheffield and Coventry were lost to enemy action, Sheffield by air launched Exocet missile and Coventry to bombs. Glamorgan was struck by a modified air-launch Exocet from a land-based launcher causing extensive damage, however she was not crippled.

== Frigates ==
- Type 22 – Broadsword, Battleaxe, Brilliant & Brazen, Boxer, (Note: In Build.) & Beaver + 2 planned.
- Type 21 – Amazon, Antelope, Active, Ambuscade, Arrow, Alacrity, Ardent & Avenger.
- Leander-class (Type 12I) –
  - Batch 1 (Ikara Group): Aurora, Euryalus, Galatea, Arethusa, Naiad, Dido, Leander, & Ajax.
  - Batch 2 (Exocet Group): Cleopatra, Sirius, Phoebe, Minerva, Danae, Juno, Argonaut, & Penelope
  - Batch 3 (Broad-Beamed Group): Achilles, Diomede, Andromeda, Hermione, Jupiter, Apollo, Scylla, Ariadne, & Charybdis
- Rothesay-class – Yarmouth, Lowestoft, (Note: Trials Ship.) Brighton, Rothesay, Londonderry, Falmouth, Berwick^{Stand-by Squadron}, Plymouth, & Rhyl.
- Whitby-class – Torquay & Eastbourne^{Harbour training ship.}
- Type 81 - Gurkha, Tartar & Zulu (all reactivated from reserve for Falklands War)

Ardent and Antelope lost due to enemy action.

== Amphibious Units ==
- Fearless-class – Fearless & Intrepid.
- Round Table-class Royal Fleet Auxiliary: Sir Bedivere, Sir Galahad, Sir Geraint, Sir Lancelot, Sir Percivale & Sir Tristram.
- Logistic Landing Craft (RCT) – HMAV Ardennes & HMAV Arakan.
- LCM (9) Type – 14 craft
- LCM (7) Type – 2 craft
- Avon-class RPL – Avon, Bude, Clyde, Dart, Eden, Forth, Glen, Hamble, Itchen, Kennet, London & Medway.
- LCVP -
  - LCVP 1: 9 craft
  - LCVP 2: 8 craft
  - LCVP 3: 9 craft
- LCP(R) – 3 craft

Sir Galahad lost due to enemy action, Sir Tristram heavily damaged (returned to the U.K. on a heavy-lift vessel).

== Mine Warfare Forces ==
- Abdiel. (Note: Exercise Minelayer.)
- Hunt-class – Brecon, Ledbury, Cattistock, Cottesmore, Brocklesby, Middleton, Chiddingfold, Dulverton & Hurworth.
- Wilton. (Note: prototype Coastal Minesweeper/hunter.)
- Ton-class -
  - Mine Hunters: Bilderston, Brereton, Brinton, Bronington, Bossington, Gavinton, Hubberston, Iverston, Kedleston, Kellington, Kirkliston, Maxton, Nurton & Sheraton.
  - Minesweepers: Alfringston, Bickington, Crichton, Cuxton, Glasserton, Hodgeston, Laleston, Pollington, Shavington, Upton, Walkerton, Wotton, Soberton, Stubbington, Lewiston & Crofton.
- Venturer-class – St. David & Venturer.
- Ley-class – Aveley.
- Ham-class – Dittisham, Flintham & Thornham.

== Ice Patrol Ship ==
- Endurance

== Offshore Patrol Vessels ==
- Castle-class - Leeds Castle, Dumbarton Castle
- Island-class - Anglesey, Alderney, Jersey, Guernsey, Shetland, Orkney, Lindisfarne

== Submarine Service ==
- Resolution-class - Resolution, Renown, Repulse, Revenge
- Trafalgar-class - Five fitting out/in build as of December 1982
- Swiftsure-class - Swiftsure, Sovereign, Superb, Sceptre, Spartan, Splendid
- Valiant-class - Valiant, Warspite
- Churchill-class - Churchill, Conqueror, Courageous
- Oberon-class - Oberon, Ocelot, Odin, Olympus, Onslaught, Onyx, Opportune, Oppossum, Oracle, Orpheus, Osiris, Otter, Otis,
- Porpoise-class - Porpoise, Finwhale (harbour training vessel), Sealion, Walrus

== See also ==
- List of Royal Navy vessels active in 1981

== Notes ==
† - Royal Navy Reserve
