= List of ship launches in 2012 =

The list of ship launches in 2012 includes a chronological list of ships launched in 2012.

Date	Ship	Class / type	Builder	Location	Country	Notes
7 January	MSC Deila	MSC Danit-type container ship	Daewoo Shipbuilding & Marine Engineering	Geoje	South Korea	
8 January	Disney Fantasy	Cruise ship	Meyer Werft	Papenburg	Germany	For Disney Cruise Line
12 January	Seatruck Performance	Ro-ro ferry	Flensburger Schiffbau-Gesellschaft	Flensburg	Germany	For Seatruck Ferries
13 January	Paul Clark	Sentinel-class cutter	Bollinger Shipyards	Lockport, Louisiana	United States	For United States Coast Guard
14 January	Coronado	Independence-class littoral combat ship	Austal USA	Mobile, Alabama	United States	For United States Navy
27 January	Suzuran	Ro-ro ferry	Mitsubishi Heavy Industries	Nagasaki	Japan	For Shin Nihonkai
27 January	Suisen	Ro-ro ferry	Mitsubishi Heavy Industries	Nagasaki	Japan	For Shin Nihonkai
4 February	Santa Barbarra	Santa-class container ship	Daewoo Shipbuilding & Marine Engineering	Okpo	South Korea	For Hamburg Süd
7 February	Notorious	Replica caravel	Graeme Wylie	Bushfield	Australia	
15 February	Vale Carajas	Valemax	Daewoo Shipbuilding & Marine Engineering	Geoje-Okpo	South Korea	For Vale Shipping
1 March	Meri	Cargo ship	STX Finland	Turku	Finland	For Gaiamare
2 March	Robert Yered	Sentinel-class cutter	Bollinger Shipyards	Lockport, Louisiana	United States	For United States Coast Guard
2 March	UAL Bodewes		Bodewes shipyard	Hoogezand	Netherlands	
3 March	MSC Valeria	MSC Danit-type container ship	Daewoo Shipbuilding & Marine Engineering	Geoje	South Korea	
10 March	Lady Alexandra	Sea-River Liner 3700 coastal ship	GS Yard	Waterhuizen	Netherlands	For Wijnne Barends
13 March	Harro Koebke	36,5-meter-class Lifeboat	Fassmer	Bern	Germany	For DGzRS
14 March	CSCL Neptune	CSCL Star-class container ship	Samsung Heavy Industries	Geoje	South Korea	For China Shipping Container Lines
17 March	Vikingbank		Ferus Smit	Westerbroek	Netherlands	For Wagenborg Shipping
23 March	Seatruck Precision	Ro-ro ferry	Flensburger Schiffbau-Gesellschaft	Flensburg	Germany	For Seatruck Ferries
31 March	Carlo Margottini	FREMM multipurpose frigate	Fincantieri	Riva Trigoso	Italy	For Italian Navy
1 April	AIDAmar	Sphinx-class cruise ship	Meyer Werft	Papenburg	Germany	For AIDA Cruises
3 April	Mirabilis	Research vessel	STX Finland	Rauma	Finland	For Ministry of Fisheries and Marine Resources of Namibia
6 April	Discovery	Royal Research Ship	Freire Shipyard	Vigo	Spain	For Natural Environment Research Council
6 April	Hamburg Express	Hamburg Express-class container ship	Hyundai Heavy Industries	Ulsan	South Korea	For Hapag Lloyd
7 April	Vale Minas Gerais	Valemax	Daewoo Shipbuilding & Marine Engineering	Geoje-Okpo	South Korea	For Vale Shipping
11 April	Fuldaborg		Ferus Smit	Leer	Germany	For Wagenborg
12 April	Stavangerfjord	Cruise ferry	Stocznia Gdańsk	Gdańsk	Poland	For Fjord Line
14 April	Somerset	San Antonio-class amphibious transport dock	Avondale Shipyard	New Orleans	United States	For United States Navy
15 April	Vale Espirito Santo	Valemax	STX Offshore & Shipbuilding	Dalian	China	For Vale Shipping
22 April	Santa Ines	Santa-class container ship	Daewoo Shipbuilding & Marine Engineering	Geoje-Okpo	South Korea	For Hamburg Süd
29 April	Vale Shandong	Valemax	Jiangsu Rongsheng Heavy Industries		China	For Vale Shipping
3 May	Georg Burmester	Sunrise-class	GS Yard	Waterhuizen	Netherlands	
5 May	Cesar Chavez	Lewis and Clark-class dry cargo ship	National Steel and Shipbuilding Company	San Diego	United States	For United States Navy
18 May	Ivan Gren	Ivan Gren-class landing ship	Yantar Shipyard	Kaliningrad	Russia	For Russian Navy
31 May	Lady Amalia	Sea-River Liner 3700 coastal ship	GS Yard	Waterhuizen	Netherlands	For Wijnne Barends
4 June	America	America-class amphibious assault ship	Huntington Ingalls Industries	Pascagoula, Mississippi	United States	For United States Navy
5 June	Draken Harald Hårfagre	Viking longship	Viking Kings AS	Haugesund	Norway	
7 June	Andoni	Andoni-class seaward defence boat			Nigeria	For Nigerian Navy
16 June	Reuben Lasker		Marinette Marine	Marinette	United States	For NOAA
30 June	Vitus Bering	Platform supply vessel	Arctech Helsinki Shipyard	Helsinki	Finland	For Sovcomflot
1 July	Vale Indonesia	Valemax	STX Offshore & Shipbuilding	Dalian	China	For Vale Shipping
6 July	Hermione	Concorde-class frigate		Rochefort	France	Reproduction of the 1779 French frigate Hermione
6 July	Europa 2	Cruise ship	STX Europe	Saint-Nazaire	France	For Hapag-Lloyd
13 July	Vale Fujiyama	Valemax	STX Offshore & Shipbuilding	Jinhae-gu, Changwon	South Korea	For Vale Shipping
13 July	New York Express	Hamburg Express-class container ship	Hyundai Heavy Industries	Ulsan	South Korea	For Hapag Lloyd
26 July	Vale Jiangsu	Valemax	Jiangsu Rongsheng Heavy Industries		China	For Vale Shipping
28 July	Haixun 01	Patrol ship			China	For China Maritime Safety Administration
3 August	Kindral Kurvits	Patrol boat	Uudenkaupungin Työvene Oy	Uusikaupunki	Finland	For Estonian Border Guard
10 August	Viking Grace	Cruiseferry	STX Finland	Turku	Finland	For Viking Line
12 August	Celebrity Reflection	Cruise ship	Meyer Werft	Papenburg	Germany	For Celebrity Cruises
16 August	Royal Princess	Royal-class cruise ship	Fincantieri	Monfalcone	Italy	For Princess Cruises
26 August	Durjoy	Durjoy-class patrol craft	Wuchang Shipyard	Wuhan	China	For Bangladesh Navy
29 August	Nordergründe	Buoy tender	Fassmer		Germany	
31 August	Piz Bever	Sunrise class	GS Yard	Waterhuizen	Netherlands	
1 September	Basle Express	Hamburg Express-class container ship	Hyundai Heavy Industries	Ulsan	South Korea	For Hapag Lloyd
12 September	Sahand	Moudge-class frigate	Iranian Navy's Factories	Bandar Abbas	Iran	For Islamic Republic of Iran Navy
19 September	NYK Helios	OOCL M-class container ship	Samsung Heavy Industries	Geoje	South Korea	For Orient Overseas Container Line
27 September	Vale Tubarao	Valemax	STX Offshore & Shipbuilding	Dalian	China	For Vale Shipping
27 September	Nirmul	Durjoy-class patrol craft	Wuchang Shipyard	Wuhan	China	For Bangladesh Navy
1 October	Choctaw County	Spearhead-class expeditionary fast transport	Austal USA	Mobile, Alabama	United States	For Military Sealift Command
7 October	Dockwise Vanguard	Heavy lift ship	Hyundai Heavy Industries			For Dockwise
8 October	Padma	Padma-class patrol vessel	Khulna Shipyard	Khulna	Bangladesh	For Bangladesh Navy
13 October	Sikuliaq	Research vessel	Marinette Marine Corporation	Marinette, Wisconsin	United States	For National Science Foundation
18 October	Normandie	FREMM multipurpose frigate	DCNS	Lorient	France	For French Navy
27 October	Karel Doorman	Amphibious support ship	Galați shipyard	Galați	Romania	For Royal Netherlands Navy
3 November	Minnesota	Virginia-class submarine	Newport News Shipbuilding		United States	For United States Navy
3 November	OOCL Brussels	OOCL M-class container ship	Samsung Heavy Industries	Geoje	South Korea	For Orient Overseas Container Line
13 November	Montford Point	Montford Point-class expeditionary transfer dock	National Steel and Shipbuilding Company	San Diego	United States	For United States Navy
23 November	Aleksey Chirikov	Platform supply vessel	Arctech Helsinki Shipyard	Helsinki	Finland	For Sovcomflot
2 December	Vava II	Motor yacht	Babcock Marine Ltd.	Appledore	United Kingdom	For private owner.
3 December	Yantar	Intelligence and research ship	Yantar Shipyard	Kaliningrad	Russia	For Russian Navy
5 December	Menominee	Valiant-class harbor tug	J.M. Martinac Shipbuilding Corp.	Tacoma, Washington	United States	For United States Navy
10 December	OOCL Berlin	OOCL M-class container ship	Samsung Heavy Industries	Geoje	South Korea	For Orient Overseas Container Line
17 December	Hallaig	Ferry	Ferguson Shipbuilders	Port Glasgow	United Kingdom	For Caledonian MacBrayne
10 December	Ramform Titan	Ramform Titan-class research vessel	Mitsubishi Heavy Ind., Ltd.	Nagasaki	Japan	
19 December	Luigi Dattilo	Dattilo-class offshore patrol vessel	Fincantieri	Castellammare di Stabia	Italy	For Italy Coast Guard
21 December	Hong Kong Express	Hamburg Express-class container ship	Hyundai Heavy Industries	Ulsan	South Korea	For Hapag Lloyd
30 December	Vladimir Monomakh	Borei-class submarine	Sevmash	Severodvinsk	Russia	For Russian Navy
Unknown date	Channel Chieftain VI	Crew transfer vessel	Aluminium Boatbuilding Co. Ltd.	Hayling Island	United Kingdom	For Carlin Boat Charter Ltd.
Unknown date	Dalby Tees	Crew transfer vessel	Alicat Workboats Ltd.	Great Yarmouth	United Kingdom	For Dalby Offshore Services Ltd.
Unknown date	Gardian11	Crew transfer vessel	Alicat Workboats Ltd.	Great Yarmouth	United Kingdom	For Gardline Environmental Ltd.
Unknown date	Rix Panther	Wind farm service vessel	Alnmaritec Ltd.	Blyth	United Kingdom	For Rix Sea Shuttle Ltd.
Unknown date	Smeaton Array	Crew transfer vessel	Alicat Workboats Ltd.	Great Yarmouth	United Kingdom	For For Gardline Environmental Ltd.
