= BNS Durjoy =

Two ships of the Bangladesh Navy carried the name BNS Durjoy:

- BNS Durjoy (1982), a Type 037-class submarine chaser damaged in 1995.
- BNS Durjoy (2012), a Durjoy-class large patrol craft currently in service.
