= List of Royal Navy ships =

There are two lists of Royal Navy ships:

- List of active Royal Navy ships lists all currently commissioned vessels in the Royal Navy.
- List of ship names of the Royal Navy lists all names that Royal Navy ships have ever borne.

== See also ==
- Bibliography of 18th–19th century Royal Naval history
- List of Royal Navy vessels active in 1981
- List of Royal Navy vessels active in 1982
