= BNS Bijoy =

Castle-class patrol vessel

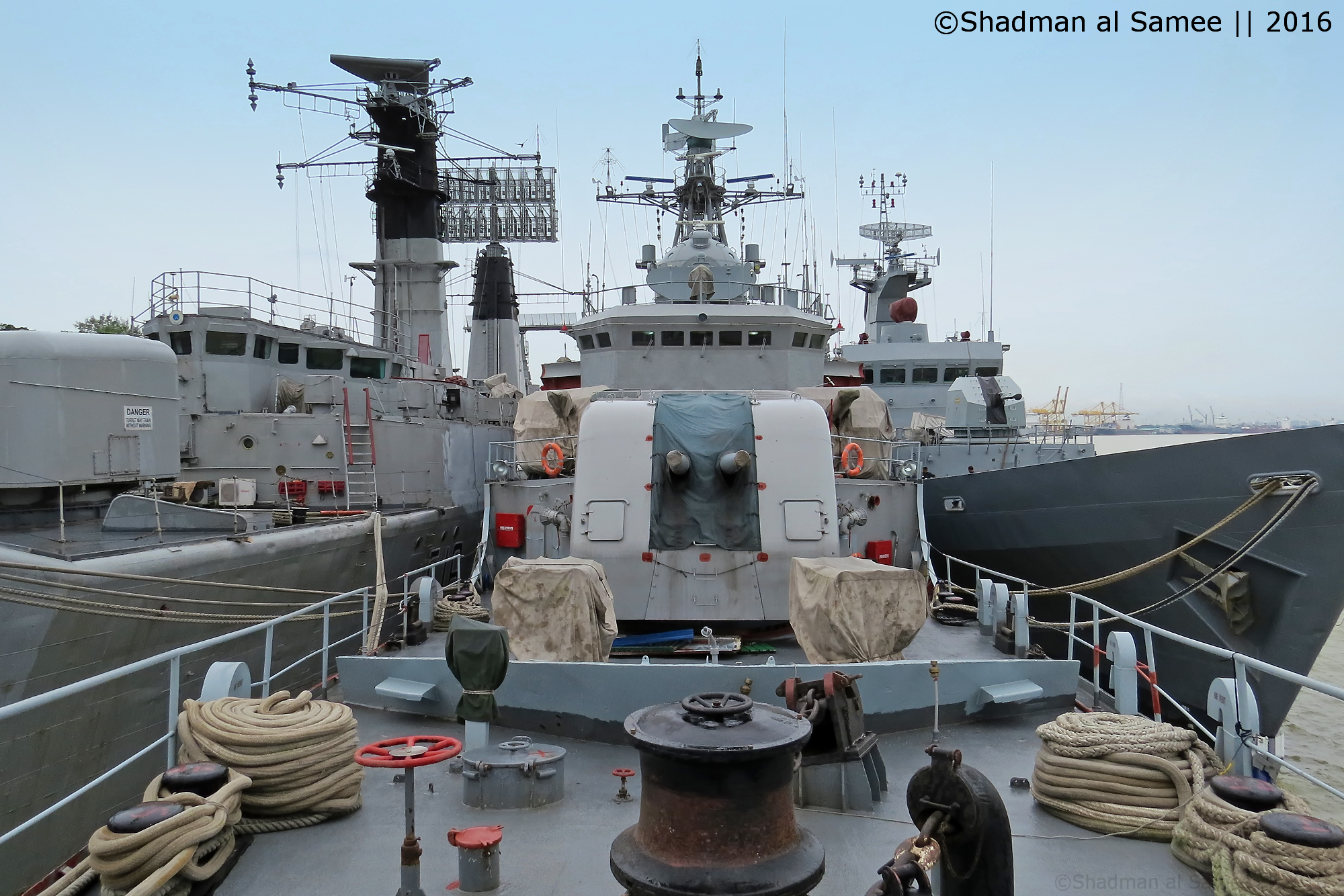
- Bridge and main gun of BNS Bijoy (right)

History

Bangladesh
- Name: BNS Bijoy
- Builder: Hall, Russell & Company, Aberdeen
- Launched: 3 June 1981
- Acquired: 14 May 2010
- Commissioned: 5 March 2011
- Home port: Mongla
- Identification: Pennant number: F 35; IMO number: 7920015
- Status: In active service

General characteristics
- Class & type: Castle-class corvette
- Displacement: 1,430 tonnes
- Length: 81 m (265 ft 9 in)
- Beam: 11.5 m (37 ft 9 in)
- Draught: 3.6 m (11 ft 10 in)
- Propulsion: 2 × Ruston 12RKC 5,640 bhp (4,210 kW) diesels, 2 shafts
- Speed: 18 knots (33 km/h; 21 mph) max; 12 knots (22 km/h; 14 mph) cruise
- Range: 10,000 nmi (19,000 km; 12,000 mi) at 10 knots (19 km/h; 12 mph)
- Complement: 45 + accommodation for 25 SWADS
- Sensors & processing systems: Type 360 Radar Surface Search, E/F band; Type 348 fire control radar for main gun; Kelvin Hughes SharpEye surveillance radar, S band; Kelvin Hughes SharpEye navigation radar, X band
- Armament: 1 x H/PJ-26 76 mm (3.0 in) main gun; 4 × C-704 AShM; 2 × Oerlikon 20 mm (0.79 in) auto cannons
- Aviation facilities: Flight deck

BNS Bijoy is a Castle-class guided missile corvette of the Bangladesh Navy. She has been serving in the Bangladesh Navy since 2011.

== Description ==
Bijoy carries four C-704 automated anti-ship missiles as well as one H/PJ-26 76 mm main gun and two Oerlikon 20 mm auto cannons. She has a flight deck which can accommodate a helicopter up to Westland Sea King size.

== History ==
The ship was laid down by Hall, Russell & Company of Aberdeen, Scotland, on 25 June 1980 and launched on 3 June 1981. She was commissioned into the Royal Navy as HMS Dumbarton Castle on 12 March 1982. She served the Royal Navy from 1982 to 2008. The ship was decommissioned in 2008 and, in April 2010, sold to the Bangladesh Navy.

=== Bangladesh ===
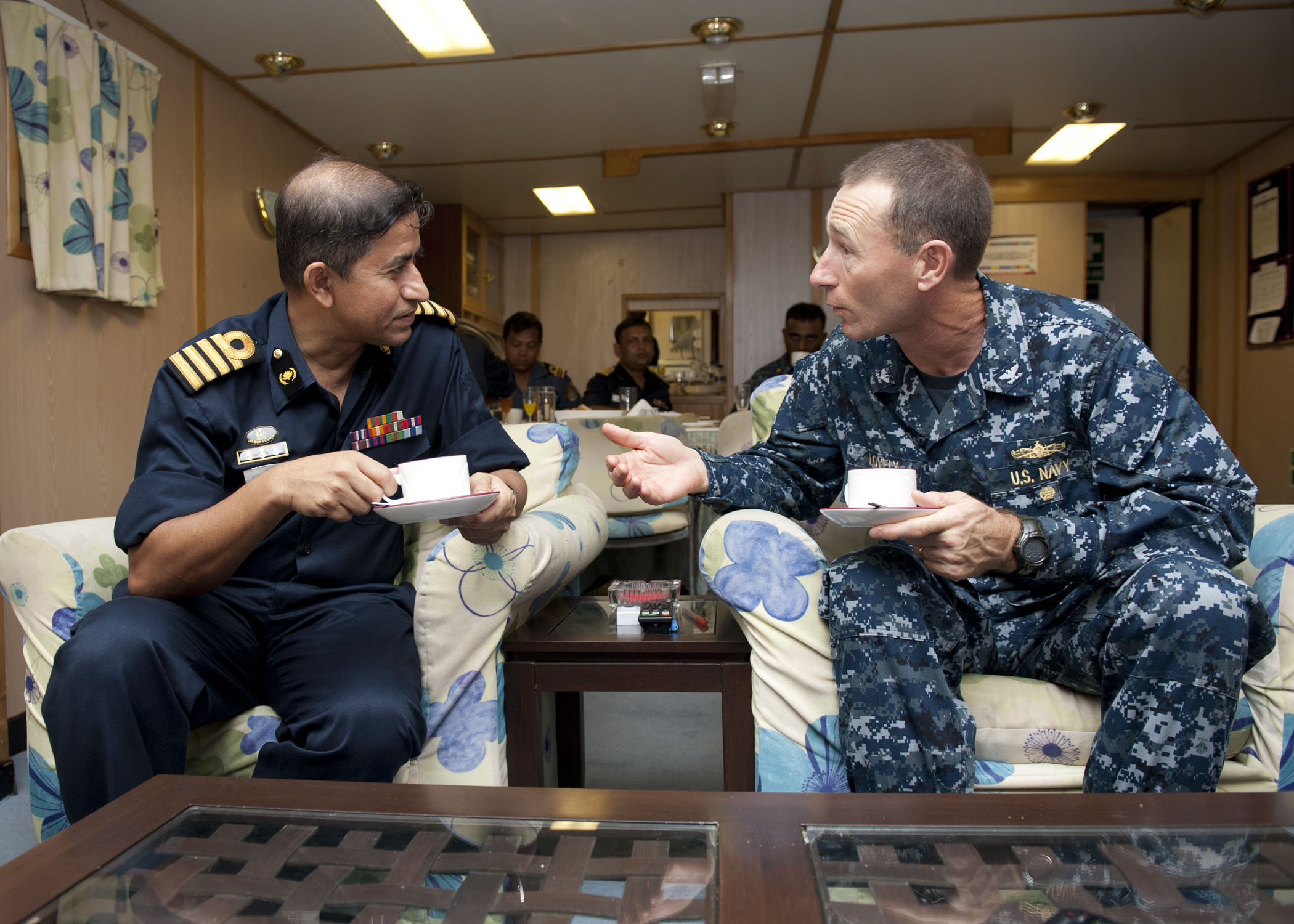
The wardroom of BNS Bijoy

From 21 May 2010, the ship underwent a major refit, installing upgrades to suit the Bangladesh Navy's requirements, which continued until December 2010. The Bangladesh Navy formally acquired the ship on 14 May 2010. Bijoy reached Chittagong on 21 January 2011. On 5 March 2011, the ship was commissioned into the Bangladesh Navy as BNS Bijoy.

She took part in Cooperation Afloat Readiness and Training (CARAT), a bilateral exercise with the United States Navy, in 2011 and 2015.

On 1 December 2017, BNS Bijoy departed for Lebanon to join the Maritime Task Force of the United Nations Interim Force in Lebanon (UNIFIL). She replaced two Bangladesh Navy ships, BNS Ali Haider and BNS Nirmul on 1 January 2018, which had deployed earlier. En route, she paid a goodwill visit to the Port of Colombo from 6 to 8 December.

On 4 August 2020, BNS Bijoy was berthed in the Port of Beirut during a massive onshore explosion. The ship received moderate damage and 21 crew members were injured in the blast. The crew of Bijoy received medical assistance and help with damage assessment from the Brazilian frigate Independência, the flagship of the UNIFIL fleet. After assessment Bijoy was towed by the ocean tug TCG İnebolu to Turkey, where she was repaired in the naval shipyard at Aksaz Naval Base. After completing the repair works, the ship returned home on 25 October 2020. Another corvette, BNS Sangram, replaced her in the UNIFIL mission.

== See also ==
- List of active ships of the Bangladesh Navy
- BNS Dhaleshwari
- HMS Leeds Castle
