= BNS Durgam =

Ship of Bangladesh Navy

History

Bangladesh
- Name: BNS Durgam
- Ordered: 30 June 2014
- Builder: Khulna Shipyard
- Laid down: 6 September 2015
- Launched: 29 December 2016
- Commissioned: 8 November 2017
- Identification: Pennant number: P 814; MMSI number: 405000218; Callsign: S3VD
- Status: In active service

General characteristics
- Class & type: Durjoy-class patrol craft
- Displacement: 648 tonnes
- Length: 64.2 m (211 ft) (oa)
- Beam: 9 m (30 ft)
- Draught: 5.25 m (17.2 ft)
- Propulsion: 2 x SEMT Pielstick 12PA6 diesel engines; 2 x shafts
- Speed: 25 knots (46 km/h)
- Range: 2,000 nmi (3,700 km; 2,300 mi)
- Endurance: 15 days
- Complement: 70
- Sensors & processing systems: SR47AG surface and air search radar; TR47C Fire Control Radar for main gun; JMA 3336 navigational radar, X-band; Vision Master chart radar; ESS-2B bow mounted sonar
- Armament: 1 × NG 16-1 76.2 mm naval gun; 1 × CS/AN2 30 mm naval gun; 2 × triple torpedo tubes for ET-52C torpedoes

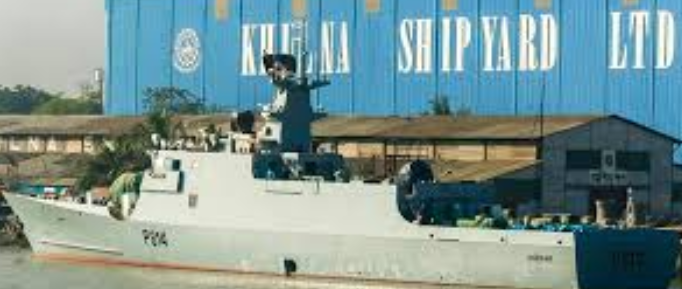
BNS Durgam

BNS Durgam is a Durjoy-class semi-stealth large patrol craft (LPC) of the Bangladesh Navy. She has been serving in the Bangladesh Navy since 2017.

== Career ==
The ship was launched on 26 December 2016. The President of Bangladesh, Abdul Hamid, commissioned the ship into the Bangladesh Navy on 8 November 2017.

== Design ==
BNS Durgam is 64.2 metres (210.6 ft) long overall, with a beam of 9 metres (29.5 ft) and has a 5.25 metres (17.2 ft) draught with a displacement of 648 tonnes. The ship has a bulbous bow that suggests it is very stable in heavy seas. It has the speed and range to support long lasting missions. The LPC is powered by two SEMT Pielstick 12PA6 diesel engines driving three screws for a top speed of 25 knots (46 km/h; 29 mph). The range of the ship is 2,000 nautical miles (3,700 km; 2,300 mi) and endurance is 15 days. It has a complement of 70 officers and enlisted. The ship was mainly purpose-built as an anti-submarine warfare platform.

=== Electronics ===
The primary sensor of the ship is a SR47AG surface and air search radar. The ship carries a Chinese TR47C fire control radar for main gun. For navigation, the ship uses the Japanese JMA 3336 radar. To help the navigational radar, the Vision Master chart radar is used. The ship has an ESS-2B bow mounted sonar with an effective range of about 8,000 metres (8,700 yd) for underwater detection.

=== Armament ===
The ASW LPC uses a Chinese origin single 76.2 mm (3 in) NG 16-1 naval gun as the primary gun. The vessel is also equipped with one CS/AN2 30 mm (1.2 in) single-barrel naval gun mounted amidships used as the secondary gun. She is armed with two triple 324 mm (13 in) torpedo tubes for ET-52C torpedo.

== See also ==
- List of active ships of the Bangladesh Navy
