= Bibliography of 18th–19th-century Royal Naval history =

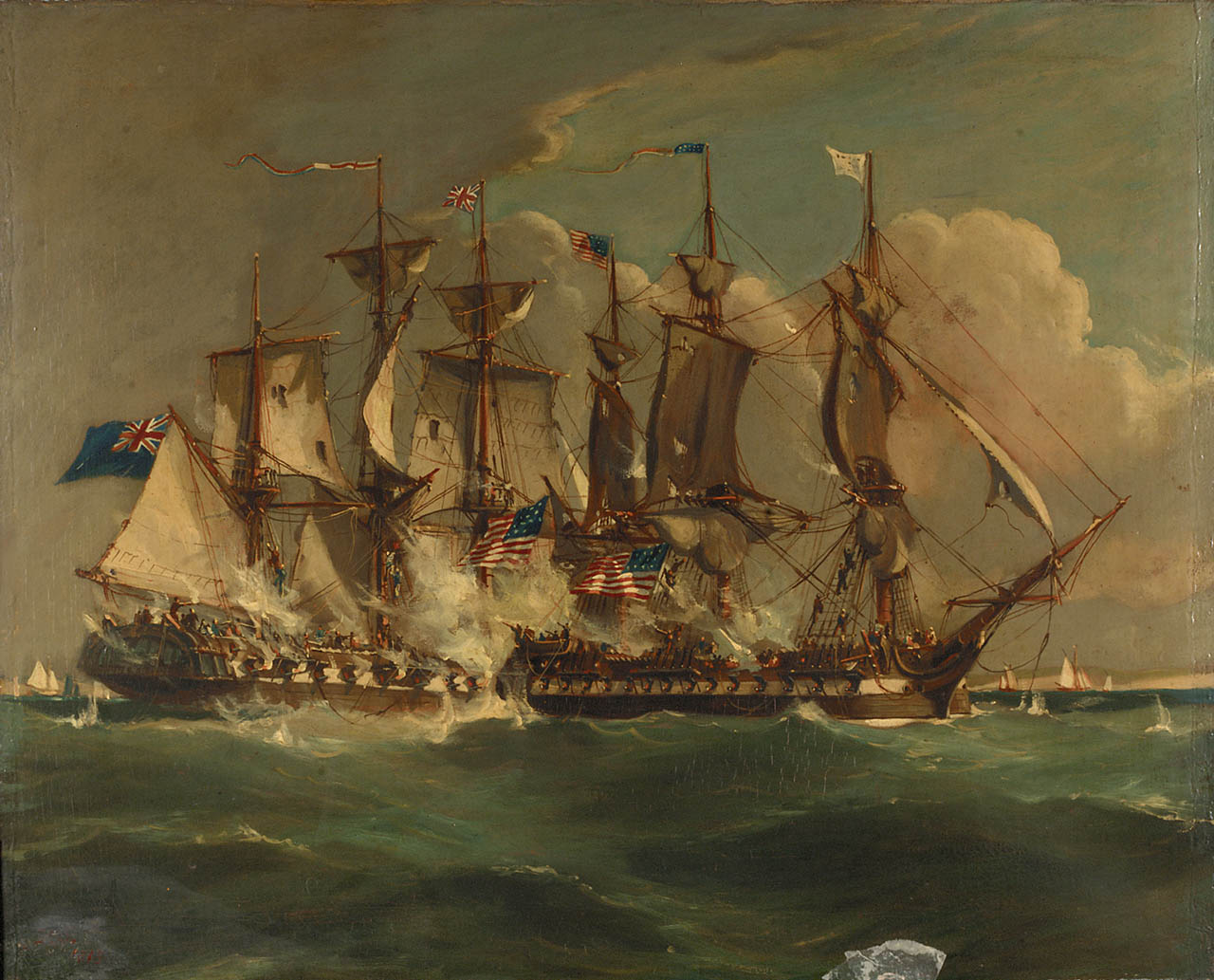
A 19th-century depiction of the capture of USS Chesapeake, a single-ship action of the War of 1812

This bibliography covers sources for Royal Navy history through the 18th and 19th centuries. Some sources may be duplicated in sections when appropriate. Among the contemporary and earlier historical accounts are primary sources, historical accounts, often derived from letters, dispatches, government and military records, captain's logs and diaries, etc., by people involved in or closely associated to the historical episode in question. Primary source material is either written by these people or often collected, compiled, and/or written and published by other editors also, sometimes many years after the historical subject has passed. Primary sources listed in this bibliography are denoted with an uppercase bold ' (P) before the book title. Publications that are in the public domain and available online for viewing in their entirety are denoted with E'Book.

== Royal Navy ==
- Adams, James Truslow (1940). EMPIRE ON THE SEVEN SEAS THE BRITISH EMPIRE, Charles Schriber & Sons, New York, 409 pages; E'book
- Adkins, Roy; Adkins, Lesley (2008). The War for All the Oceans:From Nelson at the Nile to Napoleon at Waterloo
  Penguin Books, 560 pages, ISBN 9781440638626, Book (par view)
- Albion, Robert Greenhalgh, (1926), Forests and Sea Power: The Timber Problem of the Royal Navy, 1652–1862, Volume 29,
  Harvard University Press, 485 pages, Book (snippit view)
- Allen, Joseph (1853). Battles of the British navy, Volume 1
  Henry G. Bohn, London, 532 pages, E'book
- Archibald, Edward H. H. (1968), The wooden fighting ship in the Royal Navy, A.D. 897–1860,
  Blandford P., 174 pages, Book (snippit view)
- Barnes, Ian Barnes (2000). The Historical Atlas of the American RevolutionPsychology Press, 208 pages, Book (par view)
- Brassey, Thomas B. (1882). The British navy: its strength, resources, and administration, Volume 1.
  Longmans, Green, and co., 624 pages. E'book
- Beatty, William (1807). The Death of Lord Nelson.
  Davison, White, Londonm 99 pages. E'book
- Brenton, Edward Pelham (1824). The naval history of Great Britain: from the year MDCCLXXXIII to MDCCCXXII.
  C. Rice, J.F.Dove, London, 536 pages. E'book
- Foreign and Commonwealth Office, Great Britain, ed. (1857). British and foreign state papers, Volume 28.
  Harrison and Sons, 408 pages, London. E'book
- Clowes, Sir William Laird; Markham, Sir Clements Robert; Mahan, Alfred Thayer; Wilson, Herbert Wrigley; Roosevelt, Theodore; Laughton, Leonard George Carr (1901). The Royal Navy: a history from the earliest times to the present, Volume 6.
  Sampson Low, Marston and Co., London, limited. p. 592. E'book
- Coleman, Terry (2004). The Nelson Touch: The life and legend.
  Oxford University Press. p. 472. ISBN 0-19-517322-8. Book (par view)
- Colomb, Philip Howard (1905). The battle of Trafalgar
  W. Clowes & sons, limited, p. 18, E'book
- Corbett, Sir Julian Stafford. The campaign of Trafalgar, Volume 2.
  Longmans, Green, and co., 1919. p. 538. E'book
- Fraser, Edward (1906). The enemy at Trafalgar: an account of the battle from eye-witnesses' narratives and letters and despatches from the French and Spanish fleets
  E.P.Dutton & Co., New York, p. 436, E'book
  - Gardiner, Robert; Randal, Gray; Przemyslaw, Budzbon (1985).
    Conway's All the World's Fighting Ships 1906–1921, Conway's Naval History after 1850 Series.
    Naval Institute Press, Annapolis, Maryland. ISBN 0-85177-245-5.
  - —— (1979). Conway's All the World's Fighting Ships 1860–1905.
    Naval Institute Press, Annapolis, Maryland. ISBN 0-87021-912-X.
  - ——; Lambert, Andrew (2001). Steam, Steel and Shellfire: The Steam Warship 1815–1905-Conway's History of the Ship.
    Book Sales, Edison, New Jersey. ISBN 978-0-7858-1413-9.
- Goodwin, Peter G. (1987). The Construction and Fitting of the English Man of War: 1650–1850,
  Naval Institute Press, p. 276, ISBN 9780870210167, Book (par view)
- Fremont-Barnes, Gregory. (2007) The Royal Navy 1793–1815 (Battle Orders)
  Osprey Publishing, p. 96, ISBN 9781846031380 excerpt and text search
- Harrison, Cy (2019) Royal Navy Officers of the Seven Years War: A Biographical Dictionary of Commissioned Officers 1748-1763
  Helion and Company, p. 584 Publishers Website
- Hill, J.R. (2002). The Oxford Illustrated History of the Royal Navy
  Oxford University Press, p. 496, Book (par view)
- James, William Milbourne (1926). The British Navy in Adversity: A Study of the War of American Independence,

Longmans, Green and Co., Ltd, London, p. 459, Url

- —— (1948). The influence of sea power on the history of the British people
  University Press, p. 71, Url
- James, William The naval history of Great Britain. There are two major edition the first was a five volume (London Baldwin, Cradock & Joy, 1822–1824). Listed here is the "new edition" in six volume with preface first published in London, April 1859 are available online for viewing at the Internet Archive and as they were published in 1902 are in the public domain (copyright expired):
  - James, William (1902). The naval history of Great Britain (1448–1796). Vol. 1 (New six volume ed.). London: Macmillan.
  - The naval history of Great Britain (1797–1800). Vol. 2 (New six volume ed.). London: Macmillan. 1902.
  - The naval history of Great Britain (1800–1805). Vol. 3 (New six volume ed.). London: Macmillan. 1902.
  - The naval history of Great Britain (1805–1809). Vol. 4 (New six volume ed.). London: Macmillan. 1902.
  - The naval history of Great Britain (1809–1813). Vol. 5 (New six volume ed.). London: Macmillan. 1902.
  - The naval history of Great Britain (1813–1827). Vol. 6 (New six volume ed.). London: Macmillan. 1902.
- Knight, Roger (2005) The Pursuit of Victory: The Life and Achievement of Horatio Nelson
  Basic Books, New York, p. 874 ISBN 046503764X, Url
- Lavery, Brian (1984), The Ship of the Line: The development of the battlefleet 1650–1850,
  Conway Maritime Press, p. 224, ISBN 9780851772523, E'Book
- —— (1987). Arming and Fitting of English Ships of War, 1600–1815,
  Naval Institute Press, p. 319, ISBN 9780870210099, Url
- —— (1991). Building the Wooden Walls: The Design and Construction of the 74-Gun Ship Valiant,
  Naval Institute Press, p. 206, ISBN 9781557500786, Url
- Lincoln, Margarette Lincoln (2002). Representing the Royal Navy: British Sea Power, 1750–1815
  Ashgate Publishing, Ltd, p. 226, ISBN 9780754608301 Url
- Marshall, John (1823–1835). "Index" . Royal Naval Biography.
  London: Longman and Company. (Note: Full title: Royal naval biography; or, Memoirs of the services of all the flag-officers, superannuated rear-admirals, retired-captains, post-captains, and commanders, whose names appeared on the Admiralty list of sea officers at the commencement of the present year or who have since been promoted)
- Mitchell, W. F.; Elgar, Francis (1881). The Royal navy: in a series of illustrations.
  Griffin & Co, London. E'Book
- O'Byrne, William R. (1849). "Index" . A Naval Biographical Dictionary.
  London: John Murray. (Note: Full title: A Naval Biographical Dictionary: Comprising the Life and Services of Every Living Officer in Her Majesty's Navy, From the Rank of Admiral of the Fleet to that of Lieutenant, Inclusive.)
- Mould, Daphne. [1983] "What it was Like to be shot up by Old Ironsides" [American Heritage Magazine] (Log pages of HMS Cyane February 1815) (Note: The April/May 1983 issue of American Heritage magazine carried an article "What it was like to be Shot up by Old Ironsides" concerning the discovery of three pages of HMS Cyane's logbook from 13–20 February 1815, with a transcription of 20 February 1815 battle log of Alfred L. Strangeways.)
- O'Byrne, Robert, ed. (1888). James' Naval History.
  London: W. H. Allen & Company. (Note: Full title: James' Naval History: A Narrative of the Naval Battles, Single Ship Actions, Notable Sieges and Dashing Cutting-out Expeditions Fought in the Days of Howe, Hood, Duncan, St. Vincent, Bridport, Nelson, Camperdown, Exmouth, Duckworth and Sir Sydney) E'Book
- Protheroe, Ernest (2010). The British Navy: Its Making and Its Meaning
  BiblioBazaar, p. 736, ISBN 9781176425996, Url
- Rasor, Eugene L. (2004). English/British Naval History to 1815: A Guide to the Literature.
  Greenwood Publishing Group, CT. p. 875. ISBN 0313305471. Url
- Richmond, Herbert (1913). Papers Relating to the Loss of Minorca in 1756
  Navy Records Society
- —— (1920). The Navy in the War of 1739-48
  Cambridge University Press, E'Book
- —— (1931). The Navy in India, 1763-1783
- Rodger, Nicholas A.M. (2006). The Command of the Ocean: A Naval History of Britain, 1649–1815.
  Penguin Books Limited. ISBN 0141026901. Url
- —— (1989). The wooden world: an anatomy of the Georgian navy
  William Collins Sons & Co., London. p. 445 ISBN 9780002165488, Url
- Scott, Sir Percy (1919). Fifty years in the Royal Navy.
  George H. Doran company. p. 358. E'Book
- Southey, Robert (1813). The Life of Nelson. p. 302. E'Book
- Stevens, William Oliver; Westcott, Allan Ferguson (1920), A History of Sea Power,
  George H. Doran Company, p. 428, E'Book
- Stout, Neil R. (1962). The Royal Navy in American Waters, 1760–1775, Volume 2
  University of Wisconsin—Madison, p. 888, Url
- —— (1973). The Royal Navy in America, 1760–1775: A Study of Enforcement of British Colonial Policy in the Era of the American Revolution
  Naval Institute Press, Annapolis. p. 227, Url
- Stenzel, Alfred (1898) The British Navy
  T. Fisher Unwin, London, p. 327, E'Book
- Swinburne, Henry Lawrence (1907). The Royal Navy.
  A. and C. Black, London. p. 378. E'Book
- Vincent, Edgar (2003). Nelson: Love & Fame (Biography & Autobiography)
  Yale University Press, p. 640, ISBN 0-300-10260-7, Url
- Williamson, James Alexander (1916). The Foundation and Growth of the British Empir.
  Macmillan, London. p. 290. E'Book
- Winfield, Rif (2010):
  - (i) British Warships in the Age of Sail 1603 – 1714: Design Construction, Careers and Fates, p. 314, ISBN 9781848320406, Url
  - (ii) British Warships in the Age of Sail 1714-1792: Design, Construction, Careers and Fates (2007) ISBN 978-1-84415-700-6.
  - (iii) British Warships in the Age of Sail 1793-1817: Design, Construction, Careers and Fates (2005. Second edition in 2008) ISBN 978-1-84415-717-4.
  - (iv) British Warships in the Age of Sail 1817-1863: Design, Construction, Careers and Fates. (2014) ISBN 978-1-84832-169-4.
- Worrall, Simon (2005). "Battle of Trafalgar: Admiral Lord Nelson's Fatal Victory". National Geographic. 208 (4).
- Yonge, Charles Duke (1863). The history of the British Navy: from the earliest period to the present time:in two volumes, Volume 2
  Richard Bentley, 1863, p. 809, E'Book

=== Admiral Nelson ===
- Adkin, Mark (2007). The Trafalgar Companion: A Guide to History's Most Famous Sea Battle and the Life of Admiral Lord Nelson
  Aurum Press, London; p. 560, ISBN 9781845130183, Url
- Bennett, Geoffrey Martin (1972). Nelson, the commander
  Scribner, p. 322, Url
- Bradford, Ernle (2012), Nelson: The Essential Hero,
  E-reads/E-rights, p. 436, ISBN 9781617568169, Url
- Clarke, James Stanier; McArthur, John (1810). The life of Admiral Lord Nelson.
  Bensley, London for Cadell. p. 702. E'Book Url2
- Davies, David Tudor (1996). Nelson's navy: English fighting ships, 1793–1815
  Stackpole Books, Penn., p. 201, ISBN 9780811711180, Url
- Goodwin, Peter (2002). Nelson's Ships: A History Of The Vessels In Which He Served: 1771 – 1805
  Conway Maritime Press, London; p. 312, ISBN 0-8117-1007-6, Url
- Howarth, David ; Howarth, Stephen; (2004). Nelson: The Immortal Memory, p. 408, ISBN 9780851779935, Url
- Knight, Roger (2007). The Pursuit of Victory: The Life and Achievement of Horatio Nelson
  Basic Books, p. 936, ISBN 0465037658, Url
- Lavery, Brian (1989), Nelson's Navy: The Ships, Men, and Organization, 1793–1815,
  Naval Institute Press, p. 352, ISBN 9781591146117, Url
- Lee, Christopher (2005). Nelson and Napoleon, The Long Haul to Trafalgar
  Headline books, 560 pages, ISBN 0-7553-1041-1, Url
- Laughton, M.A., John Knox, (1886), (P) Letters and despatches of Horatio, viscount Nelson: duke of Bronte, vice admiral of the White squadron ,
  Longmans, Green, 456 pages, E'Book
- Longridge, Charles Nepean; Bowness. Edward, (1981), The Anatomy of Nelson's Ships,
  Naval Institute Press, 283 pages, ISBN 9780870210778, Url
- Mahan, Alfred Thayer (1918). The life of Nelson: the embodiment of the sea power of Great Britain
  Little, Brown and Co., Boston, 525 pages, ISBN 1843831309, E'book
- Nelson, Horatio; Nicholas, Sir Nicholas Harris (1845). The dispatches and letters of vice admiral ... Nelson, Vol II, 1795–1797, with notes by sir N.H. Nicolas.
  Henry Colburn, London, 522 pages. E'Book
- ——; Harris, Sir Nicholas, (P) (1846). The Dispatches And Letters, Volume 7
  Henry Colburn, London, p. 814, E'Book
- —— (1846). The dispatches and letters of vice admiral ... Nelson, Vol VI, May, 1804 – July, 1805, with notes by sir N.H. Nicolas.
  Henry Colburn, London. p. 510. E'Book
- ——; Maffeo, Steven E., Ed.; (P) (2007), Seize, burn, or sink: the thoughts and words of Admiral Lord Horatio Nelson,
  Scarecrow Press, 629 pages, ISBN 9780810857810, Book
- —— (1846). The dispatches and letters of vice admiral ... Nelson, Vol VI, Sept.1799 – Dec.1801, with notes by sir N.H. Nicolas.
  Henry Colburn, London, 5110 pages. E'Book
- ——, Warner & Hanna, Eds. (1806). Memoirs of the Life of the Late Lord H. Nelson
  Fryer & Clark, Baltimore, 119 pages, E'book
- Pettigrew, Thom. Jos (1849). Memoirs of the Life of Vice-Admiral Lord Viscount Nelson, Volume 1.
  T and W Boone, London. p. 514. E'Book
- "Ships of the Old Navy A history of the sailing ships of the Royal Navy by Michael Phillips". The Age of Nelson / Michael Phillips.
- Southey, Robert (1896). Robert Southey's Life of Nelson
  Longmans, Green, and Co., London, Bombay. p. 302, E'Book
- Walder, David (1978). Nelson: A Biography
  Dial Press/J. Wade, p. 538, Book
- Warner, Oliver, (1958). A portrait of Lord Nelson,
  Chatto & Windus, p. 372, Book
- ——, (1965). Nelson's Battles
  B.T. Batsford Limited, p. 254, Book
For other sources for Admiral Nelson see Royal Navy

=== Battle of Copenhagen ===
- Clark, James Stainer; M'Arthur, John (1810) The life of Admiral Lord Nelson, K.B., from his lordship's manuscripts
  T. Bensley, London, 702 pages, E'Book, Url
- Feldbæk, Ole (2002) The battle of Copenhagen: Nelson and the Danes
  Naval Institute Press, p. 270, ISBN 978-0-143-03795-8, Book
- Southey, Robert (1896) Robert Southey's Life of Nelson
  Longmans, Green, and Co., London, Bombay, p. 302, E'book

=== Battle of Trafalgar ===
- Adkin, Mark (2005). The Trafalgar Companion: A Guide to History's Most Famous Sea Battle and the Life of Admiral Lord Nelson.
  Aurum Press, London, 448 pages. ISBN 1-84513-018-9. Book
- Adkins, Roy (2004) Trafalgar: The Biography of a Battle
  Little Brown, 416 pages, ISBN 0-316-72511-0, Book
- —— (2005). Nelson's Trafalgar, The Battle That Changed the World (1st ed.). London:
  Penguin Books. p. 392. ISBN 978-0-143-03795-8.
- Allen, Joseph (1853). Battles of the British navy, Volume 1.
  Henry G. Bohn, London. p. 532. E'Book
- Colomb, Philip Howard. The battle of Trafalgar.
  W. Clowes & sons, limited, 1905. p. 18. Url
- Corbett, Sir Julian Stafford. The campaign of Trafalgar, Volume 2.
  Longmans, Green, and co., 1919. p. 538. Url
- Davies, David Tudor (1996). Nelson's navy: English fighting ships, 1793–1815
  Stackpole Books, Penn., p. 201, ISBN 978-0-8117-1118-0, Url
- Dull, Jonathan R. (2009). The Age of the Ship of the Line: The British and French Navies, 1650–1815.
  Univ of Nebraska Press. p. 268. ISBN 978-0-8032-1930-4. Url
- Fraser, Edward (1906). The enemy at Trafalgar: an account of the battle from eye-witnesses' narratives and letters and despatches from the French and Spanish fleets.
  E.P.Dutton & Co., New York. p. 436. E'Book
- Harbron, John D. (1988). Trafalgar and the Spanish navy.
  Naval Institute Press. p. 178. Url
- Hibbert, Christopher (1995). Nelson: A Personal History.
  Basic Books. p. 472. ISBN 0-201-40800-7. Url
- Nicolson, Adam (2005). Men of honour: Trafalgar and the making of the English hero.
  HarperCollins. p. 341. Url
- Nova Scotia. Vice-admiralty court, Halifax (1911). American vessels captured by the British during the revolution and war of 1812.
  The Essex Institute, Salem Massachusetts. p. 166. Url'
- Yonge, Charles Duke (1863). The history of the British Navy: from the earliest period to the present time: in two volumes, Volume 2.
  Bentley. p. 809. Url
- Warwick, Peter (2005) Voices from the Battle of Trafalgar
  David & Charles, p. 320, ISBN 9780715325568, Book
- —— (2011) Trafalgar
  David & Charles, p. 352, ISBN 9780715339169, Book

== See also ==
- List of naval battles
- List of Royal Navy ships
- List of ship names of the Royal Navy (a full historical list)
- List of early warships of the English navy
- List of ships captured in the 18th century
- List of ships captured in the 19th century
- List of frigate classes of the Royal Navy
- List of single-ship actions
- Glossary of nautical terms (disambiguation)
