= BNS Nishan =

History

Bangladesh
- Name: BNS Nishan
- Ordered: 30 June 2014
- Builder: Khulna Shipyard
- Laid down: 6 September 2015
- Launched: 15 March 2017
- Commissioned: 8 November 2017
- Identification: Pennant number:P 815; MMSI number: 405000219
- Status: In active service

General characteristics
- Class & type: Durjoy-class large patrol craft
- Displacement: 648 tons
- Length: 64.2 m (211 ft) (overall)
- Beam: 9 m (30 ft)
- Draught: 5.25 m (17.2 ft)
- Propulsion: 2 x SEMT Pielstick 12PA6 diesel engines; 2 x shafts
- Speed: 25 knots (46 km/h)
- Range: 2,000 nmi (3,700 km; 2,300 mi)
- Endurance: 15 days
- Complement: 70 personnel
- Sensors & processing systems: SR47AG surface and air search radar; TR47C Fire Control Radar for main gun; JMA 3336 navigational radar, X-band; Vision Master chart radar; ESS-2B bow mounted sonar
- Armament: 1 × NG 16-1 76.2 mm naval gun; 1 × CS/AN2 30 mm naval gun; 2 × triple torpedo tubes for ET-52C torpedoes

BNS Nishan is a Durjoy-class semi-stealth large patrol craft of the Bangladesh Navy. She has been serving the Bangladesh Navy since 2017.

== Career ==
The ship was launched on 15 March 2017. Honorable President of the Bangladesh, Md. Abdul Hamid commissioned the ship to the Bangladesh Navy on 8 November 2017.

On 10 September 2018, fishing trawler Swadhin-3 sank near Mongla port after a collision with a commercial vessel. 12 fishermen were on board the fishing trawler. BNS Turag responded quickly to rescue 9 fishermen. Later BNS Nishan joined the operation along with BNS Meghna to search for the other three fishermen.

== Design ==
BNS Nishan (P815) is of 64.2 metres (211 ft) long, 9 metres (30 ft) wide and have a 5.25 metres (17.2 ft) draught with a displacement of 648 tonnes. The ship has a bulbous bow that suggests it is very stable in heavy seas. It has the speed and range to support long lasting missions. The craft is powered by two SEMT Pielstick 12PA6 diesels driving three screws for a top speed of 25 knots (46 km/h; 29 mph). The range of the ship is 2,000 nautical miles (3,700 km; 2,300 mi) and endurance is 15 days. It has a complement of 70 crews. She was mainly made to be used as anti-submarine warfare ship.

=== Electronics ===
The primary sensor of the ship is a SR47AG surface and air search radar. The ship carries a Chinese TR47C fire control radar for main gun. For navigation, the ship uses the Japanese JMA 3336 radar. To help the navigational radar, the Vision Master chart radar is used. The ship has an ESS-2B bow mounted sonar with an effective range of about 8,000 metres (8,700 yd) for underwater detection.

=== Armament ===
The ASW LPC uses a Chinese origin single 76.2 mm (3 in) NG 16-1 naval gun as the primary gun. The vessel is also equipped with one CS/AN2 30 mm (1.2 in) single-barrel naval gun mounted amidships used as the secondary gun. She is armed with two triple 324 mm (13 in) torpedo tubes for ET-52C torpedo.

== See also ==
- List of active ships of the Bangladesh Navy
