= HMS Dumbarton Castle (P265) =

Offshore patrol vessel of the British Royal Navy

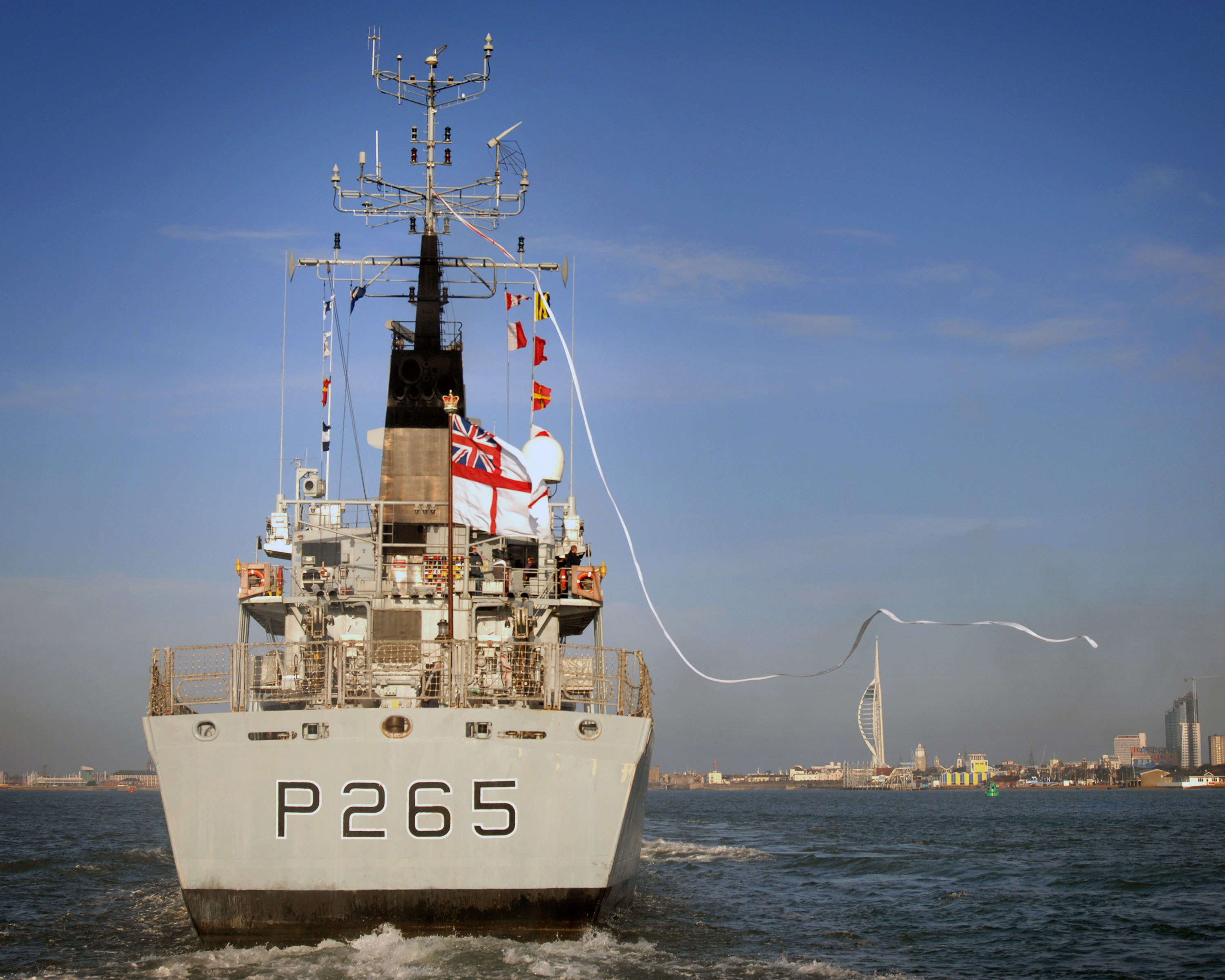
- HMS Dumbarton Castle entering Portsmouth Harbour prior to decommissioning

History

United Kingdom
- Name: HMS Dumbarton Castle
- Ordered: 8 August 1980
- Builder: Hall, Russell & Company
- Laid down: 25 June 1980
- Launched: 3 June 1981
- Commissioned: 12 March 1982
- Decommissioned: 2008
- Identification: Pennant number: P265; IMO number: 7920015
- Fate: Sold to Bangladesh; currently in service with the Bangladesh Navy as BNS Bijoy
- Notes: Refitted by A&P Group Tyne facility in 2010

General characteristics
- Class & type: Castle-class patrol vessel
- Displacement: 1,350 long tons (1,372 t) standard, 1,550 long tons (1,575 t) full load
- Length: 81.0 m (265 ft 9 in) overall, 75.0 m (246 ft 1 in)
- Beam: 11.5 m (37 ft 9 in)
- Draught: 3.42 m (11 ft 3 in)
- Ice class: 1A
- Installed power: 5,640 bhp (4,210 kW)
- Propulsion: 2 × Ruston 12RK 320DM, 2 shafts
- Speed: 20 knots (37 km/h; 23 mph)
- Range: 19,000 nmi (35,000 km; 22,000 mi) at 12 kn (22 km/h; 14 mph)
- Boats & landing craft carried: 2× Avon Searaider dinghies
- Complement: 45 (+ accommodation for 25 Royal Marines)
- Sensors & processing systems: Kelvin Hughes Type 1006 navigation radar; Plessey Type 994 air/sea search radar
- Electronic warfare & decoys: UAN(1) radar warning, DLE rocket decay system
- Armament: Oerlikon / BMARC 30 mm L/75 KCB gun on single Laurence Scott DS-30B mount; 4 × L7 General Purpose Machine Guns; 1 x H/PJ-26 76 mm main gun (in Bangladesh service); 4 × C-704 ASHM (in Bangladesh service); 2 × Oerlikon 20 mm auto cannons (in Bangladesh service)
- Aircraft carried: Flight deck can support up to Westland Sea King-size helicopter

HMS Dumbarton Castle (P265) was an offshore patrol vessel of the British Royal Navy. Her main role was the protection of the offshore assets of the United Kingdom, including oil and gas installations and fisheries out to the 200-nautical-mile (370 km; 230 mi) limit.

She spent much of her time deployed in the South Atlantic as guard ship, patrolling around the Falkland Islands and South Georgia, alternating with her sister ship HMS Leeds Castle. Her long association with the Falkland Islands resulted in the ship's company being given permission to add her name to the roll of honour written in white rocks on the hillside opposite Stanley in 2007.

== Design and construction ==
The Castle class was designed for fisheries protection and oilfield patrol duties in the United Kingdom's exclusive economic zone (EEZ). They were a follow-on to the interim Island-class patrol vessel which had been ordered in 1975 when the EEZ was extended to 200 miles, and as a result of initial experience with the Islands, was considerably longer in order to improve seakeeping in heavy seas, with the extra length giving greater speed from the same power as the Islands and allowing a large helicopter deck to be fitted.

Dumbarton Castle was 81.0 metres (265 ft 9 in) long overall and 75.0 m (246 ft 1 in) between perpendiculars, with a beam of 11.5 m (37 ft 9 in) and a draught of 3.42 m (11 ft 3 in). Displacement was 1,350 long tons (1,372 t) standard and 1,550 long tons (1,575 t) full load. The ship was powered by two Ruston 12RK 320 DM diesel engines rated at 5,460 brake horsepower (4,070 kW) (with a maximum sustained power of 4,380 bhp (3,270 kW), driving two shafts fitted with controllable pitch propellers. This gave a speed of 20 knots (37 km/h; 23 mph). The ship had a range of 10,000 nautical miles (19,000 km; 12,000 mi) at 12 knots (22 km/h; 14 mph).

The ship was initially armed with a single Bofors 40 mm L/60 gun, although by 1990 this had been replaced by an Oerlikon 30 mm gun on a DS30B mount. The main armament was supplemented by two 7.62 mm machine guns. A large helicopter deck was fitted aft, suitable for landing a Sea King or Chinook helicopter, but no hangar was provided, as the cost of a permanently embarked helicopter would be more than the cost of the ship. She was fitted with Type 1006 navigation radar, which was supplemented with a Type 994 air/surface search radar in 1986, together with a UAN(1) electronic intercept system (based on the Orange Crop system fitted to the Royal Navy's helicopters. The ship had a crew of 6 officers and 39 other ranks, with room for a 25-man detachment of Royal Marines to be carried. (Note: Jane's Fighting Ships lists a crew of 50, plus the 25-man Marine detachment. The ship had a crew of 52 when she set out on her 1991 deployment to the Falklands.)

Dumbarton Castle was laid down at Hall, Russell & Company's Aberdeen shipyard as yard number 986 on 25 April 1980 as the second Castle-class patrol vessel. This was in advance of a formal order for the two ships being placed, which did not take place until 8 August that year. She was launched on 3 June 1981, and was completed on 12 March 1982.

== Service ==
Dumbarton Castle commissioned at Rosyth on 26 March 1982, and was assigned the pennant number P265. In April 1982, the Falklands War began when Argentine forces invaded the Falkland Islands on 2 April. Dumbarton Castle sailed from her base at Rosyth on 26 April for HMNB Portsmouth to be fitted with additional communications equipment and a desalination plant to better suit her to support the British task force sailing to retake the Falklands. Dumbarton Castle left Portsmouth on 1 May, arriving at Ascension Island on 11 May, where she was employed as a despatch vessel, ferrying stores between Ascension and the Task Force, and between warships of the task force. She returned to Rosyth in August 1982. Dumbarton Castle was awarded the battle honour "Falkland Islands 1982" for her service in the war.

Both Dumbarton Castle and sister ship Leeds Castle were employed as guardships for the Falklands as well as for more normal fishery protection duties in home waters. In August 1991, Dumbarton Castle relieved Leeds Castle at the start of a three-year deployment to the Falklands, and from 1998 to 2000, carried out another three year deployment to the South Atlantic. In 2001, Dumbarton Castle was converted to serve as a command ship for mine countermeasures vessels

Dumbarton Castle was replaced by the River-class offshore patrol vessel, HMS Clyde, in 2007, returning to Portsmouth after her last patrol on 22 November that year.

Both Dumbarton Castle and her sister were sold to Bangladesh in April 2010. Dumbarton Castle left Portsmouth on 21 May 2010 towed by the tug Multratug 7, for A&P Group facility in Newcastle upon Tyne for a major regeneration project with her sister ship Leeds Castle. The project was completed in December 2010.

In March 2011, Leeds Castle and Dumbarton Castle were recommissioned as BNS Dhaleshwari and BNS Bijoy of the Bangladesh Navy respectively. On 4 August 2020 BNS Bijoy, was damaged in the 2020 Beirut Port Explosions while part of the United Nations Interim Force in Lebanon.
