= HMS St David (M07) =

Royal Navy minesweeper

History

United Kingdom
- Name: St David
- Builder: Cubow of Woolwich
- Commissioned: 30 November 1978
- Decommissioned: November 1983
- Renamed: Suffolk Monarch (1973); HMS St David (1978); Suffolk Monarch (1983); Britannia Monarch (1990); VOS Monarch (2009)
- Identification: IMO number: 7234296
- Fate: Scrapped in 2011

General characteristics
- Class & type: Venturer-class minesweeper
- Length: 120 ft (37 m)
- Beam: 29.2 ft (8.9 m)
- Draught: 12.8 ft (3.9 m)
- Installed power: 2,000 hp (1,500 kW)
- Propulsion: 2 x diesel engines
- Speed: 14 knots (26 km/h; 16 mph)
- Complement: 35

HMS St David was a Venturer-class minesweeper converted from the fishing trawler Suffolk Monarch for the Royal Navy in 1978.

== Description ==
St David was 120 ft (37 m) long, 29.2 ft (8.9 m) wide, and 12.8 ft (3.9 m) tall. It had a gross tonnage of 422 GT. It was powered by Mirrlees-Blackstone diesel engines which provided 2,000 hp (1,500 kW) and allowed for a speed of 14 knots (26 km/h; 16 mph). As a minesweeper, Venturer was not equipped with any armament and had a crew of thirty-five.

== History ==
The ship was built as Suffolk Monarch by Cubow of Woolwich in 1973 as a stern fishing trawler and was sold to Small & Co. Harvester was then chartered as HMS St David by the Ministry of Defence on 1 November 1978, alongside its sister ship HMS Venturer. It was converted into a minesweeper at Lowestoft and commissioned in Bristol on 30 November 1978. St David was allocated to the 10th Mine Countermeasures Squadron out of Cardiff and was equipped for deep team minesweeping.

On completion of its charter, St David was returned to civilian service in November 1983 and renamed back to Suffolk Monarch in a new role as a standby safety vessel. In 1990, the ship transferred ownership to Britannia Marine of Lowestoft and was renamed Britannia Monarch. It changed owners again to Vroon Offshore Services and was renamed again to VOS Monarch in 2009, and was taken out of service in 2010. The ship was scrapped in Alang, India, in 2011.
