= HMS Warspite =

Seven ships of the Royal Navy have been named Warspite. The origins of the name are unclear, although it is probably from the word spight – an Elizabethan-era spelling variation of both spite and speight – in part embodying contempt for the Navy's enemies, but which was also the common name for the green woodpecker, suggesting the 'Warspight' would poke holes in enemy ships' (wooden) hulls. Until 1919 a woodpecker was used as the ships' crest; the official badge was a cannon, although the woodpecker continued to be used on the ships' tompions or gun muzzle plugs. Warspite carries the most battle honours of any ship in the Royal Navy, with the sixth Warspite being awarded fifteen of them.

- English ship Warspite (1596) was a 29-gun galleon, originally known as Warspight. She was launched in 1596 and sold in 1649.
- HMS Warspite (1666) was a 70-gun third-rate ship of the line launched in 1666. She was renamed HMS Edinburgh in 1721, rebuilt three times and broken up in 1771.
- HMS Warspite (1758) was a 74-gun third rate launched in 1758. She was on harbour service from 1778, was renamed HMS Arundel in 1800 and was broken up in 1801.
- HMS Warspite (1807) was a 76-gun third rate launched in 1807, razeed in 1840 and paid off in 1846. Lent to The Marine Society in 1862, she became a training ship until destroyed by fire in 1876.
- HMS Warspite (1884) was an Imperieuse-class first-class armoured cruiser launched in 1884 and scrapped in 1905.
- HMS Warspite (03) was a Queen Elizabeth-class battleship launched in 1913. She served in the First World War and in numerous operations in the Second World War, earning the most battle honours of any Royal Navy ship. She ran aground on her way to be broken up in 1947 and was scrapped in 1950.
- HMS Warspite (S103) was a Valiant-class nuclear-powered submarine launched in 1965 and decommissioned in 1991. She is currently awaiting disposal.
- HMS Warspite is the third planned Dreadnought-class ballistic missile submarine.

== Battle honours ==
- Cadiz 1596
- Orfordness 1666
- Sole Bay 1672
- Schooneveld 1673
- Texel 1673
- Barfleur 1692
- Velez Malaga 1705
- Marbella 1705
- Lagos 1759
- Quiberon 1759
- Jutland 1916
- Atlantic 1939
- Narvik 1940
- Norway 1940
- Calabria 1940
- Mediterranean 1940–43
- Malta Convoys 1941
- Matapan 1941
- Crete 1941
- Sicily 1943
- Salerno 1943
- English Channel 1944
- Normandy 1944
- Biscay 1944
- Walcheren 1944

== See also ==
- Warspite, Alberta, a hamlet in Alberta, Canada

== General and cited references ==
- Colledge, J. J.; Warlow, Ben (2006) [1969]. Ships of the Royal Navy: The Complete Record of All Fighting Ships of the Royal Navy from the 15th Century to the Present (3rd Rev ed.). London: Chatham Publishing. ISBN 978-1-86176-281-8. OCLC 67375475.
- Gardiner, Robert, ed. (1979). Conway's All the World's Fighting Ships 1860–1905. Greenwich, UK: Conway Maritime Press. ISBN 0-8317-0302-4.
- Weightman, A. E. (1957). Heraldry in the Royal Navy: Crests and Badges of H.M. Ships. Aldershot, UK: Gale & Polden. OCLC 776637247.
