= Warspite, Alberta =

Warspite
- Hamlet
- Location of Warspite in Alberta
- Coordinates: 54.0911°N 112.6144°W
- Country: Canada
- Province: Alberta
- Census division: No. 12
- Municipal district: Smoky Lake County

Government
  - Type: Unincorporated
  - Governing body: Smoky Lake County Council

Area (2021)
  - Land: 0.78 km^{2} (0.30 sq mi)
- Elevation: 655 m (2,149 ft)

Population (2021)
  - Total: 70
  - Density: 90/km^{2} (230/sq mi)
- Time zone: UTC−06:00 (Alberta Time)

Warspite is a hamlet in Alberta, Canada within Smoky Lake County. It is located on Highway 28, between the Town of Smoky Lake and Village of Waskatenau. It has an elevation of 655 metres (2,149 ft).

The hamlet is located in Census Division No. 12 and in the federal riding of Westlock-St. Paul.

== History ==
The first post office was opened in 1914 as Smoky Lake Centre. It was renamed Warspite in 1916 for HMS Warspite after the Battle of Jutland.

== Demographics ==
In the 2021 Census of Population conducted by Statistics Canada, Warspite had a population of 70 living in 40 of its 51 total private dwellings, a change of −7.9% from its 2016 population of 76. With a land area of 0.78 km^{2} (0.30 sq mi), it had a population density of 89.7/km^{2} (232.4/sq mi) in 2021.

As a designated place in the 2016 Census of Population conducted by Statistics Canada, Warspite had a population of 76 living in 41 of its 54 total private dwellings, a change of −3.8% from its 2011 population of 79. With a land area of 0.78 km^{2} (0.30 sq mi), it had a population density of 97.4/km^{2} (252.4/sq mi) in 2016.

== See also ==
- List of communities in Alberta
- List of former urban municipalities in Alberta
- List of hamlets in Alberta
