= HMS Venturer (M08) =

Royal Navy minesweeper

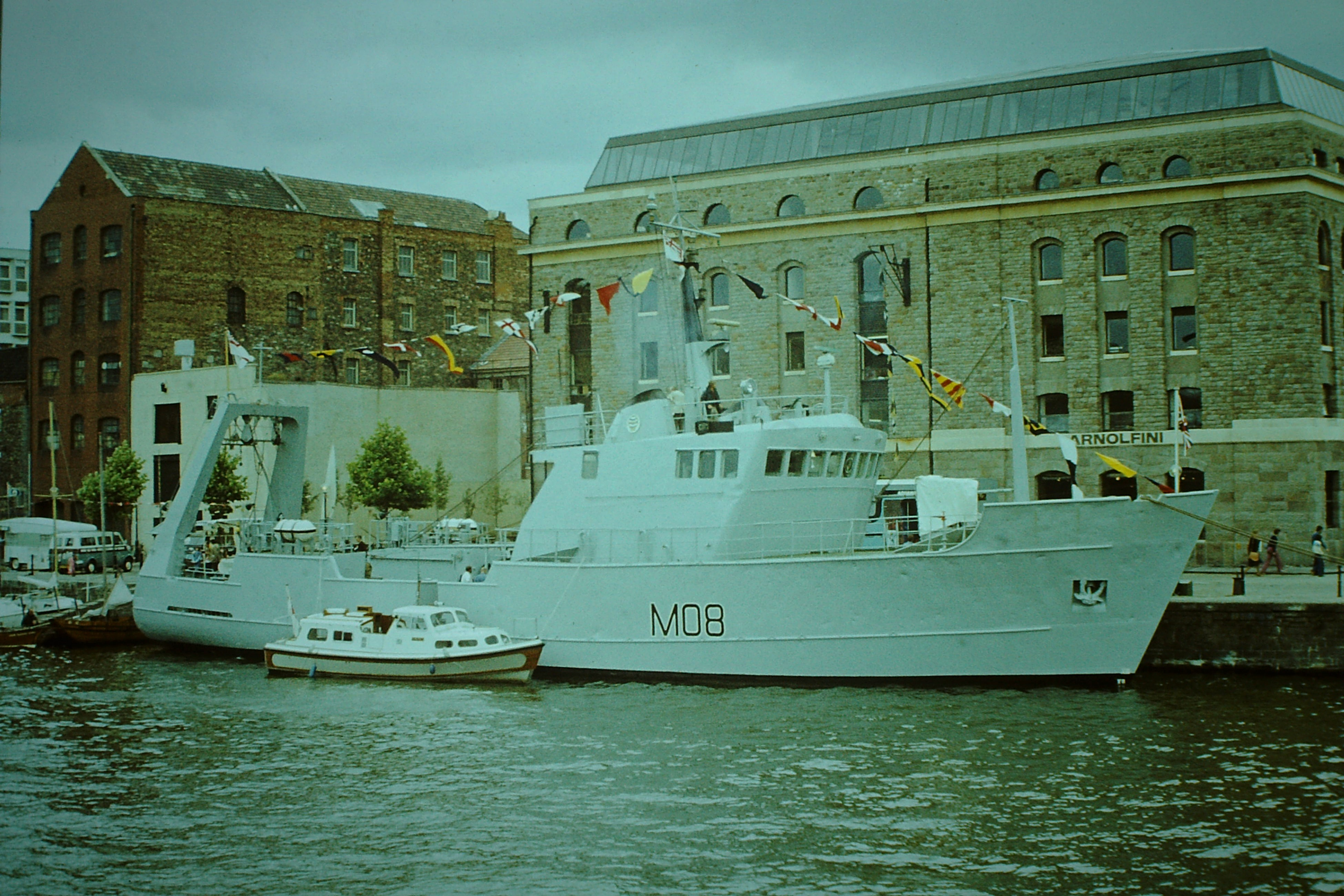
- HMS Venturer at Bristol Harbor in 1979

History

United Kingdom
- Name: HMS Venturer
- Builder: Cubow of Woolwich
- Launched: 1973
- Commissioned: December 1978
- Decommissioned: November 1983
- Renamed: Suffolk Harvester (1972); HMS Venturer (1978); Suffolk Harvester (1983); Britannia Harvester (1990); VOS Harvester (2009); BPOS Harvester (2011)
- Identification: IMO number: 7210848; MMSI number: 621819056
- Status: In service

General characteristics
- Class & type: Venturer-class minesweeper
- Type: Trawler, minesweeper, standby safety vessel
- Length: 120 ft (37 m)
- Beam: 29.2 ft (8.9 m)
- Draught: 12.8 ft (3.9 m)
- Installed power: 2000 HP
- Propulsion: 2x Diesel Engine
- Speed: 14 knots
- Complement: 35
- Armament: None

HMS Venturer is a Venturer-class minesweeper converted from the trawler Suffolk Harvester for the Royal Navy in 1978.

== Description ==
Venturer is 120 ft (37 m) long, 29.2 ft (8.9 m) wide, and 12.8 ft (3.9 m) tall. It has a gross tonnage of 433 GT. It is powered by Mirrlees-Blackstone diesel engines which provided 2,000 HP and allowed for a speed of 14 knots. As a minesweeper, Venturer was not equipped with any armament and had a crew of thirty-five.

== History ==
The ship was built as Suffolk Harvester by Cubow of Woolwich in 1972 as a stern fishing trawler and was sold to Small & Co as the most advanced new ship in its fleet. Harvester was then chartered as HMS Venturer by the Ministry of Defence on 1 November 1978, alongside its sister ship HMS St David. It was converted into a minesweeper at Lowestoft and commissioned in Bristol in December 1978. Venturer was allocated to the 10th Mine Countermeasures Squadron out of Bristol and was equipped for deep team minesweeping.

On completion of its charter, Venturer was returned to civilian service in November 1983 and renamed back to Suffolk Harvester. In 1990, the ship transferred ownership and was renamed Britannia Harvester. It was renamed again to VOS Harvester in 2009, and finally to BPOS Harvester in 2011. In May 2020, the vessel was temporarily laid up at Lowestoft following the outbreak of the COVID-19 pandemic. As of 2022, the vessel was flying the flag of Djibouti and operating as a standby safety vessel.
