= Devonport Naval Heritage Centre =

Maritime museum in Plymouth, England

Coordinates: 50.383°N 4.183°W

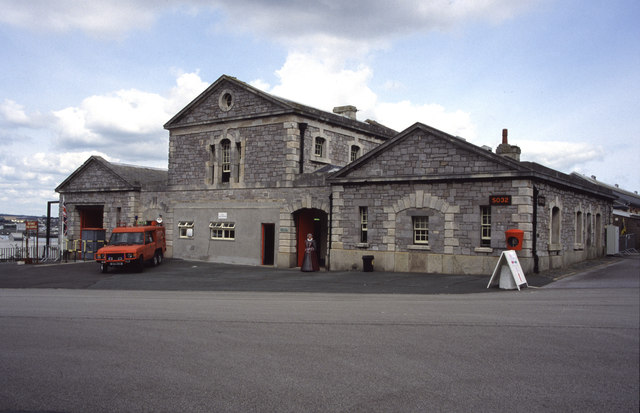
Plymouth Naval Base Museum was established in the former Fire Station (of 1851) within the South Yard of HMNB Devonport.

Devonport Naval Heritage Centre, formerly known as the Plymouth Naval Base Museum is a maritime museum in Plymouth, Devon. It is housed in a number of historic buildings within the South Yard of HM Naval Base, Devonport (one of the three main bases of the Royal Navy). Its mission statement is "To present the story of support to the Royal Navy at Plymouth since the days of Edward I."

== History ==
The museum was established in the Grade II listed former Dockyard Fire Station building in 1969, following an appeal from the office of the Admiral-superintendent for items of memorabilia. It has since expanded into the Grade II* listed Pay Office, while the Scrieve Board (a Grade II* listed 18th-century slip cover) currently serves as a museum store.

== Collections ==
=== Galleries ===
The Dockyard Fire Station contains the Age of Sail Gallery.

The Pay Office contains galleries covering the transition from sail to steam, and through two World Wars, to the era of nuclear propulsion:

- The Warspite Gallery
- The Devonport Gallery
- The Courageous Gallery

It also contains exhibitions and displays about:

- Victualling Through the Ages
- Uniform Through the Ages
- Post War Model Ships

=== Figureheads ===
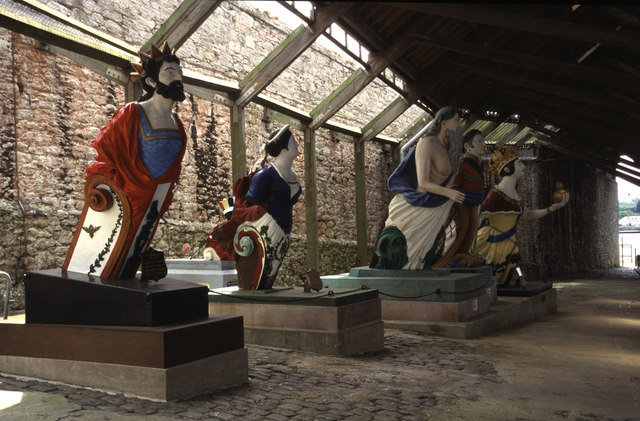
The historic figureheads were formerly displayed under No. 1 Slip cover in the South Yard.

In 2020 the museum's collection of thirteen historic Royal Naval figureheads was transferred to the Plymouth City Museum and Art Gallery and (after extensive restoration work had been carried out) they were put on display in a new gallery there called 'The Box'.

=== HMS Courageous ===
The nuclear-powered submarine HMS Courageous, used in the Falklands War, is managed by the Heritage Centre as a museum ship (though it is currently 'closed to the general public until further notice').

== Opening times ==
As of 2023 the museum is open March-October every Wednesday from 10 a.m. – 4 p.m. (and also on occasional Saturdays). There is no entry charge (though donations are requested); and, since the museum no longer lies within a restricted part of the yard, there is no requirement for visitors to book in advance.

== Future ==
Discussions were underway in 2014 around removing the museum from the Dockyard and displaying some of its collections within an expanded Plymouth City Museum and Art Gallery.

More recently, in 2018, the National Museum of the Royal Navy announced a 12-year project to try to establish a 'full-time visitor attraction' in Devonport, to be based within the South Yard and focused around the decommissioned submarine HMS Courageous.

== See also ==
- National Museum of the Royal Navy
- Plymouth City Museum and Art Gallery
