= HMS Churchill (S46) =

1970 Churchill-class nuclear-powered fleet submarine of the Royal Navy

- HMS Churchill at sea

History

United Kingdom
- Name: HMS Churchill
- Namesake: Winston Churchill
- Ordered: 21 October 1965
- Laid down: 30 June 1967
- Launched: 20 December 1968
- Commissioned: 15 July 1970
- Decommissioned: 28 February 1991
- Fate: Awaiting disposal
- Badge

General characteristics
- Class & type: Churchill-class submarine
- Displacement: 4,900 tonnes (4,823 long tons) submerged
- Length: 86.9 m (285 ft 1 in)
- Beam: 10.1 m (33 ft 2 in)
- Draught: 8.2 m (26 ft 11 in)
- Propulsion: 1 Rolls-Royce PWR nuclear reactor, 1 shaft
- Speed: 28 knots (32 mph; 52 km/h) submerged
- Complement: 103
- Armament: 6 × 533 mm (21 in) torpedo tubes; Mark 8 torpedoes; Tigerfish torpedoes; RN Sub Harpoon missiles

HMS Churchill was the first of three Churchill-class (Note: Some sources call Churchill a "Repeat Valiant", while others treat Churchill as a member of the five-submarine Valiant class.) nuclear fleet submarines that served with the Royal Navy.

== Construction ==
In 1965, following a decision by the Labour government not to build a fifth Resolution class ballistic missile submarine, production of nuclear-powered fleet submarines, which had been postponed owing to the priority given to the Polaris programme, could be restarted. Churchill, the Royal Navy's fourth nuclear-powered fleet submarine was ordered on 21 October 1965, and was laid down at Vickers Shipbuilding and Engineering Limited (VSEL)'s Barrow-in-Furness shipyard on 30 June 1967. Following a collision between sister submarine Warspite and a Soviet Echo II-class submarine in the Barents Sea on 9 October 1968, the fin of Churchill, still under construction at Barrow, was used to replace Warspite's fin, which had been badly damaged in the collision. Churchill was launched by Mary Soames, Winston Churchill's youngest daughter, on 20 December 1968, and commissioned on 15 July 1970.

== Propulsion ==
Churchill was chosen to trial the first full-size submarine pump jet propulsion. Trials of a high-speed unit were followed by further trials with a low-speed unit, and these were successful enough for the same propulsion to be fitted in the rest of the class. Later British submarine classes also featured the pump jet, although first-of-class vessels Swiftsure and Trafalgar were fitted with propellers at build.
