= BNS Dhaleshwari =

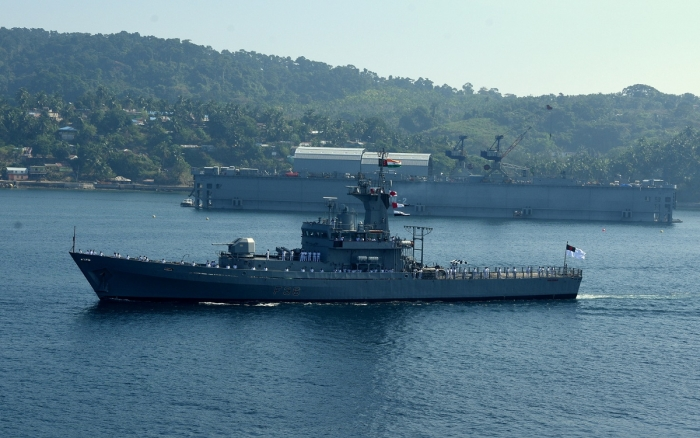
- BNS Dhaleshwari during 2018 Milan exercise

History

Bangladesh
- Name: BNS Dhaleshwari
- Builder: Hall, Russell & Company
- Acquired: December 2010
- Commissioned: 5 March 2011
- Home port: Mongla
- Identification: Pennant number: F 36; IMO number: 7920003
- Status: In active service

General characteristics
- Class & type: Castle-class corvette
- Displacement: 1,430 tons
- Length: 81 m (265.7 ft)
- Beam: 11.5 m (37.7 ft)
- Draught: 3.6 m (11.8 ft)
- Propulsion: 2 × Ruston 12RKC 5,640 bhp (4,210 kW) diesels, 2 shafts
- Speed: 18 knots (33 km/h; 21 mph) max; 12 knots (22 km/h; 14 mph) cruise
- Range: 10,000 nautical miles (19,000 km) at 10 knots (19 km/h)
- Complement: 45 + accommodation for 25 SWADS
- Electronic warfare & decoys: Type 360 Radar Surface Search, E/F band; Type 348 fire control radar for main gun; Kelvin Hughes SharpEye surveillance radar, S band; Kelvin Hughes SharpEye navigation radar, X band
- Armament: 1 x H/PJ-26 76 mm main gun; 4 × C-704 AShM; 2 × Oerlikon 20 mm auto cannons
- Aviation facilities: Flight deck

BNS Dhaleshwari is a Castle-class guided missile corvette of the Bangladesh Navy. The ship has served with the Bangladesh Navy since 2011.

== Description ==
The ship carries four C-704 automated anti-ship missiles. Besides these it also has one AK-176 main gun, and two Oerlikon 20 mm auto cannons. It has a flight deck which can accommodate helicopters up to Westland Sea King size.

== History ==
The ship was laid down by Hall, Russell & Company of Aberdeen, Scotland on 18 October 1979 and launched on 22 October 1980. She was commissioned into the Royal Navy as HMS Leeds Castle on 27 October 1981. She served the Royal Navy from 1981 to 2005, taking part in the Falklands War. The ship was decommissioned on 8 August 2005. In April 2010, she was sold to the Bangladesh Navy.

== Career ==
On 14 May 2010, the ship began a major refit and upgrade to suit the Bangladesh Navy's requirements, which continued until December 2010. On 5 March 2011, the ship was commissioned in the Bangladesh Navy as BNS Dhaleshwari. On her way to Bangladesh, she visited the port of Colombo, Sri Lanka on a goodwill visit from 29 to 31 January 2011.

BNS Dhaleshwari went to Malaysia to join the Langkawi International Maritime and Aerospace Exhibition 2011 (LIMA-2011) in November 2011.

In 2013, the ship fired four C-704 anti-ship missiles in a domestic naval exercise with all four of them hitting their target successfully.

She left Bangladesh on 8 May to take part in the International Maritime Defence Exhibition (IMDEX) Asia-2015 held at Singapore from 19 to 21 May 2015. The ship took part in Cooperation Afloat Readiness and Training(CARAT), an annual bilateral exercise with the United States Navy, in 2015.

BNS Dhaleshwari took part in multinational maritime exercise, 10th Exercise Milan held from 6 March to 13 March 2018 at Andaman and Nicobar Islands in India. The ship left its homeport Chittagong for Port Blair on 3 March 2018.

On 24 January 2019, BNS Dhaleshwari left Mongla for United Arab Emirates to take part in 14th International Defence Exhibition and Conference (IDEX)-2019 and 5th Navy Defense Exhibition (NAVDEX)-2019 to be held in February 2019. She came back home on 12 March 2019.

== See also ==
- List of active ships of the Bangladesh Navy
- BNS Bijoy
