= BNS Nirmul =

History

Bangladesh
- Name: BNS Nirmul
- Ordered: 2009
- Builder: Wuchang Shipyard
- Launched: 27 September 2012
- Acquired: February 2013
- Commissioned: 29 August 2013
- Home port: Chittagong
- Identification: Pennant number: P 813
- Status: In active service

General characteristics
- Class & type: Durjoy-class large patrol craft
- Displacement: 648 tonnes
- Length: 64.2 m (211 ft) (overall)
- Beam: 9 m (30 ft)
- Draught: 4 m (13 ft)
- Propulsion: 3 x SEMT Pielstick 12PA6 diesel engines; 3 x shafts
- Speed: 28 knots (52 km/h)
- Range: 2,500 nmi (4,600 km; 2,900 mi)
- Endurance: 15 days
- Complement: 60 personnel
- Sensors & processing systems: SR47AG surface and air search radar; Type 348 Fire Control Radar for main gun; JMA 3336 navigational radar, X band; ESS-3 bow mounted sonar
- Armament: 1 x H/PJ-26 76.2 mm naval gun; 2 x 2 Oerlikon 20 mm cannon; 2 x 2 C-704 AShM; 2 x 6-tube EDS-25A 250 mm ASW rocket launcher; Decoys

BNS Nirmul is a Durjoy-class semi-stealth large patrol craft (LPC) of the Bangladesh Navy. She is the second ship of the class. She entered service with the Bangladesh Navy in 2013.

== Design ==
{{{2}}}

BNS Nirmul is of 64.2 metres (211 ft) long, 9 metres (30 ft) wide and has a 4 metres (13 ft) draught with a displacement of 648 tonnes. The ship has a bulbous bow that suggests it is very stable in heavy sea states. It has speed and range to support long lasting missions. The LPC is powered by triple SEMT Pielstick 12PA6 diesels driving three screws for a top speed of 28 knots (52 km/h; 32 mph). The range of the ship is 2,500 nautical miles (4,600 km; 2,900 mi) and endurance is 15 days. It has a complement of 60. This ship is able to perform limited anti-submarine warfare operations.

=== Armament ===
The LPC is armed with a single 76.2 mm H/PJ-26 naval gun and four C-704 surface-to-surface missiles (SSM) mounted aft. In addition, it has two dual Oerlikon 20 mm cannon mounted amidships which can be used in an anti-aircraft role. For use in anti-submarine warfare (ASW) it has two forward-mounted 6-tube EDS-25A 250 mm ASW rocket launchers and decoy launchers.

=== Electronics ===
The primary sensor of the ship is a SR-47AG air and surface search radar. It carries Type 348 Fire Control Radar for main gun. The ship has one X band JMA 3336 navigation radar. She also has an ESS-3 bow mounted sonar with an effective range of about 8,000 metres (26,000 ft) for underwater detection. A JRCSS combat management system (CMS) with at least three multifunction consoles is also fitted in the ships.

== Career ==
BNS Nirmul was launched in Wuchang Shipyard of China on 27 September 2012. She reached Bangladesh in February 2013. On 29 August 2013, she commissioned in Bangladesh Navy as BNS Nirmul.

On 12 May 2014 the ship left for Lebanon to join in United Nations Interim Force in Lebanon (UNIFIL). She replaced BNS Madhumati there from 14 June 2014.

After completion of the UNIFIL deployment period, the ship visited the Port of Colombo from 7 to 9 February 2018 on her way back home. She also paid a goodwill visit to the Chennai Port of India from 14 February to 16 February 2018. On 18 February 2018, the ship reached its homeport Chittagong.

== See also ==
- List of active ships of the Bangladesh Navy
