= HMS Opportune (S20) =

Submarine of the Royal Navy

- HMS Opportune

History

United Kingdom
- Name: HMS Opportune
- Builder: Scotts, Greenock
- Yard number: 693
- Laid down: 26 October 1962
- Launched: 14 February 1964
- Commissioned: 29 December 1964
- Decommissioned: 2 June 1993
- Fate: Paid off

General characteristics as designed
- Class & type: Oberon class
- Displacement: 1,610 tons standard; 2,030 tons full load surfaced; 2,410 tons full load submerged
- Length: 241 feet (73 m) between perpendiculars; 295.2 feet (90.0 m) length overall
- Beam: 26.5 feet (8.1 m)
- Draught: 18 feet (5.5 m)
- Propulsion: 2 × Admiralty Standard Range 16 VMS diesel generators; 2 × 3,000 shaft horsepower (2,200 kW) electric motors; 2 shafts
- Speed: 17 knots (31 km/h; 20 mph) submerged; 12 knots (22 km/h; 14 mph) surfaced
- Complement: 68
- Sensors & processing systems: Type 186 and Type 187 sonars; I-band surface search radar
- Armament: 8 × 21-inch (530 mm) torpedo tubes (6 forward, 2 aft); 24 torpedoes

HMS Opportune (S20) was an Oberon-class submarine of the Royal Navy.

== Design and construction ==
The Oberon class was a direct follow on of the Porpoise-class, with the same dimensions and external design, but updates to equipment and internal fittings, and a higher grade of steel used for fabrication of the pressure hull.

As designed for British service, the Oberon-class submarines were 241 feet (73 m) in length between perpendiculars and 295.2 feet (90.0 m) in length overall, with a beam of 26.5 feet (8.1 m), and a draught of 18 feet (5.5 m). Displacement was 1,610 tons standard, 2,030 tons full load when surfaced, and 2,410 tons full load when submerged. Propulsion machinery consisted of 2 Admiralty Standard Range 16 VMS diesel generators, and two 3,000 shaft horsepower (2,200 kW) electric motors, each driving a 7-foot diameter (2.1 m) 3-bladed propeller at up to 400 rpm. Top speed was 17 knots (31 km/h; 20 mph) when submerged, and 12 knots (22 km/h; 14 mph) on the surface. Eight 21-inch (530 mm) diameter torpedo tubes were fitted (six facing forward, two aft), with a total payload of 24 torpedoes. The boats were fitted with Type 186 and Type 187 sonars, and an I-band surface search radar. The standard complement was 68: 6 officers, 62 sailors.

Opportune was laid down by Scotts Shipbuilding and Engineering Company on 26 October 1962, and launched on 14 February 1964. The boat was commissioned into the Royal Navy on 29 December 1964.

== Operational history ==
On 15 February 1967, Opportune was in collision with sister submarine Orpheus when Opportune was leaving Portsmouth harbour as Orpheus was entering at night and in heavy weather, with only minor damage caused. Orpheus's commanding officer was found guilty of hazarding his vessel and was reprimanded. In 1971, Opportune collided with a merchant ship, causing damage to the upper front part of the fin as well as both periscopes.

Opportune attended the 1977 Silver Jubilee Fleet Review off Spithead when she was part of the Submarine Flotilla.

== Decommissioning and fate ==
Opportune was paid off on 2 June 1993. For several years the vessel resided at Pounds scrapyard in Portsmouth. She was one of the final three conventionally powered submarines ever operated by the Royal Navy. She was paid off alongside her sister ships HMS Opossum and HMS Oracle.

Every year since the vessel was scrapped, senior rates from the boat have annually met together to celebrate their service and life on the boat.

== Publications ==
- Colledge, J. J.; Warlow, Ben (2006) [1969]. Ships of the Royal Navy: The Complete Record of All Fighting Ships of the Royal Navy from the 15th Century to the Present (3rd Rev ed.). London: Chatham Publishing. ISBN 978-1-86176-281-8. OCLC 67375475.
