= HMS Courageous (S50) =

1971 Churchill-class nuclear-powered fleet submarine of the Royal Navy

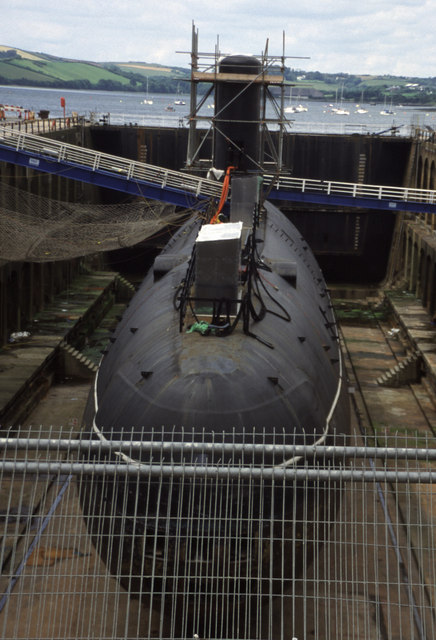
- Decommissioned HMS Courageous

History

United Kingdom
- Name: HMS Courageous
- Laid down: 15 May 1968
- Launched: 7 March 1970
- Commissioned: 16 October 1971
- Decommissioned: 10 April 1992
- Motto: Fortiter in Angustis; ("Bravely in straits")
- Status: Museum ship; 50°22′51.22″N 4°11′07.05″W
- Badge

General characteristics
- Class & type: Churchill-class submarine
- Displacement: 4,900 tonnes (submerged)
- Length: 86.9 m (285 ft 1 in)
- Beam: 10.1 m (33 ft 2 in)
- Draught: 8.2 m (26 ft 11 in)
- Propulsion: One nuclear reactor, one shaft
- Speed: 28 knots (52 km/h) submerged
- Complement: 103
- Armament: 6 × 533 mm (21 in) torpedo tubes; Mark 8 torpedoes; Mark 24 Tigerfish torpedoes; RN Sub Harpoon missiles

HMS Courageous (S50) is a decommissioned Churchill-class nuclear fleet submarine in service with the Royal Navy from 1971. She is now a museum ship managed by the Devonport Naval Heritage Centre.

In 2021, plans to set up a Cold War Centre around Courageous entered their first phase of implementation, supported by the National Museum of the Royal Navy.

== Operational history ==
In 1982, Courageous along with her sister ship, HMS Conqueror, was sent with the British task force to retake the Falkland Islands from the occupying Argentine forces. She returned home later in the year without damage. Courageous was retired from service in 1992.

During the HMNB Devonport Navy Days 2006, one of the members of the team restoring HMS Courageous pointed out that HMS Valiant was one of the first Royal Navy submarines to have her reactor removed. As Valiant had been cosmetically wrecked by this work, HMS Courageous was selected for the museum ship to represent the nuclear submarine fleet of the Royal Navy during the Cold War. Components were removed from HMS Valiant to restore Courageous. HMS Courageous was due to be moved in 2007 from her current berth to a new berth, due to development of the HMNB Devonport area where she resided.
