= Ole Feldbæk =

Danish historian

Ole Feldbæk (22 July 1936 – 1 October 2015) was a Danish historian.

He held the dr.philos. degree with the thesis India Trade under the Danish Flag 1772–1808 from 1969, and was professor of economic history at the University of Copenhagen from 1981 to 2006.

His books include Slaget på Reden (1985) and Gyldendals bog om Danmarks historie (2004), and he has been co-writer and editor of Politikens Danmarkshistorie vol. 1–16 (1988–1991), Dansk udenrigspolitiks historie vol. 1–6 (2001–2005) and Dansk identitetshistorie vol. 1–4 (1991–1992).

He received the Amalienborg Prize in 2001. He was a fellow of the Norwegian Academy of Science and Letters from 1996.
