= Durjoy-class patrol craft =

Class of large patrol craft

Class overview
- Builders: Wuchang Shipyard; Khulna Shipyard
- Operators: Bangladesh Navy
- Subclasses: Keris-class littoral mission ship
- Built: 2011–present
- In commission: 2013–present
- Completed: 4
- Active: 4

General characteristics
- Type: Large patrol craft
- Displacement: 648 tons
- Length: 64.2 m (211 ft) (overall)
- Beam: 9 m (30 ft)
- Draught: 4 m (13 ft)
- Propulsion: 2 x SEMT Pielstick 12PA6 diesels; 2 x shafts
- Speed: 28 knots (52 km/h) (anti-surface warfare) 25 knots (46 km/h) (Anti-submarine warfare)
- Range: 2,500 nmi (4,600 km; 2,900 mi) (anti-surface warfare) 2,000 nmi (3,700 km; 2,300 mi) (Anti-submarine warfare)
- Endurance: 15 days
- Complement: 60 personnel (anti-surface warfare) 70 personnel (Anti-submarine warfare)
- Sensors & processing systems: Anti-surface warfare variant: SR47AG surface and air search radar; TR47C Fire Control Radar for main gun; ESS-3 bow mounted sonar; Anti-submarine warfare variant: SR47AG surface and air search radar; TR47C Fire Control Radar for main gun; JMA 3336 navigational radar, X-band; Vision Master chart radar; ESS-2B bow mounted sonar
- Armament: anti-surface warfare variant: 1 x H/PJ-26 76.2 mm naval gun; 2 x 2 Oerlikon 20 mm cannon; 2 x 2 C-704 AShM; 2 x 6-tube EDS-25A 250 mm ASW rocket launcher; Anti-submarine warfare variant: 1 × NG 16-1 76.2 mm naval gun; 1 × CS/AN2 30 mm naval gun; 2 × triple torpedo tubes for ET-52C torpedoes

The Durjoy class is a class of large patrol craft of the Bangladesh Navy. A total of four are serving the Bangladesh Navy as of 2021.

== History ==
The Durjoy class is a class of large patrol crafts of the Bangladesh Navy, designed to meet the longer patrolling and surveillance needs in the vast EEZ of Bangladesh in the Bay of Bengal as well as to perform limited offensive roles. The ships of this class are of two variants, anti-surface warfare variant and anti-submarine warfare variant. The primary characteristics of the two variants are same but they differ in armaments and sensor suite.

Initially, a contract was signed in 2009 for two ships to be built at Wuchang Shipyard in China. The ships were of anti-surface warfare variant. The first, BNS Durjoy (P 811), was launched on 26 August 2012, while the second, BNS Nirmul (P 813), was launched on 27 September 2012. Both ships arrived in Bangladesh in February 2013. The ships were commissioned on 29 August 2013.

On 30 June 2014 the Bangladesh Navy signed a contract for the next two Durjoy-class vessels with Khulna Shipyard. These ships were constructed in Bangladesh under ToT from China. Keel laying of the ships was done on 6 September 2015. The first two vessels made at Khulna Shipyard were commissioned on 8 November 2017. These ships were of Anti-submarine warfare variant.

== Design ==
These ships are 64.2 metres (211 ft) long, 9 metres (30 ft) wide and have a 4 metres (13 ft) draught with a displacement of 648 tonnes. The ships have a bulbous bow shape, which suggests they are designed to sustain heavy sea states. The ships have speed and range to support long missions. The large patrol crafts are powered by SEMT Pielstick 12PA6 diesel engines driving three screws for a top speed of 28 knots (52 km/h; 32 mph) for anti-surface warfare variant and 25 knots (46 km/h; 29 mph) for anti-submarine warfare variant. The range of the ships is 2,500 nautical miles (4,600 km; 2,900 mi) for anti-surface warfare version and 2,000 nautical miles (3,700 km; 2,300 mi) for anti-submarine warfare version with an endurance of 15 days. The anti-surface warfare ships can carry 60 personnel while anti-submarine warfare ships can carry 70 personnel. They can carry one Rigid-hulled inflatable boat and has the support system to launch it.

=== Electronics ===
Anti-surface variant

The primary sensor of these ships is a SR47AG surface and air search radar. The ship carries a Chinese TR47C fire control radar for main gun. The ships also have an ESS-3 bow mounted sonar with an effective range of about 8,000 metres (26,000 ft) for underwater detection. A JRCSS combat management system (CMS) with at least three multifunction consoles is also fitted in the ships.

Anti-submarine variant

The primary sensor of these ships is a SR47AG surface and air search radar. They carries a Chinese TR47C fire control radar for main gun. For navigation, the ships use the Japanese JMA 3336 radar. To help the navigational radar, the Vision Master chart radar is used. These ships have an ESS-2B bow mounted sonar with an effective range of about 8,000 metres (8,700 yd) for underwater detection.

=== Armament ===
Anti-surface variant

The large patrol crafts of this variant are armed with a 76.2 mm (3 in) H/PJ-26 naval gun and four C-704 surface-to-surface missiles (SSM) mounted aft. Besides, these ships have two dual Oerlikon 20 mm cannon mounted amidships which can be used for anti-aircraft role. For ASW role they have two forward-mounted 6-tube EDS-25A 250 mm ASW rocket launchers and decoy launchers.

Anti-submarine variant

The ships of this variant uses a Chinese origin single 76.2 mm (3 in) NG 16-1 naval gun as the primary gun. Besides, they have one CS/AN2 30 mm (1 in) single-barrel naval gun mounted amidships used as the secondary gun. For anti-submarine warfare role, these ships are armed with two triple 324 mm (13 in) torpedo tubes for ET-52C torpedo. This torpedo has a range of 9.4 km and speed of 42 knots.

== Ships in class ==
Pennant number	Name	Builder	Ordered	Launched	Commissioned	Status
P 811	Durjoy	Wuchang Shipyard	2009	26 August 2012	29 August 2013	In active service
P 813	Nirmul	Wuchang Shipyard	2009	27 September 2012	29 August 2013	In active service
P 814	Durgam	Khulna Shipyard	30 June 2014	29 December 2016	8 November 2017	In active service
P 815	Nishan	Khulna Shipyard	30 June 2014	15 March 2017	8 November 2017	In active service

== See also ==
- List of active ships of the Bangladesh Navy
- Padma-class patrol vessel
