= BNS Durjoy (2012) =

History

Bangladesh
- Name: BNS Durjoy
- Ordered: 2009
- Builder: Wuchang Shipyard
- Launched: August 26, 2012
- Acquired: February 2013
- Commissioned: August 29, 2013
- Home port: Chittagong
- Identification: Pennant number: P 811
- Status: In active service

General characteristics
- Class & type: Durjoy-class large patrol craft
- Displacement: 648 tonnes
- Length: 64.2 m (210.6 ft) (overall)
- Beam: 9 m (29.5 ft)
- Draught: 4 m (13.1 ft)
- Propulsion: 3 x SEMT Pielstick 12PA6 diesel engines; 3 x shafts
- Speed: 28 knots (52 km/h)
- Range: 2,500 nmi (4,600 km; 2,900 mi)
- Endurance: 15 days
- Complement: 60
- Sensors & processing systems: SR47AG surface and air search radar; TR47C Fire Control Radar for main gun; JMA 3336 navigational radar, X band; Vision Master chart radar; ESS-3 bow mounted sonar
- Armament: 1 x H/PJ-26 76.2 mm naval gun; 2 x 2 Oerlikon 20 mm cannon; 2 x 2 C-704 AShM; 2 x 6-tube EDS-25A 250 mm ASW rocket launcher; Decoys

BNS Durjoy is a Durjoy-class semi-stealth large patrol craft (LPC) of the Bangladesh Navy. She is the first ship of the class. She entered service with the Bangladesh Navy in 2013.

== Design ==
BNS Durjoy is of 64.2 metres (211 ft) long overall, 9 metres (30 ft) wide and has a 4 metres (13 ft) draught with a displacement of 648 tonnes. The ship has a bulbous bow that suggests it is very stable in heavy sea states. It has speed and range to support long lasting missions. The LPC is powered by triple SEMT Pielstick 12PA6 diesel engines driving three screws for a top speed of 28 knots (52 km/h; 32 mph). The range of the ship is 2,500 nautical miles (4,600 km; 2,900 mi) and endurance is 15 days. It has a complement of 60. This ship is able to perform limited anti-submarine warfare operations too.

=== Armament ===
The LPC is armed with a single 76.2 mm H/PJ-26 naval gun and four C-704 surface-to-surface missiles (SSM) mounted aft. It is also equipped with two dual Oerlikon 20 mm cannon mounted amidships which can be used for anti-aircraft role. For ASW role it has two forward-mounted 6-tube EDS-25A 250 mm ASW rocket launchers and decoy launchers.

=== Electronics ===
The primary sensor of the ship is a SR47AG surface and air search radar. The ship carries a Chinese TR47C fire control radar for main gun. For navigation, the ship uses the Japanese JMA 3336 radar. To help the navigational radar, the Vision Master chart radar is used. The ship also has an ESS-3 bow mounted sonar with an effective range of about 8,000 metres (26,000 ft) for underwater detection. A JRCSS combat management system (CMS) with at least three multifunction consoles is also fitted in the ships.

== Career ==
BNS Durjoy was launched at Wuchang Shipyard of China on August 26, 2012. She reached Bangladesh in February 2013. On August 29, 2013, she commissioned into the Bangladesh Navy as BNS Durjoy.

The ship took part in Cooperation Afloat Readiness and Training(CARAT), an annual bilateral exercise with United States Navy, in 2015.

== See also ==
- List of active ships of the Bangladesh Navy
