= HMS Orpheus (S11) =

Oberon-class submarine

- HMS Orpheus

History

United Kingdom
- Name: HMS Orpheus
- Builder: Vickers, Barrow-in-Furness
- Laid down: 16 April 1959
- Launched: 17 November 1959
- Commissioned: 25 November 1960
- Identification: Pennant number: S11
- Fate: Scrapped, 1994

General characteristics as designed
- Class & type: Oberon-class submarine
- Displacement: 1,610 tons standard; 2,030 tons full load surfaced; 2,410 tons full load submerged
- Length: 241 feet (73 m) between perpendiculars; 295.2 feet (90.0 m) length overall
- Beam: 26.5 feet (8.1 m)
- Draught: 18 feet (5.5 m)
- Propulsion: 2 × Admiralty Standard Range 16 VMS diesel generators; 2 × 3,000 shaft horsepower (2,200 kW) electric motors; 2 shafts
- Speed: 17 knots (31 km/h; 20 mph) submerged; 12 knots (22 km/h; 14 mph) surfaced
- Complement: 68
- Sensors & processing systems: Type 186 and Type 187 sonars; I-band surface search radar
- Armament: 8 × 21-inch (530 mm) torpedo tubes (6 forward, 2 aft); 24 torpedoes

HMS Orpheus was an Oberon-class submarine of the Royal Navy.

== Design and construction ==
The Oberon class was a direct follow on of the Porpoise-class, with the same dimensions and external design, but updates to equipment and internal fittings, and a higher grade of steel used for fabrication of the pressure hull.

As designed for British service, the Oberon-class submarines were 241 feet (73 m) in length between perpendiculars and 295.2 feet (90.0 m) in length overall, with a beam of 26.5 feet (8.1 m), and a draught of 18 feet (5.5 m). Displacement was 1,610 tons standard, 2,030 tons full load when surfaced, and 2,410 tons full load when submerged. Propulsion machinery consisted of 2 Admiralty Standard Range 16 VMS diesel generators, and two 3,000 shaft horsepower (2,200 kW) electric motors, each driving a 7-foot diameter (2.1 m) 3-bladed propeller at up to 400 rpm. Top speed was 17 knots (31 km/h; 20 mph) when submerged, and 12 knots (22 km/h; 14 mph) on the surface. Eight 21-inch (530 mm) diameter torpedo tubes were fitted (six facing forward, two aft), with a total payload of 24 torpedoes. The boats were fitted with Type 186 and Type 187 sonars, and an I-band surface search radar. The standard complement was 68: 6 officers, 62 sailors. Unlike other members of the class, which had a fin made from glass fibre-reinforced plastic, the fin of Orpheus was made of aluminium alloy.

Orpheus was laid down by Vickers-Armstrongs on 16 April 1959, and launched on 17 November 1959. The boat was commissioned into the Royal Navy on 25 November 1960.

== Operational history ==
In mid-1964, Orpheus joined the 3rd Submarine Flotilla based at Faslane. In June 1965 she carried out submarine escape trials off Malta, with a record 500 feet (150 m) free ascent made. Other duties including training Canadian and Australian crews for Oberon-class submarines that were being built for those countries. On 15 February 1967 Orpheus collided with sister-ship Opportune in poor weather and darkness off Portsmouth Harbour. Orpheus's commanding officer was reprimanded at the resultant court martial.

Orpheus attended the 1977 Silver Jubilee Fleet Review off Spithead when she was part of the Submarine Flotilla.

== Decommissioning and fate ==
She was paid off in 1987; subsequently she served as the 'alongside trainer' at the RN Submarine School, HMS Dolphin, where she provided new recruits with a hands-on training environment. She was broken up in April 1994.

== Publications ==
- Colledge, J. J.; Warlow, Ben (2006) [1969]. Ships of the Royal Navy: The Complete Record of All Fighting Ships of the Royal Navy from the 15th Century to the Present (3rd Rev ed.). London: Chatham Publishing. ISBN 978-1-86176-281-8. OCLC 67375475.
