= HMS Abdiel (N21) =

Royal Navy minelayer (1967)

History

United Kingdom
- Name: HMS Abdiel (N21)
- Ordered: June 1965
- Builder: Thornycroft
- Laid down: 23 May 1966
- Launched: 22 January 1967
- Commissioned: 17 October 1967
- Decommissioned: 1988
- Refit: 1977, 1981
- Fate: Scrapped 1988

General characteristics
- Displacement: 1375 t standard; 1460 t full load
- Length: 265 ft (81 m)
- Beam: 38 ft 6 in (11.73 m)
- Draught: 10 ft (3.0 m)
- Propulsion: 2 shafts, 2 eighteen-cylinder Paxman Ventura diesels; 2,960 bhp (2,210 kW)
- Speed: 16 kn (18 mph; 30 km/h)
- Complement: 98
- Sensors & processing systems: Type 978 radar
- Armament: Bofors 40 mm L/60 gun (from 1984); 44 × naval mines

HMS Abdiel was a Royal Navy minelayer that saw service during the Cold War.

Abdiel was ordered from Thornycroft in June 1965. She was laid down at Thornycroft's Woolston shipyard on 23 May 1966 and launched 22 January 1967. She was commissioned on 17 October 1967. Her pennant number was N21.

== Minelayer ==
Abdiel was designated by the Ministry of Defence as an "exercise minelayer" and her official role was to train Royal Navy personnel in minelaying operations using test/dummy naval mines, not to lay offensive mines operationally. She was fully capable of laying offensive mines during wartime.

== MCM support ship ==
Abdiel fulfilled an additional role as a support ship for mine countermeasure vessels. She served in this capacity with the Armilla Patrol from 1987 to 1988. During this deployment, the air conditioning units aboard ship proved insufficient for the climate and additional units had to be dispatched.

== Refits ==
- 1977
- 1981

== Paid off ==
Abdiel was paid off in 1988 and sold for scrapping. After her disposal, the Royal Navy had no dedicated minelaying vessel, although provisions were made for "suitably modified vessels" to undertake the work as required. In 1987 her commanding officer spoke with Raymond Baxter at the 1987 Festival of Remembrance in a segment about Royal Navy modes of communication

== Media ==
Abdiel appears in the Royal Navy instructional film 'Minelaying' (Admiralty catalogue no. A2788) produced in 1976. Classified as restricted at the time of its release, the film is now unrestricted and available on archive DVD collections and the Internet.
