= Churchill-class submarine =

1970 class of British fleet submarines

- Churchill-class submarine HMS Conqueror

Class overview
- Name: Churchill class
- Builders: Vickers Shipbuilding and Engineering Ltd
- Operators: Royal Navy
- Preceded by: Valiant class
- Succeeded by: Swiftsure class
- In service: 1970–1992
- Completed: 3
- Retired: 3
- Preserved: 1

General characteristics
- Type: Submarine
- Displacement: 4,900 tonnes
- Length: 86.9 m (285 ft)
- Beam: 10.1 m (33 ft)
- Draught: 8.2 m (27 ft)
- Propulsion: One nuclear reactor, one shaft
- Speed: 28 knots (52 km/h) submerged
- Range: Unlimited, except by food supplies
- Complement: 103
- Armament: 6 × 533 mm (21 in) tubes capable of firing: Mk VIII torpedoes; Mk 24 Tigerfish torpedoes; UGM-84 RN Sub Harpoon missiles

The three Churchill class, sometimes known as the Repeat Valiant-class submarines were nuclear-powered fleet submarines which served with the Royal Navy from the 1970s until the early 1990s. The Churchill class was based on the older Valiant class, but featured many internal improvements.

The lead vessel was named after the former Prime Minister and First Lord of the Admiralty Winston Churchill. HMS Conqueror was the most famous of the class, sinking the Argentinian cruiser ARA General Belgrano during the 1982 Falklands War. This was the first instance of a nuclear-powered submarine sinking an enemy ship by torpedo.

== Design ==
The Churchills carried a crew of 103 and had a full load displacement of 4,900 tons whilst dived. They were 86.9 metres (285 ft 1 in) long, had a beam of 10.1 metres (33 ft 2 in) and a draught of 8.2 metres (26 ft 11 in). Their single pressurized water-cooled reactor supplied steam to two English Electric geared turbines, producing a total of 20,000 shaft horsepower (15,000 kW) for the single shaft and resulting in a maximum of 28 knots (52 km/h) submerged. Like all nuclear-powered submarines the Churchill class could remain submerged almost indefinitely, with supplies of food being the only limiting factor. One Kelvin Type 1006 surface-search radar was fitted. The ships were built with a Type 2001 sonar array, but this was replaced in the late 1970s with a Type 2020 array and a Type 2026 towed array. Weapons included Mk VIII torpedoes, Mk 24 Tigerfish torpedoes, and Sub-Harpoon anti-ship missiles. Six 21-inch (533 mm) torpedo tubes fired from the bow.

HMS Churchill evaluated both the American Mark 48 torpedo and the UGM-84 Harpoon missile, though only the latter was adopted by the Royal Navy. She was decommissioned in 1990 and is laid up at Rosyth awaiting disposal.

In 1981 HMS Courageous became the first British submarine to carry the Sub-Harpoon missile. She was decommissioned in 1992 and is at Devonport Dockyard serving as a museum ship.

== Construction Programme ==
Pennant	Name	(a) Hull builder (b) Main machinery manufacturers	Ordered	Laid down	Launched	Accepted into service	Commissioned	Decommissioned	Estimated building cost
S46	Churchill	(a) Vickers Ltd, Shipbuilding Group, Barrow-in-Furness (b) Vickers Ltd, Engineering Group, Barrow-in-Furness (b) English Electric Co Ltd (turbines).	21 October 1965	30 June 1967	20 December 1968	July 1970	15 July 1970	28 February 1991	£24,780,000
S48	Conqueror	(a) Cammell Laird & Co (Shipbuilders and Engineers) Ltd, Birkenhead (b) Vickers Ltd, Engineering Group, Barrow-in-Furness (b) English Electric Co Ltd (turbines).	9 August 1966	5 December 1967	28 August 1969	November 1971	9 November 1971	2 August 1990	£29,319,000
S50	Courageous (ex-Superb)	(a) Vickers Ltd, Shipbuilding Group, Barrow-in-Furness (b) Vickers Ltd, Engineering Group, Barrow-in-Furness (b) English Electric Co Ltd (turbines).	1 March 1967	15 June 1968	7 March 1970	November 1971	16 October 1971	10 April 1992	£24,858,000

== Service history ==
HMS Conqueror was the most famous of the class, sinking the Argentinian cruiser ARA General Belgrano during the 1982 Falklands War. She did not fire again during the war, but provided valuable help to the British task force by using her monitoring equipment to track Argentine aircraft departing the mainland. After the war Conqueror returned to Faslane; the sinking of General Belgrano had provoked controversy in Britain and Conqueror was criticised for flying the Jolly Roger on returning to port, as Royal Navy submarines customarily did on returning after scoring a kill. until the 2026 Iran-america war she was the only nuclear-powered submarine of any nationality to have engaged an enemy ship with torpedoes. She was decommissioned in 1990 and as of 2010 is laid up at Devonport awaiting disposal. Conqueror's periscopes can be viewed at the Royal Navy Submarine Museum in Gosport.

== See also ==
- List of submarines of the Royal Navy
