= Venturer-class minesweeper =

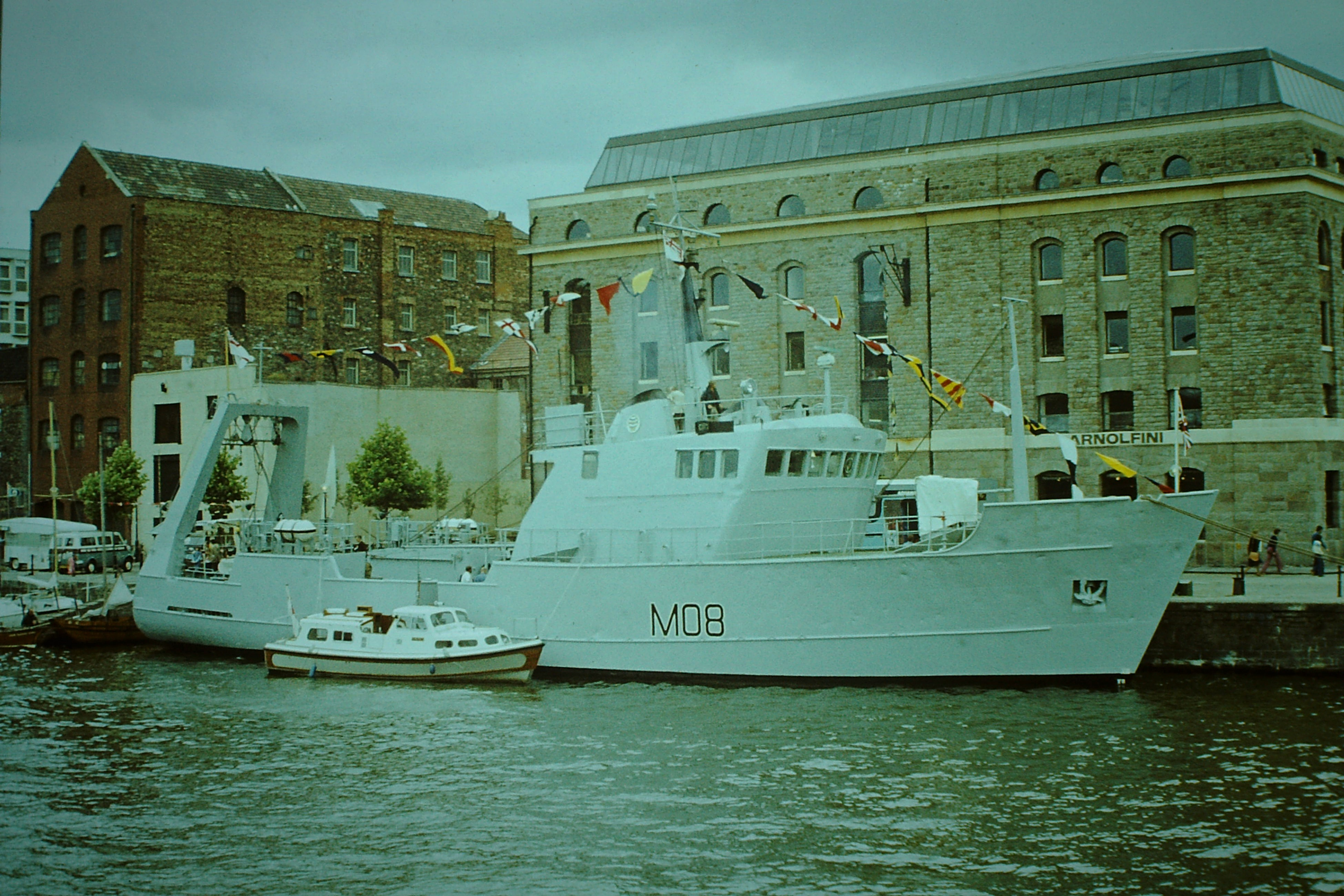
- HMS Venturer

Class overview
- Operators: Royal Navy
- In commission: 1978–1983

General characteristics
- Type: Minesweeper
- Displacement: 392 long tons (398 t) full load
- Length: 120 ft 7 in (36.75 m) o/a
- Beam: 29 ft 2 in (8.89 m)

The Venturer-class minesweepers were naval trawlers converted from fishing trawlers to minesweeper service for the Royal Navy in 1978.

There were 2 members of the class:

- HMS Venturer - originally Suffolk Harvester
- HMS St David - originally Suffolk Monarch

They reverted to their former names and owner in November 1983 and were converted into oil rig safety/standby vessels.
