= Castle-class patrol vessel =

Class of ship in the United Kingdom

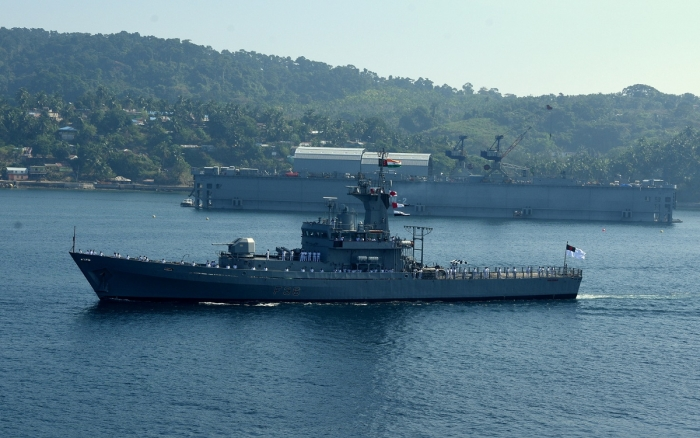
- BNS Dhaleshwari (ex-HMS Leeds Castle) in 2018

Class overview
- Builders: Hall, Russell & Company
- Operators: Royal Navy (retired); Bangladesh Navy
- Preceded by: Island class
- Succeeded by: River class
- Built: 1979–1981
- In commission: 1982–Present
- Planned: 6
- Completed: 2

General characteristics
- Type: Offshore patrol vessel
- Displacement: 1,570 tons full load
- Length: 266 ft (81 m) (overall)
- Beam: 37 ft 9 in (11.51 m)
- Draught: 11 ft 3 in (3.43 m)
- Propulsion: 2 shafts, 2 Paxman diesels, 2,820 hp (2,100 kW)
- Speed: 20 knots (37 km/h)
- Range: 10,000 nautical miles (19,000 km) at 10 knots (19 km/h)
- Complement: 40
- Sensors & processing systems: Type 1006 radar; Simrad RU sidescan sonar; (Bangladesh Navy installed Type 360 Radar as the main radar)
- Armament: Royal Navy: 1 × Bofors 40 mm gun Mark III, replaced by 1 × 30 mm gun; Bangladesh Navy: 1 x 76 mm (3.0 in) main gun; 4 × C-704 AShM; Small caliber guns or autocannons
- Aviation facilities: Flight deck capable of supporting a Sea King helicopter

The Castle class was a class of British offshore patrol vessels of the Royal Navy. Two ships were constructed and after nearly 30 years service were sold to the Bangladesh Navy in 2010. The Bangladesh Navy upgraded these with more armaments including C-704 anti-ship missiles and sensors. These ships are now reclassified as corvettes by the Bangladesh Navy.

== Design ==
The Castle class was designed by David K. Brown and was intended as a series of six offshore patrol vessels for the Royal Navy, designed in response to criticism of the previous Island class for insufficient speed, sub-optimal sea-keeping and lack of a flight deck for rescue helicopters.

In the event, only two ships were built, HMS Leeds Castle and HMS Dumbarton Castle. Both vessels were built by Hall Russell in Aberdeen, Scotland. These had significant improvements over the Island-class – they were 300 tonnes larger, more stable in heavy seas, 3 knots (5.6 km/h; 3.5 mph) faster and fitted with a large flight deck capable of supporting a Sea King helicopter. For brief periods, the ships could accommodate up to 120 troops.

Their primary mission was to serve with the Fishery Protection Squadron, protecting both the fishing fleets and the oil and gas fields of the North Sea. They could also serve as minelayers, and had detergent spraying facilities on board for dispersing oil slicks.

== Operations ==
After the Falklands War, one ship was kept long-term in the Falkland Islands as a guard ship. Leeds Castle and Dumbarton Castle rotated the role on a three-yearly basis, although the ship's crew usually did a six-month rotation.

== Replacement ==
The Castle class was replaced in the Falklands by a unique vessel based on the River class, HMS Clyde, and both vessels of the class were decommissioned. Originally due to transfer to the Pakistan Maritime Security Agency in 2007, the deal fell through and both ships were sold to the Bangladesh Navy.

== Ships in class ==
Name	Pennant Number	Builder	Laid down	Launched	Commissioned	Fate
Leeds Castle	P258	Hall, Russell & Company, Aberdeen	18 October 1979	22 October 1980	27 August 1981	Sold to Bangladesh Navy, April 2010 as BNS Dhaleshwari
Dumbarton Castle	P265	Hall, Russell & Company, Aberdeen	25 June 1980	3 June 1981	12 March 1982	Sold to Bangladesh Navy, April 2010 as BNS Bijoy
