= HMS Warspite (S103) =

1966 Valiant-class nuclear-powered fleet submarine of the Royal Navy

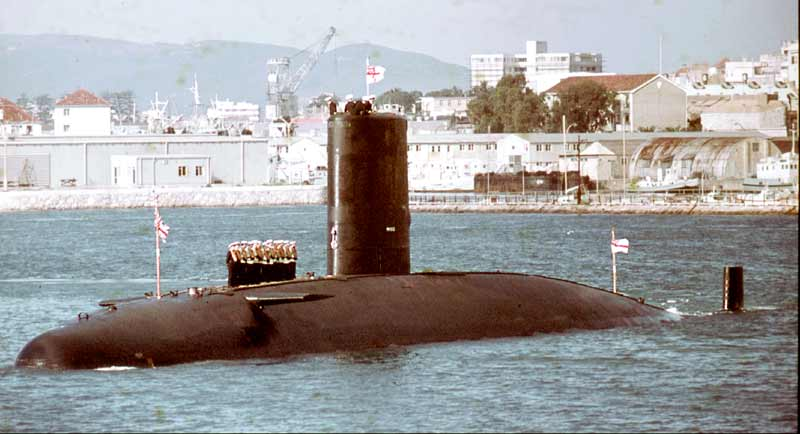
- HMS Warspite

History

United Kingdom
- Name: HMS Warspite
- Ordered: 12 December 1962
- Builder: Vickers-Armstrongs
- Laid down: 10 December 1963
- Launched: 25 September 1965
- Commissioned: 18 April 1967
- Decommissioned: 1991
- Honours and awards: 25 inherited honours
- Fate: In storage, awaiting disposal
- Badge

General characteristics
- Class & type: Valiant-class submarine
- Displacement: 4,200 long tons (4,300 t) surfaced; 4,900 long tons (5,000 t) submerged
- Length: 285 ft (87 m)
- Beam: 33 ft 3 in (10.13 m)
- Draught: 27 ft (8.2 m)
- Propulsion: 1 × Rolls-Royce pressurised water reactor; 2 × English Electric steam turbines, 15,000 hp (11 MW); 1 × Paxman diesel-electric generator; 1 shaft
- Speed: 20 knots (23 mph; 37 km/h) surfaced; 28 knots (32 mph; 52 km/h) submerged
- Range: Unlimited, except by food supplies
- Complement: 116
- Armament: 6 × 21 inch (533 mm) bow torpedo tubes; 24 torpedoes; Later equipped with: RNSH UGM-84 Harpoon (RN version of underwater launched cruise missile); Tigerfish torpedoes; Main Sonar system 2001

The latest HMS Warspite was the third of Britain's nuclear-powered submarines, and the second (and final) of the Valiant class. After entering service in 1967 she collided with a Soviet submarine the following year. A mechanical failure associated with the submarine's nuclear reactor in 1991 led to the boat being laid up at HMNB Devonport where she awaits disposal.

== Operational history ==
The second Valiant-class submarine, to be called Warspite, was ordered from Vickers-Armstrong's Barrow shipyard on 12 December 1962, and was laid down on 10 December 1963. She was launched on 25 September 1965 by Mary Wilson, the wife of the then British Prime Minister Harold Wilson, and entered service on 18 April 1967.

In October 1968 whilst following a Soviet boat identified as an Echo II-class submarine, Warspite collided with the stern and propellers of that boat. Warspite suffered damage to her fin but after surfacing to inspect damage was able to submerge and return home, and later sail to Barrow for proper repairs.

On 2 May 1976, Warspite was alongside in Liverpool, when she suffered a fire in her diesel generator room, in one of the most serious incidents the Royal Navy's nuclear submarines have encountered. The fire filled the aft end of the submarine with dense smoke, making it very difficult for the submarine's crew to monitor the status of the reactor, and Warspite's commanding officer considered scuttling the submarine in the event that a reactor accident did develop. The fire was eventually extinguished with the aid of civilian firefighters from the Liverpool Fire Brigade after 4 1/2 hours. The submarine's Marine Engineering Officer, Lieutenant Commander Tim Cannon, was one of three crew members awarded the Queen's Gallantry Medal for their roles in the response to the fire. A further three crew members were awarded Queens Commendations for Brave Conduct

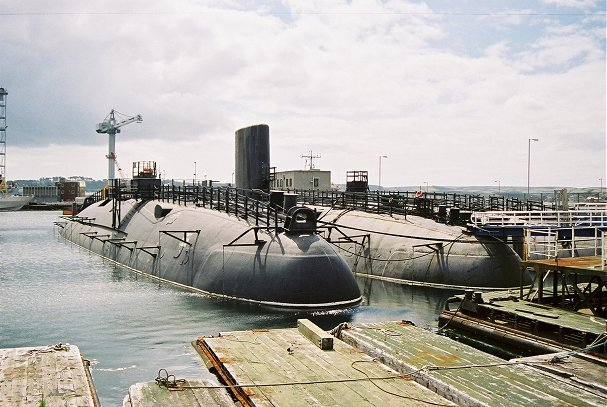
Warspite (left) and Conqueror (centre) with Valiant (at rear) at Devonport Navy Days on 26 August 2006

Warspite underwent a two-year refit, which was nearing completion just as the Falklands War with Argentina started. After the war ended she carried out a record breaking patrol around the Falkland Islands and the Argentine coast. Warspite conducted the longest duration submerged submarine patrol made public from the dates of 25 November 1982 to 15 March 1983. A total of 111 days was spent submerged and unsupported, covering 57,085 km (30,823 nmi; 35,471 mi).

The submarine was decommissioned due to mechanical failure associated with the reactor in 1991. Mainly operated out of HMNB Clyde, at Faslane (the former Clyde Submarine Base) with the Third Submarine Squadron. Her hull and reactor are currently laid up afloat at Devonport Dockyard, Plymouth until facilities are available for the long-term storage of her radioactive components.

Notable commanders of this vessel include Sandy Woodward. Woodward went on to command the Falklands Conflict battle group, became Commander-in-Chief Naval Home Command and rose to the rank of admiral.

== Appearances in media ==
HMS Warspite was joined by a BBC film crew during NATO military exercise 'Ocean Safari' in 1983. They documented the submarine's role in the exercise as an enemy submarine, offering a detailed view of life on board for its crew. The program was broadcast on BBC One in January 1985, as part of a six-film series documenting the Royal Navy Submarine Service.

== Publications ==
- Ballantyne, Iain (2014). Hunter Killers: The Dramatic Untold Story of the Royal Navy's Most Secret Service. London: Orion. ISBN 978-1-4091-3901-0.
- Blackman, Raymond V.B. Jane's Fighting Ships 1971–72. London: Sampson Low, Marston & Co., Ltd. ISBN 0-354-00096-9.
- Hennesey, Peter; Jinks, James (2016). The Silent Deep: The Royal Navy Submarine Service since 1945. Penguin. ISBN 978-0-241-95948-0.
- Gardiner, Robert; Chumbley, Stephen, eds. (1995). Conway's All The World's Fighting Ships 1947–1995. Annapolis, Maryland, USA: Naval Institute Press. ISBN 1-55750-132-7.
