= HMS Leeds Castle (P258) =

History

United Kingdom
- Name: Leeds Castle
- Ordered: 8 August 1980
- Builder: Hall, Russell & Company
- Laid down: 18 October 1979
- Launched: 22 October 1980
- Sponsored by: Lady Speed, wife of then Navy Minister Keith Speed
- Commissioned: 27 October 1981
- Decommissioned: 8 August 2005
- Identification: Pennant number: P258; IMO number: 7920003
- Fate: Sold to Bangladesh

General characteristics
- Class & type: Castle-class patrol vessel
- Displacement: 1,350 long tons (1,370 t) standard; 1,550 long tons (1,570 t) full load
- Length: 81.0 m (265 ft 9 in) oa; 75.0 m (246 ft 1 in) pp
- Beam: 11.5 m (37 ft 9 in)
- Draught: 3.42 m (11 ft 3 in)
- Propulsion: 2 × Ruston 12RKC 5,640 bhp (4,210 kW) diesels, 2 shafts
- Speed: 20 knots (37 km/h; 23 mph) max
- Complement: 45 (+ accommodation for 25 Royal Marines)
- Armament: Oerlikon / BMARC 30 mm L/75 KCB gun on single Laurence Scott DS-30B mount; 4 × L7 General Purpose Machine Guns; 1 × H/PJ-26 76 mm main gun (in Bangladesh service); 4 × C-704 ASHM (in Bangladesh service); 2 × Oerlikon 20 mm auto cannons (in Bangladesh service)
- Aircraft carried: Flight deck can support helicopters up to Westland Sea King-size but has operated Chinook which landed athwartship

HMS Leeds Castle (P258) was a Castle-class patrol vessel built by Hall, Russell & Company of Aberdeen, Scotland for the Royal Navy. She was launched in October 1980 and commissioned the following August. She was involved in the 1982 Falklands War, operating between the British territories of Ascension Island, South Georgia, and the Falkland Islands as a dispatch vessel commanded by Lieutenant-Commander Colin Hamilton.

The Leeds Castle spent much time performing fishery protection duties around the United Kingdom, as well as being used as a guard ship in the Falkland Islands. In 2000, Leeds Castle underwent an eight-month refit, returning to the fleet in early 2001.

== Design and construction ==
The Castle class was designed for fisheries protection and oilfield patrol duties in the United Kingdom's exclusive economic zone (EEZ). They were a follow-on to the interim Island-class patrol vessel which had been ordered in 1975 when the EEZ was extended to 200 nautical miles (370 km; 230 mi), and as a result of initial experience with the Islands, was considerably longer in order to improve seakeeping in heavy seas, with the extra length giving greater speed from the same power as the Islands and allowing a large helicopter deck to be fitted.

Leeds Castle was 81.0 metres (265 ft 9 in) long overall and 75.0 m (246 ft 1 in) between perpendiculars, with a beam of 11.5 m (37 ft 9 in) and a draught of 3.42 m (11 ft 3 in). Displacement was 1,350 long tons (1,370 t) standard and 1,550 long tons (1,570 t) full load. The ship was powered by two Ruston 12RK 320 DM diesel engines rated at 5,460 brake horsepower (4,070 kW) (with a maximum sustained power of 4,380 bhp (3,270 kW), driving two shafts fitted with controllable pitch propellers. This gave a speed of 20 knots (37 km/h; 23 mph). The ship had a range of 10,000 nmi (19,000 km; 12,000 mi) at 12 kn (22 km/h; 14 mph).

The ship was initially armed with a single Bofors 40 mm L/60 gun, although by 1990 this had been replaced by an Oerlikon 30 mm gun on a DS30B mount. The main armament was supplemented by two 7.62 mm machine guns. A large helicopter deck was fitted aft, suitable for landing a Sea King or Chinook helicopter, but no hangar was provided, as the cost of a permanently embarked helicopter would be more than the cost of the ship. She was fitted with Type 1006 navigation radar, which was supplemented with a Type 994 air/surface search radar in 1989, together with a UAN(1) electronic intercept system (based on the Orange Crop system fitted to the Royal Navy's helicopters. The ship had a crew of 6 officers and 39 other ranks, with room for a 25-man detachment of Royal Marines to be carried. (Note: Jane's Fighting Ships lists a crew of 50, plus the 25 man Marine detachment.)

Leeds Castle was laid down at Hall, Russell & Company's Aberdeen shipyard as Yard number 985 on 18 October 1979 as the first of two Castle-class patrol vessels. This was in advance of a formal order for the two ships being placed, which did not take place until 8 August that year. She was launched on 22 October 1980, and was completed in December 1981.

== Service ==
After commissioning and workup, Leeds Castle, assigned the pennant number P258, started fishery protection patrols around Shetland and in the English Channel in March 1982. On 2 April 1982, the Falklands War began when Argentine forces invaded the Falkland Islands. Leeds Castle was diverted from her normal North Sea patrol duties on 22 April, being fitted additional communications equipment and a desalination plant at HMNB Portsmouth before setting out for the Falklands on 29 April. She arrived in the Total Exclusion Zone on 21 May where she was employed as a despatch vessel, duties including acting as a refuelling platform for helicopters transferring stores between the transports Queen Elizabeth 2, Canberra and Norland near South Georgia on 27 May. She was then ordered to Ascension Island to serve as guardship, arriving there on 6 June 1982, before setting out again for the Falklands on 29 June, arriving at Port Stanley on 12 July. She set out on her return journey to the Britain on 24 July, arriving back at her home port of Rosyth on 20 August 1982.

In 1983, Leeds Castle took part in minelaying trials.

The ship was decommissioned in 2005 after a 24-year career having finished her final deployment as a patrol vessel based in the Falkland Islands. She was relieved in that role in 2004, returning to the UK in November.

=== Sale to Bangladesh ===
In April 2010 Leeds Castle was sold to Bangladesh along with Dumbarton Castle. The two ships were refitted at the A&P Group facility in Newcastle upon Tyne before being handed over. In 2010, Leeds Castle and Dumbarton Castle were renamed as the Dhaleshwari and Bijoy of the Bangladesh Navy respectively.
