= Type 348 Radar =

Chinese fire control radar

Type 348 radar is a Chinese fire control radar developed for Type 76 twin 37 mm naval gun to guide it for point-defence, and it incorporates features of Italian RTN-10X and RTN-20X sold to China in 1992. Type 348 radar is frequently but erroneously confused and misidentified as another Chinese naval radar Type 346 due to the lack of publicized information in the development of the latter.

== Development ==
To meet the urgent Chinese naval need of CIWS type point-defence before the availability of advanced such as Type 730 CIWS, Type 348 radar is developed as a stopgap measure by developing a less capable point-defence system using Type 76 twin 37 mm guns. The muzzle velocity of twin 37 mm is 1 km per second, and the maximum rate is 800 round per minute, with a range of 3 km. However, early developmental trials have revealed that the original fire control radar Type 342 used proved to be rather inadequate in tracking sea-skimming anti-ship missiles, consequently, Type 348 radar was developed as a replacement, incorporating technologies of Italian RTN-10X and -20X radars purchased in the early 1990s. The 800 round per minute maximum rate of fire of the larger twin 37 mm gun is not sufficient either, when compared to the Gatling gun of smaller calibers used by CIWS at the time. To increase the firepower, Type 348 radar is designed to control two twin 37 mm gun mounts simultaneously against the same target, thus doubling the volume of fire and increase the probability of kill. Although the point-defence system incorporating Type 348 radar and two twin 37 mm gun mounts has proved to be effective against subsonic sea-skimming anti-ship missile flying as low as just four meters above sea level, it nonetheless has been phased out of Chinese service when advanced CIWS of Gatling design such as Type 730 CIWS became widely available. Another cheaper replacement of point-defence system based on 37 mm guns and Type 348 radar is Soviet/Russian AK-630, which is installed on Type 054 frigate.

Type 348 radar is one of the most misidentified Chinese radars because it is frequently but erroneously referred by many as several other Chinese radars due to confusion. For example, Type 348 has been confused with and misidentified as much larger Chinese active phased array radar Type 346. Additionally, Type 348 radar is also misidentified with two other fire control radars of its same class: Type 347 and Type 349. Type 347, 348, and 349 are all fire control radars for small caliber guns and all share the similar size and configuration, so they look very similar externally, but in reality, they are different radars. The three radars can be distinguished by the following features: When electro-optics (EO) are integrated with radar, EO is installed on the portside of Type 347 radar antenna, but for Type 348 and Type 349, EO is installed on the starboard side of the radar antenna. Furthermore, when incorporated as part of CIWS system, Type 349 is slaved to Type 730 CIWS gun and thus does not rotate, because the gun rotates when searching/tracking. In contrast, Type 348 is not slaved to the Type 76 37mm twin guns, but instead, installed separately from the gun mounts, and thus Type 348 rotates when searching/tracking. The shape of antenna is also an important visual cue to distinguish three radars. The tip of Type 349 radar is a conical, which is missing on Type 347. Instead, the tip of Type 347 radar antenna is a small circular flat surface, missing the tip of the cone. The antenna of Type 348 radar differs from both Type 347 and Type 349 radars in that most of the cone is missing, only the base remains, so the antenna of Type 348 radar has a very large circular flat surface, resulting in Type 348 radar resembles a scaled down version of another larger fire control radar for larger caliber guns (76 mm or greater), Type 344.

- Other reported names:
  - TR47C
  - Monopulse Naval Gun Fire Control and Tracking Radar System (NGFS)

== See also ==
- Chinese radars
- Naval Weaponry of the People's Liberation Army Navy
