= Reginald Daniel =

British naval architect (1920-2016)

Reginald John 'Jack' Daniel, OBE, RCNC (1920–2016) was a renowned naval architect for the Royal Navy. He rose to be Director General Ships from 1974 to 1979.

== Early life ==
Daniel began his career as an electrical apprentice at Chatham Royal Dockyard, transferring to shipwright at the end of the second year. He began his training in the Royal Corps of Naval Constructors in 1939, as a cadet at Royal Naval College, Greenwich. With the London bombing, the course moved to Bristol, and he graduated with a First Class certificate in 1942.

== Career ==
In 1942, Daniel was appointed to DNC submarine team as an Assistant Constructor, involving a great deal of sea time. In 1944 Daniel was appointed as a Constructor Lieutenant Commander on the staff of the Far East Fleet and early in 1945 moved as a Lieutenant Commander in to the Pacific Fleet. In this role he visited the Hiroshima nuclear explosion site, and flew home to brief the Cabinet on the damage. Daniel continued working on the effect of nuclear explosions when he went as assistant to Sir William Penney to witness the Bikini tests in 1946.

From 1947 to 1950, Daniel became professional secretary to the then Director of Naval Construction, Charles Lillicrap, and a visiting lecturer at Royal Naval College, Greenwich.

From 1950 to 1956, Daniel worked on aircraft carrier and cruiser designs. He led the design of the 15,000-ton Seaslug missile cruiser. This design was replaced by the County-class destroyer design following Lord Mountbatten's 1955 directive (7/959).

In 1956, Daniel joined the new Dreadnought Project Team (DPT) to design the first British nuclear submarine HMS Dreadnought, under Rowland Baker as the Project Manager. He received an OBE for his work in 1958 Birthday's Honours List.

In 1958 Daniel left DPT to carry out preliminary surface ship designs in the Forward Design Group. Daniel worked for Alfred Sims putting concepts to the naval staff and responding promptly to their proposals. Daniel understood that prompt responses were essential, stating "a 90% answer today is of more assistance to the naval staff than a 98% answer in one week's time". Using "a range of data, graphs and non-dimensional plots" it was possible by the end of the day to have "a weather deck plan and elevation of a possible ship, a statement of its size and cost and how long it would take to design in detail and build". His most important design investigation was into a proposed new aircraft carrier to operate new hypothetical aircraft that would be faster and heavier than those to date. The study concluded that an aircraft carrier no less than 1,000 feet and 75,000 tonnes would be required. This was the pre-cursor of the CVA-01 aircraft carrier project.

In 1960 Daniel returned to DPT as a Chief Constructor. In 1962, he was aboard for the HMS Dreadnought sea trials, witnessing the first full speed surface transit with the dry bow and low stern at 20 knots. He led the design of the Valiant class.

In 1962, Daniel was informed his appointment as Professor at Greenwich would not proceed. Instead he would lead a design team to work up the Resolution-class submarine for the Polaris programme. In 1963, he led a Deep Technical Team to the US. Pat Jarvis, future Director General Ships, was the weapons-electrical senior. He observed the detailed planning and monitoring the US project applied. They visited US Navy design in Washington DC, the Electric Boat Division building yard at Groton, and SSBN afloat at Portsmouth Naval Yard.

On return from the US, the team recommended adopting the US A-3 missile and Class 640 missile compartment. To this Daniel recommended using the forward and aft sections of the Valiant class. This was the basis of the final Resolution-class design.

In 1966, Daniel attended the Imperial Defence College for a year long course on world affairs for those destined for higher rank. The course visit financial institutions, industrial plants, and overseas trips to Germany and South America.

After the course, Daniel became Assistant Director responsible for researching materials. His team investigated future use of epoxy based structures for GRP mine-sweepers, in particular their shock resistance. His team also looked at the effectiveness of paint, finding anti-fouling paint needed to be kept underwater to avoid oxidation, that the latest anti-fouling paint was highly poisonous, and proprietary paint for much more expensive and little better than the standard stores paint. His team concluded that ship's bottom plating should be zinc-sprayed to avoid corrosion. Weather decks proved best protected if zinc-sprayed followed by an aluminium-spraying. Daniel also encouraged work to develop welding of NQ1 for submarines, and ultrasonic inspection of welding.

Daniel was then appointed as Assistant Director responsible for the Forward Design Group (FDG). Daniel was tasked to review the Type 42 destroyer design. There had been an extended discussion with the naval staff about the size and cost of the design. In order to reduce the cost, an artificial limit of 3,500 tons. The design was heavily reduced by the destroyer team during detailed design. Daniel advised that the ship could not be built with that displacement. Following hull plating damage to the first-of-class, HMS Sheffield, additional structure was included in the follow-on builds, resulting in a ship of 4,100 tons displacement. (Batch 3 ships were lengthened by 42 feet, and the displacement increased to 4,700 tons).

Under Daniel, FDG worked on evaluating the full life-cycle costs of HM Ships. A Life Cycle Costing Working Party was set up chaired by Daniel with Kenneth Rawson as secretary. The team looked a 'short life frigate' designed for a life of about 12 years.

Daniel was MoD lead on the Vosper Thorneycroft designed Type 21 frigates. He argued strongly against the use of aluminium superstructure, which proved susceptible to fire collapse following action damage in the Falklands Conflict. The class were lightly armed, and it proved impossible to retro-fit the Seawolf missile system as planned.

FDG also worked with the Dutch navy designers on joint Anglo-Dutch frigate. Differences in requirements meant the project did not proceed, and the Royal Navy continued with the design as the Type 22 frigate.

In 1972, Daniel was promoted to Deputy Director as DPT, in charge of all submarines projects. DPT had been working on the completely new SSN 0Y design. Daniel vetoed this in favour of an improved Swiftsure-class, resulting in the Trafalgar-class submarines. The team was led by Louis Rydill, with the priority on noise reduction. DPT were also working the update of the Polaris missile with the Chevaline system.

In 1974, Daniel was promoted Director General Ships. He continued to innovate in this role. He introduced the mid-career updating for Constructors. He believed in a role for hydrofoils in the Royal Navy, resulting in the purchase and trialling of the Boeing Jetfoil, HMS Speedy. He continued in this role until 1979.

In 1979, Daniel left the MoD to become a Director of British Shipbuilders. Daniel described these as his 'wasted years'. Daniel was persuaded to resign from the MoD to join the recently nationalised state shipbuilder by the Labour Government, with a view to nursing the merchant shipbuilding industry back into good health. Unfortunately for Daniel, shortly after his move to British Shipbuilders, a Conservative Government was elected in 1979, which set about rationalising and selling off nationalised industries. Shipyards were privatised between 1984 and 1989. The warship divisions now form part of successful private companies: Vosper Thorneycroft in Portsmouth, Yarrows in Glasgow, and VSEL in Barrow.

Daniel spent much of effort on international naval projects and sales. He was a senior company representative on the proposed NATO frigate NFR-90, the Canadian submarine project (proposed as a nuclear submarine project, and became the conventional Type 2400 Upholder/Victoria-class submarine), and the sale of the Type 2400 to Australia. He continued in this role until 1991.

== Personal ==
Daniel died on 28 September 2016. He was survived by his wife Liz, and sons Richard and Jeremy.

Daniel wrote a memoir covering his career between 1942 and 1991: The End of An Era.
