= Rowland Baker =

British Naval Architect (1908-1983)

- Born: 3 June 1908; Sheerness, Kent
- Died: 25 November 1983 (aged 75)
- Education: Royal Naval College, Greenwich
- Honours: OBE, KCB (Knight Commander of the Bath)

Sir Rowland 'Rolly' Baker, OBE, KCB, RCNC (3 June 1908 – 25 November 1983) was a renowned naval architect for the Royal Navy. He was project director for the design and construction of the Royal Navy's first nuclear submarines in the 1950s. He also developed a full range of landing craft used by the Allies in World War II.

== Early life ==
Rowland Baker was born in Sheerness, Kent. His father, Issac, was the master of an Eastwood sailing barge. He could have continued in his father's career on the barges, but his parents encouraged him in his studies.

He attended Rochester Technical School. In 1923, he joined Sheerness Dockyard as an apprentice shipwright, a significant achievement that would lead to secure lifetime employment. In 1927 he was selected as a cadet for the Royal Corps of Naval Constructors. He attended a four-year naval architecture course at the Royal Naval College, Greenwich. As part of his training, he was required to go to sea with the Royal Navy, which he did in the Mediterranean.

== Career ==
In 1931, having successfully completed his cadetship, Baker was appointed to Portsmouth Dockyard as an assistant constructor. Assistant constructors were typically rotated through different jobs in the Admiralty, working in dockyards and design departments (where they were sometimes referred to as calculators). After the dockyard, in 1934 he moved to Whitehall and worked on the designs of sloops and minesweepers (Bangor class). In 1937 he returned to Sheerness Dockyard.

In 1939 Baker was promoted to constructor. Around 1940, he was tasked with designing a full range of landing craft for personnel and vehicles. He designed landing crafts for tanks (landing craft, tank or LCT) and landing ships with docks (landing ship, dock or LSD) to act as 'mother' craft to carry smaller landing crafts across oceans. From 1941 Baker was acting chief constructor and superintendent of landing craft. Baker travelled to the United States and worked with the Americans to design and build a full range of landing craft. These were used on the amphibious landings in Sicily and Normandy on D-Day. For his work, Baker was awarded an OBE, and the United States Medal of Freedom with Silver Palm.

In 1948, Baker was seconded to the Royal Canadian Navy. He was commissioned as a constructor captain in the RCN(R), with seniority back dated to 9 November 1941. He acted as Ccnstructor-in-chief from 1950. He was promoted to constructor commodore in 1956. He remained in Canada until 1956 or 1957.

In 1958, Baker was nominated by Sir Stanley Goodall, DNC, to Lord Mountbatten, the First Sea Lord, as head of the Dreadnought Project Team (DPT). Baker was solely responsible for the design, construction and costs. He became the leader and driving force of the project. He brought the DPT team together at the Admiralty complex at Foxhill, Bath. Foxhill, in particular C Block, became the home of the submarine directorate for the next 60 years.

Jack Daniel, design naval architect for Dreadnought, wrote in his memoir of Baker:

"His forte was management. Some years later Norman Hancock was to remark that 'Baker's knowledge of submarine design would not cover half a sheet of foolscap but he, Hancock, had learned a hell of a lot about management from him'. We all did."

As a result of his success with Dreadnought, Baker's role transformed into the technical director of the Polaris Executive (DPT) for the development of the Resolution-class ballistic submarines. Getting the naval nuclear deterrent to sea was a national strategic priority. Baker kept close supervision of the design work by Vickers, the builder. Baker described his control as:

"My planning group monitored all plans in the Ministry and at the Shipbuilders prior to field officers reporting. We used to hold progress meetings at Barrow and Birkenhead which to some extent delved deeper than management wanted. But they were converted. We differed in our approach from former Ministry representatives in that we found out the truth, and people began to realise that this would happen. Whenever the Shipbuilder wanted to blame the Ministry, we got the appropriate official there. Similarly with sub-contractors.

A lot of people thought that our insistence on Testing and Quality Control was to save us from the embarrassment of a submarine failure on patrol. Of course, this had some validity, but the real reason was to save us from the embarrassment of never making the date.

I believe that we nearly succeeded in the end in bringing into the scene the idea that the timely completion must rank with the value of the concept. Right on Time and Right!"

After Polaris, Baker's role was extended further to cover all submarine project as Director Project Team (Submarines) (DPT). Over the next very busy decade, he led the projects for five classes of submarine (Dreadnought, Resolution, Valiant, Churchill and Swiftsure). Baker's final words on project management in defence were:

"The lesson for the [RCNC/MoD] now is that for success we have to ensure that we give as much attention to the Sketch Design of a Programme as we do to the Sketch Design of the artefact. We have to give as much attention to the development of programme plans as we did to the working drawings and we have to have the power of assessing the extent to which shipbuilders and allied facilities of all kinds are likely to be sufficient, and we have to ensure quality at every stage."

Baker continued in charge of DPT submarine projects until his retirement in 1968. In the year of his retirement, he was awarded a Knight Commander of the Bath.

== Landing craft projects ==
In World War II, Winston Churchill made the development of landing craft a priority. Baker was tasked with designing a full range of landing craft for personnel and vehicles. The pre-war craft were too slow and had very dubious stability. (Baker once saw a whole line of five turn over when under tow, due to free water on the deck.) Baker realised the need for cross-Channel landing craft carrying the biggest tanks envisaged, 40 tons and landing them on a beach with a slope of 1:35. Baker set out his plan as:

"My innovations related to the features as follows:

a) The appearance of the craft, flush deck with a hold.

b) Floating dock type section, 'i' could never approach 'I'. [the loss of stability due to water in the hold (i) could never approach that due to the complete waterplane (I)]

c) Acceptance of the fact that the Bow Ramp would always leak, so I arranged the Tank Deck [bottom of the hold] above the hinge at the bow and fitted with preventative watertight doors at the highest point. Between the ramp and door drains overboard. This system worked like a charm.

Baker designed a family of Landing Craft for Tanks. He started with the basic design LCT(1), capable of carrying 3 (40 ton) tanks. This he developed into a bigger craft LCT(2) capable of carrying 7 tanks and with a greater range. In turn, was stretched by an extra 32ft for the design of the LCT(3), capable of carrying 11 Sherman tanks or five Churchill tanks. Finally, the beam was widen for the design of the LCT(4), capable of carrying nine Sherman tanks or six Churchill tanks. This demonstrates Baker's outstanding ability to develop and improve designs to meet the colossal logistical demand for the Sicily and Normandy landings.

It became clear there was a need for a 'mother' craft to carry smaller landing craft across the oceans. Baker again showed his ingenuity and skill by developing the Landing Ship Dock concept. Baker was sent to the US with sketch designs, which he developed with the Americans into the Atlantic LST(2). These were built in the US and used in the amphibious landings In Sicily and Normandy on D-Day. For his work, Baker was awarded the US Medal of Freedom with Silver Palm.

== Royal Canadian Navy projects ==
Baker was seconded to the Royal Canadian Navy in 1948. He designed the ice breaker HMCS/CCGS Labrador. She was commissioned in 1954 as Her Majesty's Canadian Ship in the Royal Canadian Navy. In 1957 she was transferred to the Canadian Department of Transport before in 1962 joining the new Canadian Coast Guard as a Canadian Coast Guard ship. The design was an improved version of the United States Coast Guard Wind-class icebreaker.

Baker designed the Canadian St. Laurent-class destroyer class. The class is an anti-submarine frigate for use in the Atlantic. Baker developed the design by improving upon the Royal Navy's Whitby-class frigate for use in colder, harsher operating conditions. Rounded deck-edges were used to reduce ice formation. The design included a separate operations room from the bridge, NBCD citadel, and bunks for every crew member. The class was recognised as handsome and amongst the best seaboats of its size.

== Submarine projects ==
Baker was appointed project manager for HMS Dreadnought in 1958, forming the Dreadnought Project Team (DPT). He was responsible for driving through the design and building of the submarine. He described his appointment with mixed feelings that 'alternated between elation at the prospect and terror' (p184):

"Terror because just when they were about to sign a government to government agreement, I realised that not one of those who would have on my staff ... approved of me in any way, or of the scheme. They had pottered about for several years, and now had not only a solution, but a chieftain imposed on them. Of course, they all hated it ... My terror derived in part from the conviction that even if we had the Rickover reactor, all and sundry would want to 'improve' it and feed in their national ideas through the ship."

Baker's leadership and determination avoided the above loss of clarity. The design was completed and the submarine laid down in June 1959, less than two years from his appointment as project manager. To achieve this the design combined the unchanged 'back end' US reactor and propulsion with the British design of the 'front end'.

Dreadnought was followed by the first fully British nuclear submarines, the Valiant-class submarines. The British reactor and propulsion design was adopted, including the 'machinery raft' to reduce noise transmission. A stronger pressure hull was chosen for greater diving depths. Notably the pressure hull was a combination of different diameters for different compartments. Given the drive for the Royal Navy to have its own nuclear submarine fleet, the design was completed and Valiant was laid down in January 1962, only two and a half years after Dreadnought.

In 1962, the US agreed to sell the Polaris ballistic missile system to the UK. Baker was appointed as technical director, Polaris Executive (DPT). It was a national priority to get the new deterrent to sea in the Resolution-class submarine. Urgency required that the design combined the US missile compartment with the UK Valiant class reactor and propulsion, along with the UK front end. Therefore, there continued to be sections of pressure hull sections with differing diameter. The design was completed and Resolution was laid down in February 1964, less than 18 months from the signing of the sale agreement. Resolution was launched in September 1966, commissioned in October 1967, and operational after weapon live firing in February 1968.

The DPT organisation was renamed Director Project Team (Submarines), managing the full portfolio of submarine designs. Baker took on responsibility for the final two submarine classes developed in the 1960s.

The Churchill-class submarines were a repeat of the Valiant-class design with improvements to sonars and periscopes. Their design was delayed until the Resolution-class design was completed. Churchill was laid down in June 1967, launched in December 1968, commissioned in July 1970. Most notable of this class was HMS Conqueror, which sank ARA General Belgrano in the Falklands War in 1982.

The Swiftsure class was a radical new submarine design. The pressure hull was the same diameter throughout, simplifying the structure design and the construction. The design focused on reducing the noise signature of the submarines, reducing the chances of detection distance materially. Swiftsure was laid down in June 1969, launched in September 1971, and commissioned in April 1973. The class operated from the 1970s Cold War through to Persian Gulf patrols in the 2000s.

== Class designs ==
- Bangor-class minesweeper
- Halcyon-class minesweeper
- Landing Craft Tanks: LCT(1) to LCT(4)
- Landing Ship Dock: LST(2)
- CCGS Labrador
- St. Laurent-class destroyer class
- HMS Dreadnought: Naval architect/chief constructor: Reginald RJ Daniel. Constructor: Louis Rydill.
- Resolution-class ballistic missile submarine Naval architect/chief constructor: Sidney Palmer
- Valiant-class submarine Naval architect/chief constructor: Reginald RJ Daniel
- Churchill-class submarine Naval architect/chief constructor: Norman Hancock
- Swiftsure-class submarine Naval architect/chief constructor: Norman Hancock
