= Keith Foulger =

British naval architect (1925–2021)

- Born: 14 May 1925; Colchester, Essex
- Died: 24 May 2021 (aged 96)
- Education: Southgate County School; London University; Royal Naval College, Greenwich
- Spouse: Joyce Hart
- Children: One son and one daughter
- Engineering career
- Discipline: Naval architecture
- Institutions: Royal Corps of Naval Constructors
- Projects: Porpoise-class submarines Explorer-class submarines HMS Dreadnought; Valiant-class submarines Trafalgar-class submarines HMS Victory restoration

Keith Foulger, RCNC (14 May 1925 – 24 May 2021) was a British naval architect. As a child he aspired to a career as a Royal Navy officer but failed the eyesight requirements and so started a career in naval architecture. Foulger joined the Royal Corps of Naval Constructors and worked on designs for the Porpoise and Explorer-class submarines. Following the 1958 US–UK Mutual Defence Agreement Foulger was chosen to lead a team to observe the construction of the Skipjack-class submarine being constructed for the US Navy. The first British nuclear submarine HMS Dreadnought would use the same reactor and so the aft portion had to accommodate that design. Foulger's job was to minimise any mismatch between this portion and the forward section which was to be a wholly British design.

After Dreadnought was completed in 1960 Foulger worked on the Valiant-class, the first entirely British-designed-and-built nuclear submarines. The two Valiant-class boats were launched by 1965; Foulger then served as a chief constructor for a number of surface vessels and in staff roles. He returned to submarine projects in 1973, overseeing the construction of the six Swiftsure-class submarines. He afterwards oversaw the design of the seven Trafalgar-class submarines and the construction of the first two of these vessels. From 1979 to 1983 Foulger had responsibility for the construction of all Royal Navy submarines including, for the first time, the ballistic missile vessels. This included the very early stages of the Vanguard-class submarine designs. From 1983 until his retirement in 1985 Foulger was Director of Naval Construction. In retirement he worked for ten years as chief naval architect for the restoration work on HMS Victory.

== Early life and career ==
Keith Foulger was born in Colchester, Essex on 14 May 1925. He was one of three children of Percy Foulger, a civil servant, and Kate Foulger née Knight. He attended Southgate County School, which was then a grammar school. Foulger expressed an ambition to join the Royal Navy so often that his parents nicknamed him "Little Nelson". He joined the City of London Sea Cadets but upon reaching enlistment age found that his eyesight did not meet the minimum requirements set by the navy. Foulger studied mechanical engineering at London University and afterwards joined the Royal Corps of Naval Constructors (RCNC), the body responsible for constructing Royal Navy vessels. Foulger attended the Royal Naval College, Greenwich and achieved a first class degree in naval architecture. Foulger met his wife, Joyce Hart, whilst at a ball at the college. They married in 1951 and had a son and a daughter.

From 1950 to 1954 Foulger was at the RCNC facility at Foxhill, Bath, Somerset where he worked on the designs for the Porpoise-class submarines (built 1956–59) and on the experimental hydrogen peroxide-powered Explorer-class submarines (launched 1954–55). Afterwards Foulger spent three years at Portsmouth Royal Dockyard refitting and repairing submarines, returning to Bath in 1957.

== Dreadnought project ==
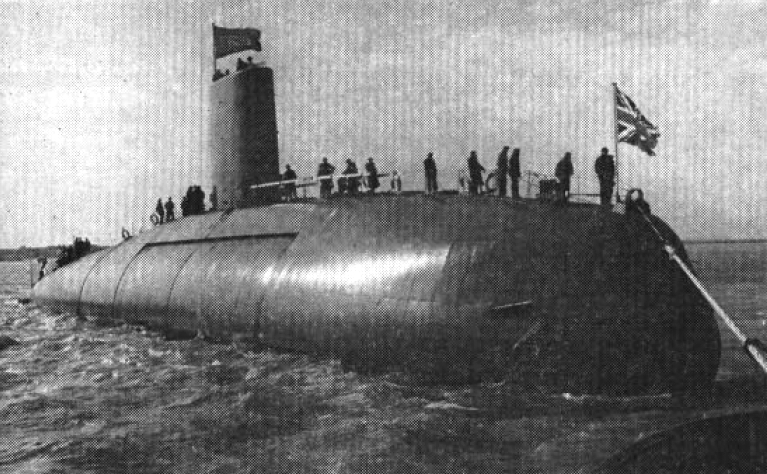
Dreadnought soon after launch

From the late 1940s the US Navy had been working on the first nuclear-powered submarines, which would have an advantage in submerged endurance over diesel-powered vessels. The first of these, the USS Nautilus was launched in 1954. The 1958 US–UK Mutual Defence Agreement granted the British access to American nuclear expertise and they were keen to develop their own nuclear submarines. HMS Dreadnought was to be the first of these. Foulger headed a team sent to the Electric Boat Company at Groton, Connecticut, to look at the Skipjack-class submarine which was being built there. Dreadnought was to use the American-developed S5W reactor and so the rear end of the vessel had to match that of the Skipjack design. The front end of the Dreadnought was a wholly British design which included a very large conformal array sonar. There were concerns that there would be a mismatch between the two parts of the boat and a key part of Foulger's mission was to make sure this did not happen. Foulger described the project as "the most exciting and fascinating job any constructor could wish to have".

To access American technical information Foulger had to deal with Vice Admiral Hyman G. Rickover who was in charge of the US Navy's nuclear submarine programme. Rickover was difficult to work with as he had opposed the sharing of information with the British and Foulger initially found his efforts were obstructed by Rickover. Foulger eventually got the information he needed, in part because the role allowed him to wear the uniform of a Royal Navy commander, Foulger's first uniformed role. He considered that the uniform played a key part in winning the respect and cooperation of US Navy engineering officers. Dreadnought, launched in 1960, was three times larger than conventionally-powered British submarines. It featured innovations unique to the British such as torpedo tubes able to work at greater depth than those in the Skipjack class, a bridge fin positioned further aft and improved welding practices. These latter changes made the Dreadnought more stable at high speed than the Skipjacks.

== Later roles ==
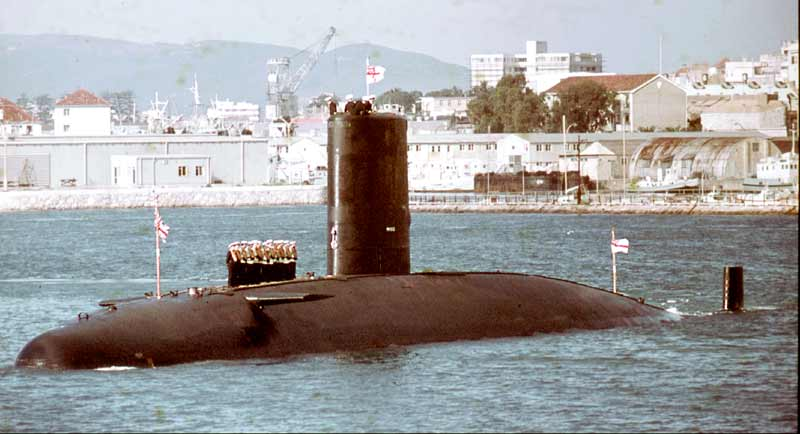
Warspite pictured in 1970

After the completion of the Dreadnought project in 1960 Foulger moved to the team responsible for the design and construction of the Valiant-class submarines. These were the first wholly British nuclear submarines, having British designed and built nuclear reactors (the Rolls-Royce PWR). With more control over the design the team could follow traditional British submarine building practice and produced a design that was simpler than Dreadnought and had a stronger hull. Foulger helped naval architect R. J. Daniel select nickel aluminium bronze as the material for the class's hull valves. These had previously been made from gunmetal but the new material was assessed to have better strength and shock resistance and fewer flaws. After the Valiant project (Valiant was launched in 1963 and Warspite in 1965) Foulger served as chief constructor for a number of surface vessels. He attended the Senior Officer's War Course at Greenwich over the winter of 1967–68 and served on the staff of the Commander-in-Chief Fleet. Foulger was again chief constructor for a number of surface vessel projects from 1968–73.

From 1973 Foulger returned to submarines; as Assistant Director of Naval Construction (ADNC) he oversaw construction of the six Swiftsure-class submarines and the design of their successors the seven Trafalgar-class submarines. He remained in the post long enough to supervise the construction of the first two Trafalgar class boats: Trafalgar (launched 1981) and Turbulent (launched 1982). The Swiftsure and Trafalgar classes were built to a restricted budget but were faster and stealthier than earlier British submarines. To keep within budget Foulger found he had to turn down frequent requests from submarine commanders for their vessels to be upgraded with newer equipment.

From 1979 Foulger had responsibility for all British submarine construction including, for the first time, the ballistic missile submarines. During this period the Royal Navy was seeking replacements for the 1960s-built Resolution-class submarines. A number of options were considered that included extending the life of the Resolution-class before it was decided, in 1980, to procure the American-made Trident missile system and build four new ballistic missile submarines, the Vanguard-class (launched in the 1990s).

Foulger served as Director of Naval Construction from 1983 to 1985, with the equivalent Royal Navy rank of rear admiral.

== Retirement ==
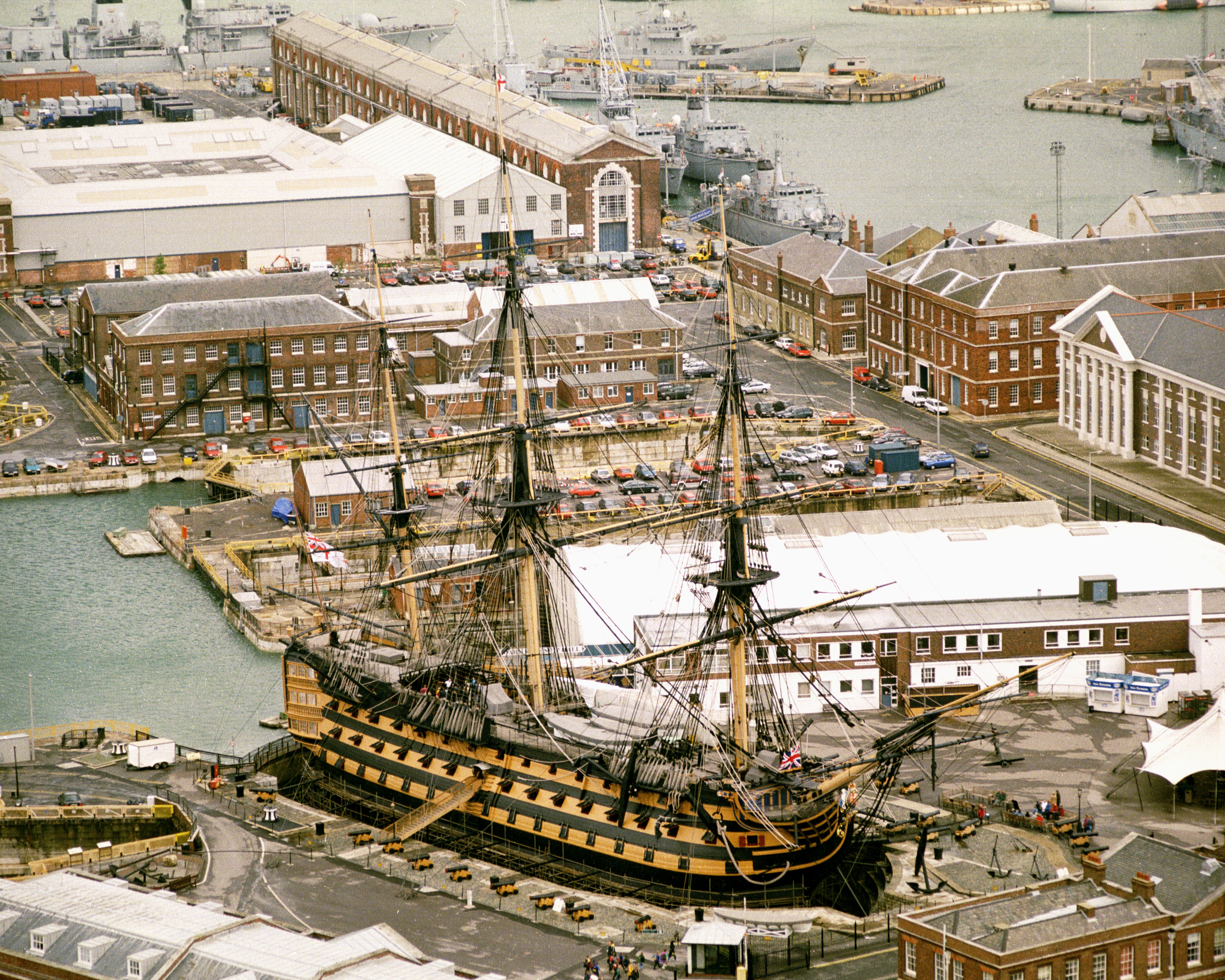
Victory pictured in 1999

Foulger retired after his period as director, though afterwards served for ten years as chief naval architect for the restoration of HMS Victory, a first-rate ship of the line launched in 1765 and Admiral Nelson's flagship at the Battle of Trafalgar. In retirement he lived in Grittleton, Wiltshire where he helped restore the village's church of St Mary the Virgin, which dates to the 12th century. Foulger also maintained an interest in gardening and taking part in motor tours in continental Europe. He also contributed to the nuclear submarine chapter of D. K. Brown and George Moore's 2012 book Rebuilding the Royal Navy: Warship Design Since 1945. At the age of 90 Foulger paid a visit to HMS Talent, one of the Trafalgar class, whilst it was in service. He died of bowel cancer on 24 May 2021.
