= David K. Brown =

British naval architect (1828–2008)

David K. Brown, MEng, CEng, FRINA, RCNC (1928–2008) was a noted British naval architect. He was a member of the Royal Corps of Naval Constructors (RCNC), designing warships for the Royal Navy. He rose through the ranks to become the Deputy Chief Naval Architect. He was also greatly valued as the historian of the RCNC, and the educator of junior naval architects in the RCNC.

== Early Life ==
Brown was born in Leeds in 1928. He studied naval architecture at University of Liverpool, obtaining a First Class degree in 1949, and MEng in 1951. He won a prestigious cadetship to join the Royal Corps of Naval Constructors, and obtained a First Class certificate in naval construction from Royal Naval College, Greenwich in 1953. He spent his sea-time on the aircraft carrier HMS Glory in the Mediterranean, and the cruiser HMS Euryalus, plus Loch class frigate and T-class submarines.

== Career ==
Brown began his career as an Assistant Constructor in 1954 in the Forward Design Group in London. He worked on the Tribal-class general-purpose frigate alongside Kenneth Rawson, completing weight and stability calculations. He then moved to the Admiralty Experimental Works at Haslar, researching propellers and cavitation.

Brown moved to Bath and worked on designs for the new nuclear submarine fleet, in particular radiation shielding. He then worked on hydrodynamic design work in Bath.

In the mid-1960s, Brown was promoted to Constructor and appointed as the naval architecture lecturer during the transfer from Royal Naval College, Greenwich, under Professor Louis Rydill, from 1967 to 1970. He created the new hydrodynamics course for undergraduate and post-graduate study at University College London.

On promotion to Chief Constructor, Brown returned to AEW Haslar in charge of all experimental work, facilities and instrumentation. He returned to Bath as Head of the Organic Materials Division, followed by a lengthy period as Chief Constructor on the preliminary designs of all surface ships. The Castle-class offshore patrol vessel was one his designs. Brown used his knowledge of hydrodynamics and motion to decided that the length of 75m was the minimum necessary to operate helicopters from these ship. He also worked on advanced naval vehicles, including the Boeing Jetfoil HMS Speedy.

On promotion to Assistant Director Brown took over the post of Head of Ship Design Policy, covering hydrodynamics, habitability, materials, structures, vulnerability, and computer aided design. He also arranged much appreciated talks and lectures for junior constructors at Foxhill during the 1980s.

Brown was promoted to Deputy Chief Naval Architect in 1982, a post he retained until his retirement in 1988.

Brown was Fellow of the Royal Institution of Naval Architects, and rose to be Vice-President.

Brown was a prolific writer of papers read at the Royal Institution of Naval Architects. He also authored the history of the Royal Corps of Naval Constructors published during the centenary of that organisation in 1983.

After retirement, he turned his attention to writing. He published many books on the technical development of warships in the Royal Navy, see the list below. He was Vice President and then in 2000 the President of the World Ship Society. He also wrote articles and book reviews for the Journal of Naval Engineering (an internal MoD publication). He regularly contributed to RINA's Warship periodical.

== Personal life ==
David Brown married late in life, having met teacher Avis Pritchard while teaching at Greenwich/UCL in 1967-70. They had a daughter Patricia in 1969 and a son Richard in 1971. After their divorce, Avis and David remained on good terms.

Brown retained a life-long interest in rally and motor racing, and latterly in industrial archaeology.

Brown died in Bath, Somerset, on 15 April 2008.

== Books written ==
- Brown, David K. (1991). The Future British Surface Fleet: Options for Medium-Sized Navies. Conway. ISBN 0851775578.
- —— (1992). The Eclipse Of The Big Gun: The Warship 1906-1945. Conway Maritime. ISBN 0851779530.
- —— (1993). Paddle Warships: The Earliest Steam Powered Fighting Ships 1815-1850. Conway Maritime Press. ISBN 0851776167.
- Brown, David K., ed. (1996). The Design and Construction of British Warships 1939-1945. Vol. I: Major Surface Ships. Conway. ISBN 0851776736.
- Brown, David K., ed. (1996). The Design and Construction of British Warships 1939-1945. Vol. II: Submarines, Escorts and Coastal Forces. Conway. ISBN 0851776744.
- Brown, David K., ed. (1996). The Design and Construction of British Warships 1939-1945. Vol. III: Landing Craft & Auxiliary vessels. Naval Institute Press. ISBN 1557501629.
- —— (1999). The Grand Fleet: Warship Design and Development 1906-1922. Naval Institute Press. ISBN 155750315X.
- —— (2003) [1997]. Warrior to Dreadnought: Warship Development 1860–1905. London: Caxton Editions. ISBN 1-84067-529-2.
- Brown, David K.; Moore, George (2003). Rebuilding the Royal Navy: Warship Design Since 1945. Chatham Publishing. ISBN 1861762224.
- —— (2007). Atlantic Escorts: Allied Anti-submarine Vessels, 1939-1945. Naval Institute Press.
- —— (2007). Atlantic Escorts : Ships weapons and Tactics in World War 2. Naval Institute Press. ISBN 978-1591140122.
- —— (2012) [2000]. Nelson to Vanguard: Warship Design 1923-1945. Naval Institute Press. ISBN 978-1848321496.
- —— (2015) [1990]. Before the Ironclad: The Development of Ship Design, Propulsion, and Armament in the Royal Navy, 1815-60. Naval Institute Press. ISBN 978-1848322585.
