= Victor Shepheard =

British naval architect (1893-1989)

Sir Victor George Shepheard KCB, RCNC (21 March 1893 – 8 December 1989) was a British naval architect. He served as Director of Naval Construction at the Admiralty from 1951 to 1958.

== Early life ==
Shepheard was in Plymouth in 1893. He entered Royal Dockyard, Devonport as an apprentice in 1907. He obtained a cadetship with the Royal Corps of Naval Constructors and attended the Royal Naval College, Greenwich where he obtained high final marks on the naval architecture course in 1915.

After graduating in 1915, he served with the Royal Navy as a Constructor Lieutenant and was appointed to the battleship HMS Agincourt. In 1916, he was present at the Battle of Jutland.

== Career ==
Returning to the Admiralty as an Assistant Constructor in 1919, Shepheard worked for Stanley Vernon Goodall on the design of 'light cruisers'.

He was then appointed to the Warship Production Department, working for William Berry. In 1924, Shepheard was appointed Assistant Overseer on the build of the battleship HMS Nelson at Armstrong's Yard at Elswick, Newcastle. He was responsible for ensuring the weight of the ship did not exceed the 35,000 ton limit allowed in the Washington Treaty, providing proposals as necessary. Following a short period at Portsmouth Dockyard and the Dockyard Department in Whitehall, he became the Principal Ship Overseer on the cruiser HMS Norfolk at Govan, Glasgow.

Returning to the Admiralty in 1930 on promotion to Constructor Shepheard was appointed to DNC in charge of sloop design.

Shepheard was Professor of Naval Architecture at Royal Naval College, Greenwich from 1934 to 1939.

The war brought rapid promotion to Chief Constructor in 1939, and then in 1942 as Assistant Director of Naval Construction responsible for battleship designs. He also worked on the Mulberry harbour design. For this work he was made a Chevalier of the Légion d'honneur.

Shepheard was promotion to deputy director in 1947. He received a CB for his work in 1950.

In 1951, Shepheard was appointed as Director of Naval Construction. He was responsible for the post-war designs, including the Porpoise-class submarines, the County-class guided missile destroyer with their combined steam and gas-turbine propulsion, and the initial designs of the Dreadnought submarine.

However, Shepheard was most proud of his work on the HMY Britannia, designed in 1952. She was designed by the DNC staff in his London Office, under the charge of ADNC AN Harrison. The work required frequent consultations by Shepheard and Harrison with HM King George VI and later with HM Queen Elizabeth II and HRH The Duke of Edinburgh. The designed required a comfortable motion, requiring stabiliser. Trials exposed singing propellors, and these were reprofiled to reduce noise levels onboard.

After retiring as Director of Naval Construction in 1958, he served as a director of a number of companies involved in ship design and building. He was president of the Smeatonian Society of Civil Engineers in 1976. He died on 8 December 1989 aged 96.

== RCNC Association ==
Shepheard was a committed proponent of the RCNC Association. In the early 1920s helped set up the Association. It was a particularly hard financial time for 2nd class Assistant Constructors. They found their salaries as lower than when they entered Greenwich for training five years earlier. was particularly irritating that temporary ACs, with inferior qualifications, were recruited from industry at more than twice the salary. The position improved after about two years when a small rise in salary was approved.

In 1947, Shepheard became Chairman of the Association. Evidence was presented to the Eastham Committee who were making recommendations on pay. Shepheard personally gave evidence to the Committee as to the inadequate pay. He recommended the RCNC should become a uniformed branch. This proposal was rejected. The Committee concluded that:

"Our enquiries have convinced us that the RCNC is, in fact, seriously undermanned and underpaid."

== Awards and honours ==
In 1947, Shepheard was made a Chevalier of the Légion d'honneur for his wartime work on the Mulberry harbour design.

He was admitted to the Order of the Bath as a Companion in 1950, and advanced to Knight Commander in 1954.

A blue plaque was erected at his home in Manor Place, Manor Park, Chislehurst.
