= Kenneth Rawson =

British naval architect (-2020)

Kenneth John Rawson FREng RCNC (born 1926 deceased 29 February 2020) was a naval architect for the British Royal Navy. He was Chief Naval Architect of the Royal Navy from 1979-1983. He was Professor of Naval Architecture at University College London, and Professor of Design and Technology at Brunel University.

== Early life ==
Rawson was brought up in Portsmouth, Hampshire, where he attended the Northern Secondary School from 1938. The school was evacuated to Winchester during the bombing of Portsmouth in World War II. Rawson started his apprenticeship in an electrical workshop in Petersfield run by the Royal Navy Dockyard, Portsmouth. In 1944, he moved to the main dockyard as a shipwright apprentice. He won a cadetship to join the Royal Corps of Naval Constructors, spending his first year of 1946 at Royal Naval Engineering College, Keyham. In 1947 he moved to Royal Naval College, Greenwich and completed the three-year naval architecture course under Alfred Sims (subsequently Director of Naval Construction). He left with a first-class certificate in 1950, and completed his sea-time on the aircraft carrier HMS Indomitable in the Mediterranean, the cruiser HMS Swiftsure, and the destroyer HMS Corunna.

== Career ==
Rawson began his career in 1951 as an Assistant Constructor at the Naval Construction Research Establishment (NCRE) in Dunfermline, Scotland. He worked on photoelastic stress analysis and used it to recommend that beam-end brackets be discontinued, as they were sources of stress concentration.

In 1953, Rawson was appointed to the Forward Design Group (FDG) in London, a small team working projects directly to the DNC, then Victor Shepheard. As an Assistant Constructor, Rawson worked on the design of HMY Britannia. Shepheard took a personal interest in the design, frequently meeting in person with Queen Elizabeth II and Prince Phillip. The design priority was for an elegant design with comfortable motion. Rawson completed the inclining experiment, finding a relatively low metacentric height (GM), which is linked to a slow roll but large roll angle. Britannia was designed with stabilisers to provide for a pleasant magnitude roll.

Whilst in London, Rawson was asked by the Professor, Sidney John Palmer, to lecture on hydrodynamics at the Royal Naval College, Greenwich. In response, Rawson proposed that he lectured on structure (using his NCRE knowledge). This was agreed, and he set about creating a new structures syllabus and lecture course. In 1954, Rawson was promoted to Constructor. As the frigate design section in Bath was overloaded, the design of the Tribal-class general purpose frigate remained with the Forward Design Group (FDG) in London. He remain with FDG until 1957.

From 1957 to 1959, Rawson was seconded to Lloyds Register of Shipping. He developed new rules for freeboard and the link to wave height for the new much longer ships being designed and built post-war. In 1960, Rawson finally moved to Bath. Rawson led the team which completed the detailed design for the modernisation of HMS Eagle., which took place in Devonport Dockyard from 1959 to 1964. The island was completely replaced. A new 2 1/2-inch (64 mm) armoured deck was installed. He then moved to the weapons section of the newly created Ship Department. The Royal Navy was then looking for missile systems for their ships. Sea Wolf and Sea Dart were developed. Rawson would have worked on the positioning of the launchers, magazines, radars within a frigate or destroyer design.

In 1965 he was approached by Eric Tupper to join him in revising the standard textbook on naval architecture. Instead, they wrote a new book "Basic Ship Theory", which was published in 1968. Each wrote eight chapters (unspecified) of the two volume textbook. The book was revised five times, the last in 2001.

In 1967, Rawson was promoted to Chief Constructor. He described his next five and half years as "indifferent work" in the Department of Fleet Maintenance. He moved back to London with his family.

In 1972, Rawson was appointed Professor of Naval Architecture at University College London (UCL). There he worked with Professor RED Bishop and later Geraint Price. He taught Charles Betts, David Andrews, Peter Chamberlain and Douglas Pattison. In 1977, Rawson returned to Bath as the Assistant Director for the Forward Design Group. He sponsored the adoption of computer-aided design for concept studies. His team developed the concept designs for the Type 24 frigate. Rawson was promoted to Chief Naval Architect in 1979. He was spokesman for the Ministry of Defence in the "short fat ship" controversy. A major reorganisation was proposed, with design work being placed with industry. Rawson chose to resign in 1983 to take up an exciting new opportunity.

In 1983, Rawson was invited by the Vice-Chancellor, RED Bishop, to become Professor and Head of Department for Design Technology at Brunel University, where he remained until 1989. In this role he combined the craft, design and technology department from Brunel University with the craft department from Shoreditch College, Egham on a site at Coopers Hill, Runnymede. The new department dealt with craft skills (such as silversmithing) through to design (using prototype modelling and computer aided design), blending engineering design with aesthetics. He was appointed a Fellow of the Royal Academy of Engineering in 1984.

Rawson was appointed Chair of the Council of the Royal Institution of Naval Architects in 1987. That year, the ferry Herald of Free Enterprise capsized leaving Zeebrugge harbour. Rawson took on the challenge of pressing for design improvements for Roll-on/roll-off (RORO) ferries, for which he was well placed having no connection with ferry companies. RINA established an in-house technical committee to investigate ROROs and concluded that they were 'unacceptably vulnerable'. The work of Rawson and RINA assisted the International Maritime Organization in updating it Safety of Life at Sea (SOLAS) convention to reflect modern day RORO vessels (SOLAS 90).

Rawson received an honorary doctorate (DSc) from his home town University of Portsmouth in 1996.

In 2010, Rawson along with Eric Tupper were awarded the RINA William Froude medal for their conspicuous contribution to naval architecture through their book "Basic Ship Theory".

== The 'short fat ship' controversy ==
The MoD issued an 'Invitation to Tender' to industry for an offshore patrol vessel. Nine companies put in bids. One of the companies was Thornycroft Giles and Associates (TGA), a small company based in Guernsey, led by David Giles and supported by Peter Thornycroft. Their design proposal was for a fast patrol boat called Osprey, which had already be sold the design to the Danish Fishery Protection Authorities, as the Havoernen, built in Frederikshavn in 1979 with a length of 47 metres (154 ft 2 in), speed of 18 knots (33 km/h; 21 mph) and German gross tonnage of 324 tons (later stated as 652 gross tons on website Shipspotter).

In assessing tenders, the MoD would assess the viability of each design. TGA proposed the displacement as 250 tons. The MoD estimated that the vessel would actually displace twice that weight, reducing the freeboard. It fast rolling and high accelerations would affect its seakeeping, and here were concerns about whether it could operate helicopters safely. The design was rejected. The tender by Hall Russell was accepted, with what would become the Castle-class patrol vessel (length 75 metres (246 ft 1 in), speed 20 knots (37 km/h; 23 mph) and displacement full load of 1,500 tons).

TGA raised the issue with the press and in Parliament. As a result a small team spent a few days on Havornen off Denmark. Warren has recorded his experience as:

"The boat behaved very much as we expected. It was lively, well built and low in the water. Like other fast patrol boats, it was lightly built and would succumb to small collisions which, of course were quite likely in coming alongside a fishing vessel made of steel. It did not have a full load fuel when we were on board but the loadline was close to the water."

Following this, TGA made a bid for the Type 23 contract. The proposed design was for an enlarged Osprey (Havornen) design called the S90, with a displacement of 1,300 tons. The design was assessed as not meet the Naval Staff Requirements. A decision was made proceed with the Type 23 design in 1983, and reported in Parliament. In respect of the S90, the Secretary for Defence Procurement stated in response to a question:

"After an exhaustive analysis of the S90 proposal, which took into account advice from the design consultants Y-ARD, and the marine technology board of the Defence Scientific Advisory Council, it was concluded that the proposed design was fundamentally unsuited to the key requirements of the type 23 frigate. It lacked sufficient space and did not meet our requirements on speed, endurance, seakeeping, damaged stability and noise."

A significant issue was the proposed speed of the design. TGA asserted that the design would benefit from lift, like a 'planing' vessel, rising out of the water to reduce resistance, as seen in speed boats. Larger ships are 'displacement' vessel, with resistance based on 'pushing through' the water. Warships resistance had been extensively studied and modelled in the UK since the pioneer William Froude had built a model tank for the Admiralty in the 1870s.

In 1981, Rawson, then the Chief Naval Architect, had appeared on Newsnight along with David Giles and Admiral Sir Henry Leach. In 1983, Rawson appeared on Panorama. The New Statesman described it as "an unmitigated disaster for the MoD and a nail in the in for Mr Rawson".

The controversy continued. In 1986 an independent committee chaired by Lord Hill-Norton issued a report. Given the continued pressure, in 1987 the government decided on an independent review. Lloyd's Register reported in 1988 with "Report of the Inquiry into hull forms for warships". The Maritime Committee of the Defence Scientific Advisory Committee consider the report in terms of seakeeping, resistance, propulsion, stability and endurance. The conclusion was that the design did not meet the speed, endurance requirements. There was insufficient space within the design, which is used for weapons, machinery and crew. Helicopter operations were also an issue. First, a large flight deck would take up a greater proportion of the upper deck of a short ship. The longitudinal motions on the flight deck would be greater, limiting its use in heavy weather.

As a side issue, in the early 1980s British Shipbuilders had decided to model test a version of the Osprey hull. This raised the issue of infringement of intellectual property rights. British Shipbuilder settled litigation with TGA in 1987 for significant damages. Rawson gave witness evidence between 1981 and 1986 that the MoD had not been involved in this work, and had not disclosed commercially confidential TGA information to British Shipbuilders.

== Personal life ==
Rawson married Rhona Gill in 1950. They had three children (a daughter and two sons).

Rawson was a keen sportsman, playing rugby for Royal Naval Engineering College, Keyham and football for the Royal Naval College, Greenwich.

Rawson died 29 February 2020.

Rawson was the Secretary of the RCNC Association in the 1960s.
