= Jim Andrews (electrical engineer) =

British naval electrical engineer (1938-)

James E 'Jim' Andrews, CEng, FIET, RCNC (born 1938) is a former electrical engineer, renowned for being a determined and charismatic project director in the Royal Corps of Naval Constructors, supporting submarines and warships of the Royal Navy. He worked on nuclear submarine control and instrumentation, destroyer electrical systems, nuclear submarine refitting and planning. He retired as Principal Director Fleet Support in 1995.

== Early life ==
Andrews became an electrical apprentice at RN Aircraft Yard Fleetlands in 1954, attend Portsmouth Dockyard School. He won a prestigious electrical cadetship to join what became the Royal Naval Engineering Service in 1958. He attended the Royal Naval College, Greenwich and obtained a BSc (Hons) degree in 1961.

== Career ==
Andrews began his career in 1961 as an Assistant Electrical Engineer in section DPT5, working on the design and development of nuclear submarine reactor control and instrumentation equipment for the Swiftsure-class submarine, and the anglicisation of the US technical publications for HMS Dreadnought.

In 1968 on promotion to Grade 7, Andrews became head of DPT5. Andrews took over from George Allin, a professional relationship which would stretch across their careers.

From 1970 to 1974, Andrews was the head of the section responsible for the electrical system design for the Type 42 destroyer, during the period of the building and commissioning phase.

In 1974, Andrews was appointed to Gibraltar Dockyard as Deputy Manager of Yard Services, including managing all the electrical services for MOD/UK establishments on the rock.

In 1977, on promotion to Grade 6 (superintending grade), he was appointed to Chatham Dockyard as Project Manager (Planning) for nuclear submarine refitting. Until the completion of the refitting programme in 1983 (before the closure of the dockyard in 1984), Andrews was responsible for planning and completion of all the nuclear submarine refits at the yard (HMS Conqueror 1975, Courageous 1976, Churchill 1980). He was also responsible preparing the lay-up of HMS Dreadnought (S101) at the end of commission.

After a short period as assistant director (Planning & Programmes) at Chief Executive Dockyards (CED), in 1984 he was appointed to the Dockyard Planning Team in Whitehall managing the contractorisation of Devonport and Rosyth Dockyards. This team handled the tendering of the contracts, and the development of the new MOD overseeing organisation, Director General Ship Refitting (DGSR).

In 1988, Andrews was appointed as Director Submarine Projects at DGSR, overseeing full refits and short maintenance periods (DEDs) of all submarines. From 1989, he reported to George Allin as Director General. In 1992, Allin appointed Andrews Principal Director Ship Refitting, responsible for all ship and submarine refits.

In 1993, George Allin retired to be replaced by Roger Babbington as Director General, and Andrews was promoted to be Principal Director of Fleet Support, a post he held until his retirement in 1995.

Andrews was Deputy Head of the RCNC Electrical from 1993 to 1995. (The RNES and the RCNC merged in 1975. Each specialism had its own Deputy Head).
