= Richard Heaslip =

English Royal Navy rear admiral (1932–2025)

Rear-Admiral Richard Heaslip CB
- Born: 30 April 1932
- Died: 19 April 2025 (aged 92)
- Military career
- Allegiance: United Kingdom
- Branch: Royal Navy
- Rank: Rear-Admiral
- Commands: HMS Conqueror; HMS Valiant
- Conflicts: Falklands War
- Awards: Companion of the Order of the Bath

Rear-Admiral Richard George Heaslip CB (30 April 1932 – 19 April 2025) was an English Royal Navy officer who served as Flag Officer Submarines.

== Naval career ==
Educated at Chichester High School, Heaslip became commanding officer of the submarine HMS Conqueror in 1971 and commanding officer of the submarine HMS Valiant and also Captain of the 2nd Submarine Squadron in 1975, and in that role took part in the Queen's Silver Jubilee Fleet Review in June 1977. He went on to be Director of Defence Policy (Naval) in March 1982 and in that role provided policy advice during the Falklands War before becoming Flag Officer Submarines in November 1984 and retiring in May 1987. He was appointed a Companion of the Order of the Bath on 1 January 1987.

== Retirement and death ==
In retirement Heaslip became Director-General of the English-Speaking Union. In 1959 Heaslip married Lorna Jean Grayston; they have three sons and one daughter.

Heaslip died on 19 April 2025, aged 92.

Military offices
Preceded by Sir John Woodward	Flag Officer Submarines; 1984–1987	Succeeded by Frank Grenier
