= Peter Chamberlain (naval architect) =

British Royal Navy architect

Peter Chamberlain, BSc, FRINA, FREng, RCNC (b. 1939) is a retired naval architect and Project Manager for the Royal Navy. He rose to be Chief Executive of the Underwater Systems Executive, before joining BAE Systems and becoming Director of Engineering for BAE Sea Systems Group.

== Early life ==
Chamberlain was born in Kingston upon Thames in 1939. He studied mechanical engineering at Edinburgh University and obtained a first-class degree. Having listened to tales from his paternal grandfather, who had been an artificer and officer in the Royal Navy, he decided he would like to follow in his wake. In 1960 he won a place in the Royal Corps of Naval Constructors and completed the naval architecture course at Royal Naval College, Greenwich. In 1963, he spent his sea-time in the Middle East on submarines and warships.

== Career ==
Chamberlain began his career in 1964 as an Assistant Constructor in Bath, working on concept studies for the next generation of submarines.

In 1968 Chamberlain was promoted to Constructor and was appointed to the Naval Construction Research Establishment at Dunfermline, working on major computational analysis of ship structure. He carried out early work on the new Finite Element Analysis computer systems.

In 1974, Chamberlain was appointed lecturer in ship structures to postgraduate students at University College London.

In 1978, he returned to Bath on promotion to Chief Constructor as Head of Secretariat for Director General Ships. He then moved to be the head of the Surface Ships Forward Design Group. He commented on the results of this posting:

"I well remember the pride I felt when, early one morning, I stood on Plymouth Hoe and saw six of ‘my’ Type 23 frigates, with their signature shearline, proceeding to sea in line ahead."

In 1983, he attended the Royal College of Defence Studies, an indication he was destined for high office. In 1984, he was promoted Assistant Director (1*) and became Head of Secretariat to the Master-General of the Ordnance.

In 1985, Chamberlain was promoted again to be Director General Future Materiel Projects in London, a 2* post he held for two years. In 1987, Chamberlain was appointed Deputy Controller (Warship Equipment) and the in 1988 to be Chief of Underwater Systems Executive.

From 1988 to 1991 Chamberlain was Head of the Defence Research Agency Implementation Team.

Chamberlain left the MoD to join BAE Systems as Engineering Director Systems and Services. Chamberlain described the move thus:

"After the fall of the Berlin Wall, I took an opportunity to leave the Ministry of Defence. I joined BAE Systems and Services as Engineering Director ‘Rest of the World’ – meaning not the UK. I found myself with responsibility for engineering teams in many countries performing a wide range of tasks, from fatigue-life renewal of advanced fighter jets to supporting the creation of new towns in the desert. I also pioneered major programs of innovation throughout the entire company."

In 1999 he became Director of the ANZAC Weapons Improvement Programme for BAE Land and Sea Systems. Chamberlain remained with BAE until 2002, completing his time as Director of Engineering for BAE Sea Systems Group, sorting out engineering interfaces between the prime contractor and shipbuilding teams for the Astute-class submarine.

Chamberlain was elected a Fellow of the Royal Academy of Engineering in 1988.

== Personal life ==
Chamberlain was born in Kingston-upon-Thames in 1939.

He retired to Italy, where he runs his own vineyard.
