= Sidney John Palmer =

British naval architect (1913-2001)

- Born: 1913-11-28; Pembroke Dock
- Died: 2001-04-14; Bath
- Education: Royal Naval College, Greenwich
- Honours: CB, OBE

Sidney John Palmer, CB, OBE, RCNC (28 November 1913 to 14 April 2001) was a renowned British naval architect of the Royal Navy. He was Deputy Director General Ships and Head of the Royal Corps of Naval Constructors from 1968 to 1973.

== Early life ==
Palmer was born in Pembroke Dock on 28 November 1913. He was the only son of Hannah Merriman and Sidney Palmer. His father died when Sidney was six years old. His mother described her occupation as 'Plain Sewing' in the 1921 Welsh census. So his early life would have been very challenging. He moved with his mother to Portsmouth to improve his prospects.

Palmer won a prestigious cadetship to join the Royal Corps of Naval Constructors in 1932. Palmer worked at Devonport Royal Dockyard in 1932/33, where he met his future wife, Mavis Hallett. He studied naval architecture at Royal Naval College, Greenwich from 1934 to 1937.

== Career ==
Palmer began his career in 1938 as an Assistant Constructor at the Admiralty Experiment Works, Haslar, working on hydrodynamics. By that time there were increasing problems associated with cavitation on the propellers of fast craft, such as torpedo boats. In response, Palmer designed a new cavitation tunnel, operational in 1941.

From March 1942, Palmer had three hectic years at the Royal Dockyard, Portsmouth as an acting Constructor at the height of the war, which included the main support task for the Normandy landings. He followed this with three years with the British Pacific Fleet as a Constructor Commander. He led the dockyard team in Sydney in 1945, supporting the fleet and 'fleet train' to the Pacific Fleet operating out of Australia. He then transferred to Hong Kong with his family, where he stayed until 1948.

Palmer returned to the Director of Naval Construction department in charge of aircraft carrier designs, including the completion of HMS Eagle and HMS Ark Royal.

From 1953 to 1957, Palmer was Professor of Naval Architecture at Royal Naval College, Greenwich. During the 1950s, the increasing opportunities for higher education resulted in fewer boys with potential for the RCNC entering the dockyards. So in 1956, Palmer inaugurated a new direct entry from school to the RCNC at Greenwich. Entrants were required to have outstanding A Level passes in Pure Maths, Applied Maths and Physics (or near equivalents).

In 1960, Palmer became assistant director of Naval Construction responsible for submarine designs. He led several delegations to the US. In 1961 Palmer wrote a technical evaluation report, which informed the decision to proceed with the Polaris programme. He was Deputy Director Naval Construction (Polaris) from 1963 to 1967. His chosen design combined the US missile compartment with a small increase in pressure hull diameter to match that of the Valiant-class hull, and interposed a short, additional machinery space where the pipes and cables from the US weapon systems could be adjusted to align with the corresponding services in the British reactor compartment. A completely new fore-end was designed to incorporate the British conventional weapons.

In 1967, Palmer became Deputy and then Director of Naval Ship Production.

In 1968, Palmer became Deputy Director General Ships and Head of the Royal Corps of Naval Constructors. He retired in 1973.

Palmer was awarded a CB (Companion of the Order of the Bath) in 1972 Birthday Honours list. Palmer had been awarded an OBE in the 1953 New Year Honours List.

== Personal life ==
Palmer married to Mavis Hallett in 1941. They had 4 sons: Jeremy, Timothy, Jonathan and Christopher. They had 11 grandchildren and many great grandchildren.

Palmer died on 14 April 2001 and is buried in Haycombe Cemetery, Bath. Mavis survived him, dying in 2004. He was predeceased by his son, Jeremy.
