= Stanley Vernon Goodall =

British naval architect (1883-1965)

- Born: 1883-03-18; Poplar, London
- Died: 1965-02-24
- Education: Royal Naval College, Greenwich
- Honours: KCB (Knight Commander of the Bath)

Sir Stanley Vernon Goodall, KCB, OBE, RCNC (18 April 1883 – 24 February 1965) was a British naval architect. A member of the Royal Corps of Naval Constructors, he was Director of Naval Construction from 1936 to 1944.

== Early life ==
Goodall was born at the fire station in West India Dock Road, Poplar, London. His parents were Samuel Goodall, fireman, and Eliza Summers.

Goodall was educated at Owen's School, Islington. He intended to become an engineer officer in the Royal Navy.

== Career ==
Goodall began his training as an engineering officer in the Royal Navy. He studied at the Royal Naval Engineering College, Devonport (often referred to as Keyham).

In 1901, he transferred to become a Royal Corps of Naval Constructors student. He achieved one of the highest ever scores on the naval architecture course at the Royal Naval College, Greenwich. He was a fine rugby and tennis player.

Goodall became an Assistant Constructor in 1907. He worked on the Arethusa-class cruiser design. Their high forecastle and 450 ft length resulted in fairly good seaboats in southern North Sea weather. Their mixed armament of 6in and 4in guns was selected to deal with destroyers. The top speed of 30 knots was intended to make them ideal scouting ships.

In 1914, he became an instructor on the naval architecture course at Royal Naval College, Greenwich. He joined the staff of Sir Eustace Tennyson-d'Eyncourt (DNC). He worked on the Courageous-class battlecruiser.

Within days of the Battle of Jutland in 1916, Goodall accompanied Sir Eustace Tennyson-d'Eyncourt (DNC) to assess the battle damage of the fleet. At the end of the war d'Eyncourt and Goodall were able to review the designs of the surrendered High Seas Fleet. They presented a paper on their findings to the Institution of Naval Architects in 1921.

In 1917, when the US entered the war, Goodall was seconded to the US Bureau of Construction and Repair, as a Constructor with rank Constructor Commander. He carried with him plans for many newer British designs, including for the early aircraft carrier HMS Hermes (95). He also brought with him battle damage analysis from the Battle of Jutland. For his work with the US he was awarded the American Navy Cross in 1918.

In 1919, Goodall returned to the Admiralty to work on the design of HMS Hood. The design was transformed from a pre-Jutland ship into a glorious G3 battlecruiser.

From 1925 to 1927, as a First Assistant Constructor, Goodall was in charge of battleship refits at Malta, enjoying the sport and social life.

He was promoted to Senior Constructor in 1927, and returned to DNC department.

In 1930, he was promoted to Chief Constructor and took on the modernisation of the elderly capital ships. This involved weapon trials against older battleships condemned by the London Naval Treaty.

In 1932, he was promoted to Assistant Director Naval Construction (ADNC). He led on small craft design, and then submarine design. He was awarded an OBE in May 1934, although he initially rejected it, as acceptance of an OBE by an assistant director would lower the prestige of the RCNC. However, he was forced to accept it, even though the controller of the Navy himself said, "That's a poor thing for a man in your position".

In July 1936, Sir Arthur Johns, then Director of Naval Construction (DNC) was forced to retire by ill-health. Goodall took on the role. The RCNC had been reduced in number, status and prospects between the wars. The ship building industry had declined with the depression between the wars. Goodall had a limited time to rebuild the skills and morale of the RCNC before World War II. His team were responsible for the design of a transformed fleet produced at an unparalleled rate, covering King George-V battleships, aircraft carriers, cruisers, destroyers, frigates, corvettes, amphibious craft and submarines.

Goodall was Director of Naval Construction (DNC) from 1936 to 1944, overseeing all Royal Naval designs leading up to and through World War II. He was appointed as CB (Commander of the Bath) in 1937, then KCB (Knight Commander of the Bath) in 1938.

Goodall retired in 1944. He became Honorary Vice President of the Royal Institution of Naval Architects. He was Prime Warden of the Worshipful Company of Shipwrights.

His obituary in The Times on 26 February 1965 was quite brief. It encouraged his successor as DNC, Sir Alfred Sims, to write to the paper published on 6 March 1965, stating:

"It is doubtful, however, whether his outstanding contribution to the strengthening of the Royal Navy at a critical time in the nation's history is sufficiently well known. He was Director of Naval Construction from 1936-1944, a period of office when there was undertaken - as the Board of Admiralty later told him - the production of war vessels upon a scale unparalleled in British Naval history. He brought his superb qualities as a designer and leader to the urgent production of the King George V class, Vanguard, the several Fleet, Light Fleet, and escort cruisers, Fiji, Swiftsure, Tiger and Dido class cruisers, and a large number of destroyers, frigates, corvettes, amphibious craft and other vessels. A deep sense of debt must be felt for all his achievements."

== Personal life ==
Goodall married Helen Phillips in 1908. She died in 1953. They had no children.

Goodall died in 1965.
