= Frank Grenier =

British Navy admiral (born 1934)

Rear-Admiral Frank Grenier CB
- Born: 27 August 1934 (age 92)
- Spouse: Jane Susan Bradshaw
- Military career
- Allegiance: United Kingdom
- Branch: Royal Navy
- Service years: 1952–1989
- Rank: Rear-Admiral
- Commands: HMS Ambush; HMS Valiant; HMS Churchill; 3rd Submarine Squadron; HMS Liverpool
- Conflicts: Falklands War
- Awards: Companion of the Order of the Bath
- Other work: Glass Engraver
- Website: grenier.co.uk/glass/

Rear-Admiral Peter Francis Grenier CB (born 27 August 1934) is a former Royal Navy officer who served as Flag Officer Submarines.

== Naval career ==
Educated at Montpelier School in Paignton and Blundell's School in Tiverton, Grenier joined the Royal Navy in 1952. He served as commanding officer of the submarine HMS Ambush in the Far East from 1964 to 1966. From 1968 to 1970 he was executive officer of the nuclear submarine HMS Resolution, a position for which it was a prerequisite to have fully qualified to command a nuclear submarine. Following his service in Resolution he was appointed commanding officer of the [Submarine] Commanding Officers Qualifying Course (COCOQC), a position known as 'Teacher', remaining in that position until serving as commanding officer of the nuclear submarine HMS Valiant from 1973 to 1975. In 1977 he was appointed commanding officer of the nuclear submarine HMS Churchill and also as Captain of the 3rd Submarine Squadron and in that role took part in the Queen's Silver Jubilee Fleet Review in June 1977. He went on to be commanding officer of the destroyer HMS Liverpool and the 3rd Destroyer Squadron in May 1981.

After that he became Captain of the Fleet, Home Fleet in October 1983, Chief of Staff Naval Home Command in December 1985 and Flag Officer Submarines in May 1987 before retiring in September 1989. He was appointed a Companion of the Order of the Bath on 17 June 1989.

Grenier is credited with having designed the 'dolphin badge' worn by qualified submariners in the Royal Navy. In retirement he became a glass engraver.

== Family ==
In 1957 Grenier married Jane Susan Bradshaw; they have two sons and one daughter.

Military offices
Preceded by Richard Heaslip	Flag Officer Submarines; 1987–1989	Succeeded by Sir John Coward
