= Arthur Johns (naval architect) =

British naval architect (1873-1937)

Sir Arthur William Johns, KCB, CBE (1873 – 13 January 1937) was a British naval architect. He served as Director of Naval Construction at the Admiralty from 1930 until July 1936, when he retired due to ill-health.

Johns was concerned with the building of the Antarctic ship Discovery, and of warships of all types, floating docks and airships. He is remembered as a pioneer of submarines, to whom the rapid evolution was largely due.

Johns rose to the top of his profession as Director of Naval Construction from 1930 to 1936.

He was made a Commander of the Order of the British Empire in 1920 and was admitted to the Order of the Bath as a Companion in 1929 and Knight Commander in 1933. He was also Vice-President of the Royal Institution of Naval Architects.

== Early life ==
Johns was born in Torpoint in 1873. He entered the Royal Dockyard, Devonport as a shipwright apprentice in 1887. In 1891 he won a scholarship to Royal Naval College, Keyham. A year later he proceeded to the Royal Naval College, Greenwich to train as a constructor in the Royal Corps of Naval Constructors. He left in 1895 with a First Class certificate in naval architecture.

== Career ==
His first posting as an Assistant Constructor in 1895 is not recorded. In 1898, Johns returned to Royal Naval College, Greenwich as an instructor in naval architecture.

After Greenwich, Johns joined the Department of Naval Construction in 1901 and work on the King Edward VII-class battleship.

In 1903, Johns worked for WE Smith as a junior designer for Captain Scott's Antarctic ship RRS Discovery.

From 1910 to 1912, Johns was the principal overseer for the Admiralty at the Thames Ironworks, Blackwall during the construction of HMS Thunderer, the last warship to be built on the Thames. HMS Thunderer took part on the Battle of Jutland in 1916.

His reputation was made by his submarine designs during the First World War. He was Head of Submarines from 1912. He was responsible for the design of 146 submarines across 10 classes.

After the First World War, John was promoted to Assistant Director responsible for aircraft carriers, destroyers, and once again submarines. It was for aircraft carriers that his term as Director of Naval Construction was known. There was rapid development from the first HMS Argus in 1918, through the first built for purpose carrier HMS Hermes completed in 1925. Three battlecruisers were converted to aircraft carriers in the mid 1920s: HMS Furious, HMS Courageous (50) and HMS Glorious. As a result the Royal Navy had 4 new 17,000 tons and 34 knot carriers from the late 1920s.

John's was promoted to Director of Naval Construction in 1930. New designs for the aircraft carriers HMS Ark Royal (commissioned in 1938) and HMS Illustrious (1940) provided the carrier force used by the Royal Navy for the Second World War.

In 1936, Johns retired due to ill-health. His successor was Stanley Vernon Goodall.

== Submarine design ==
John was head of the submarine section from 1912, claiming a number of notable 'firsts', though lack of enemy targets made their wartime history less well known than that of the German U-boats. For much of the war, the brunt was borne by 56 boats of the 'E' class, and later on, by the 'L' class derived from them.

'E' class submarines displaced 665 tons surfaced capable of 9 knots submerged using diesel-electric propulsion, serving in the North Sea and Baltic with an surface endurance of 3,000 nautical miles at 10 knots, and max surface speed of 17 knots. Group 1 and 2 were constructed before the war, launching between 1912 and 1915. Group 3 was launched between 1915 and 1916 achieving 10 knots submerged, with 5x18in torpedo tubes and a 12in gun.

The improved 'L' class, were larger with a displacement of 890 tons surfaced and speed of 10.5 knots submerged using diesel-electric propulsion. Group 1 came into commission in 1917, fitted with 6x18in torpedo tubes and a 12in gun. Surface endurance also increased to 3,800 nautical miles at 10 knots. Group 2 had improved 4x21in bow torpedo tubes combined with 2x18in beam tubes. Group 3 boats were not completed before the end of the war. But the development can be seen from the increase endurance of 4,500 nautical miles at 10 knots, increased armament of 6x21in bow torpedo tubes and 2x4in guns.

Considerable efforts were made to produce a fast submarine which could keep up with the battle fleet and operate in company with them. The first attempt was the 'J' class, which was still too slow for fleet work, largely due to the lack of a powerful, compact diesel engine.

The 'J' class was designed before the war, and reached commission in 1916. These larger vessels displaced 1,210 tons surfaced. They travelled at 19 knots on the surface and 9.5 knots submerged, using diesel-electric propulsion, with an surface endurance of 5,000 nautical miles at 12.5 knots.

Steam turbines were fitted to the ill-fated 'K' class. These very large, 338ft boats met the surface speed requirements of 23-24 knots, making them the fastest in the world for many years, but were cumbersome in handling, which led to several serious accidents. The design had been delayed until the 'J' class had been assessed Commissioned from 1917, the 'K' class displaced 1,980 tons surfaced with a range of 12,500 nautical miles at 10 knots. The design incorporated a large forecastle and deckhouse for surface transit.

A diesel-engined derivative, the 'M' class, carried a single 12in gun which could be fired with the boat submerged and only the end of the muzzle showing. In commission from 1920, the 'M' class displaced 1,594 tons surfaced with a range of 4,500 nm at 10 knots (or 2000nm at 15 knots). This was materially less than the 'K' class.

In 1915, designs incorporated MacTaggart Scott designs for telemotor systems that could remotely operate values, periscopes and wireless masts. This saved on manpower.

Smaller 'H' class were purchased from neutral US. The next Royal Navy design, the 'R' class, was a radical advance on previous submarines but incorporated some mechanical ideas from the 'H' class. A large

== Aircraft carrier design ==
It was for aircraft carriers that his term as Director of Naval Construction was known. The Royal Navy went through a period of rapid development.

HMS Argus was commissioned in 1918, with a full length flight deck above a single level hangar. Aircraft were transported between the decks using two lifts.

HMS Furious was converted from a battlecruiser into an aircraft carrier, along with her sister ships HMS Courageous (50) and HMS Glorious in the mid 1920s. These ships had two separate flight decks. The forward flight deck was accessed from the front of the upper hangar and was used for flying off. The rear flight deck was used for recovery. There were two hangar decks.

HMS Hermes was the first designed for purpose aircraft carrier, completed in 1925. She had a full length flight deck, with an island on the starboard side. She had a single hangar. Arresting gear was adopted. Two aircraft lifts were incorporated. This configuration went to sea in 1920/21.

HMS Ark Royal designs began in 1931. This design was finalised in 1934, in practice carrying 50-60 aircraft rather than the planned 72 aircraft, incorporating a single level flight deck as upper strength deck, a double level hangar with armour below the lower hangar deck. In practice the ship carried 50 to 60 aircraft. Ark Royal was sunk by a single torpedo in November 1941 in the Mediterranean Sea. One engine room and boiler room flooded immediately, resulting a significant heel. Power and propulsion were lost. After an extended period, the ship capsized and sank. The Bucknill Committee inquiry recommended improvements to bulkhead and boiler intakes to reduce the risk of flooding.

HMS Illustrious (87) class was materially different. There was a single hangar, practice carrying 36-57 aircraft. The flight deck, the hangar deck and the hangar bulkheads were all armoured. The hull depth (keel to flight deck) was materially lower than that on the Ark Royal, even though the size was similar at 23,000 tons. The armoured protection proved useful in withstanding kamikaze attacks in 1945.

== Class Designs (in commission) ==
- L-class submarines (1913). Naval architect/chief constructor: A Johns (citation).
- J-class submarines (1916). Naval architect/chief constructor: A Johns.
- British K-class submarines (1917). Naval architect/chief constructor: A Johns.
- British M-class submarines (1920). Naval architect/chief constructor: A Johns.
- British R-class submarines (1918). Naval architect/chief constructor: A Johns.
- Odin-class submarines (1929). Naval architect/chief constructor: A Johns.
- HMS Ark Royal (91) aircraft carrier (1938). Naval architect/chief constructor: WAD Forbes.
- HMS Illustrious-class aircraft carriers (1940). Naval architect/chief constructor: WAD Forbes.

== Personal life ==
He died on 13 January 1937 aged 62 and is buried in Putney Vale Cemetery, south west London.
