= William G Sanders =

William George Sanders, CB, CEng, RCNC (born 1936) is a naval architect for the Royal Navy. He rose to be Director General Submarines and Head of the Royal Corps of Naval Constructors (1986–-91).

== Early life ==
Sanders joined the Royal Dockyard, Devonport as an electrical apprentice in 1952. In 1956, he won a prestigious cadetship to the Royal Corps of Naval Constructors. He spent a year at the Royal Naval Engineering College, Keyham, before completing the naval architecture course at Royal Naval College, Greenwich. He then undertook his sea-time with the Far East Fleet.

== Career ==
In 1961, Sanders began his career as an Assistant Constructor in the ventilation and air conditioning specialist section in Bath. In 1963, he joined the Dreadnought Project Team (DPT). He worked on the SSN0X concept design, which became the Swiftsure-class submarine. In 1965, Sanders was promoted to Constructor and headed the team supporting the construction of the Oberon-class submarines, for the Royal Navy, Canada and Australia. In 1968, Sanders spent two years in uniform as a Constructor Commander as the Fleet Constructor Officer in Portsmouth. He returned to Bath and worked on support on in-service submarines.

In 1975, Sanders was promoted to Chief Constructor in charge of future nuclear submarine designs. Sanders began the SSN0Z/FOSSN/SSN20 concept designs for the follow-on to the Trafalgar-class submarines. From 1977 to 1979, Sanders was Principal Naval Overseer on the Clyde. During this period, Batch 1 & 2 Type 22 frigates were under construction at Yarrows. He was then seconded to Marconi Space and Defence Systems, to assist with the design of the Stingray and Tigerfish torpedoes. In 1981, Sanders returned to Bath on promotion to Assistant Director responsible for new design and major refits for surface ships. In this role he was Project Director for the Type 23 frigate.

In 1983, Sanders was promoted and appointed Director General Future Material Projects (DGFMP). Sander restarted work on the follow on SSN project to replace the Trafalgar class, by then referred to as SSN20. In 1985, Sanders became Director General Submarines. Sanders was in favour of a value for money improvement to the Trafalgar class. He understood that the defence staff were looking for maximum improvements in performance for SSN20, but this would increase costs substantially. The project moved towards approval of a Naval Staff Requirement in 1989/90. However, with the fall of the Soviet Union the project was put on hold. Sanders continued as Director General Submarines until 1991, when he took early retirement.

Sanders was awarded a CB in the 1991 Birthday Honours list.
