= Ted Horlick =

British Royal Navy officer (1925–2021)

Vice-Admiral Sir Ted Horlick KBE FREng FIMechE
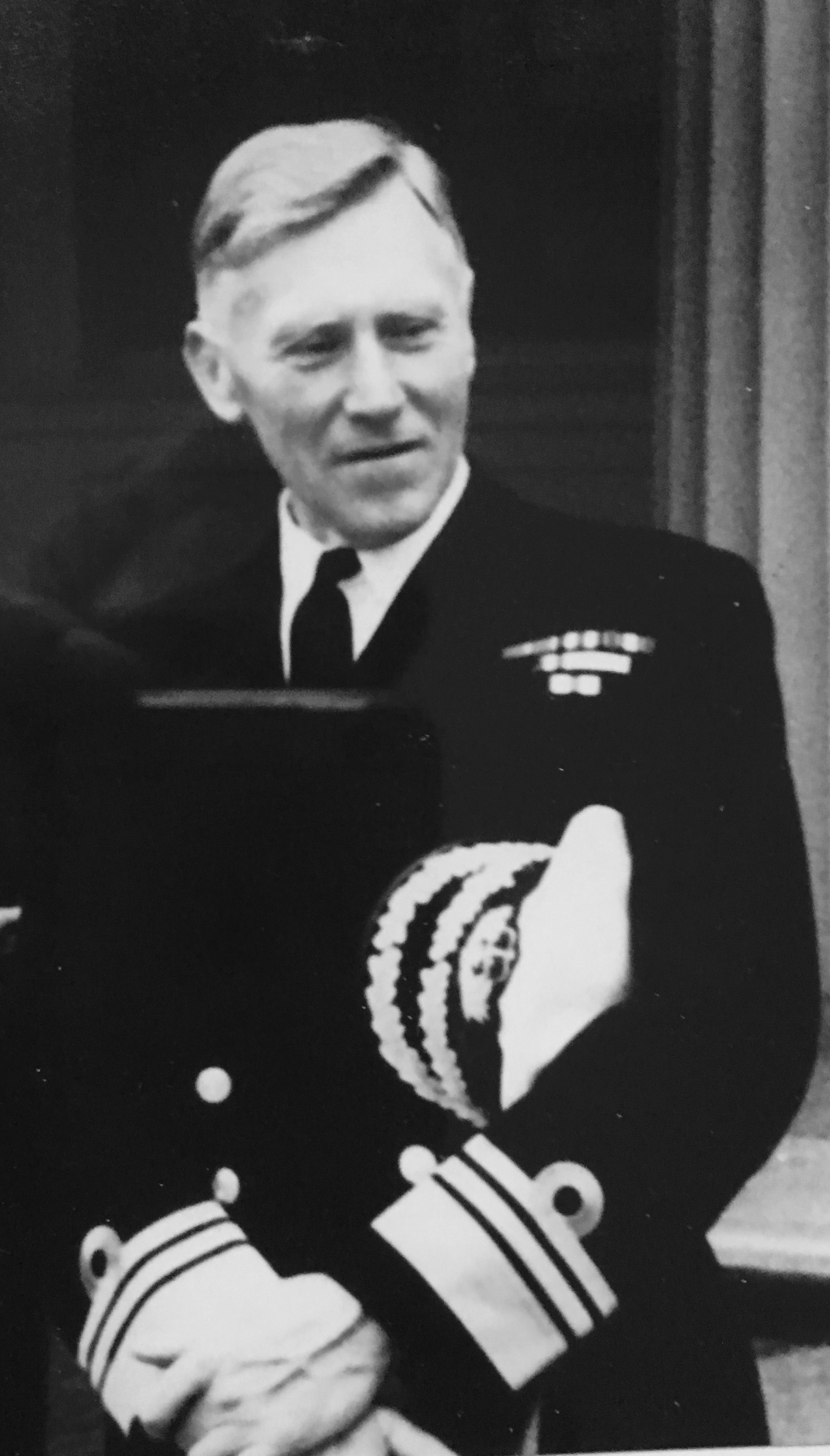
- Born: 28 September 1925
- Died: 12 November 2021 (aged 96)
- Military career
- Allegiance: United Kingdom
- Branch: Royal Navy
- Rank: Vice-Admiral
- Awards: KBE

Vice-Admiral Sir Edwin John Horlick KBE FREng FIMechE (28 September 1925 – 12 November 2021) was a British Royal Navy officer who served as Director General Ships from 1979 to 1983, and as Chief Naval Engineer Officer from 1981 to 1983.

== Career ==
Edwin John Horlick was born on 28 September 1925. He was educated at Bedford Modern School.

Horlick joined the Royal Navy in 1943. He was Squadron Engineering Officer in the 2nd Frigate Squadron (1960–63) before joining the Ship Department at the Ministry of Defence (1963–66).

Horlick was First Assistant to the Chief Engineer at HM Dockyard, Singapore between 1966 and 1968 and Assistant Director of Submarines between 1969 and 1972. He completed the Senior Officer’s War Course in 1973 and thereafter was Fleet Marine Engineering Officer, Staff of Commander-in-Chief of the Fleet between 1973 and 1975.

Horlick attended the Royal College of Defence Studies in 1976 and was later made Director of the Project Team for Submarine/Polaris between 1977 and 1979. Promoted to vice-admiral on 27 September 1979, he was Director General Ships between 1979 and 1983. In 1982 Sir Ted delivered a paper on Submarine Propulsion in the Royal Navy at the fifty-fourth Thomas Lowe Gray Lecture delivered to the Institution of Mechanical Engineers in London on 26 January 1982.

Horlick was Chief Naval Engineer Officer between 1981 and 1983. He was invested KBE in the 1981 Birthday Honours.

== Personal life ==
Horlick married Jean Margaret Covington who predeceased him; they had four sons. He died on 12 November 2021, at the age of 96.
