= Admiralty administration =

This article describes the administration of the British Admiralty. As of 1911, it consisted of the following branches and officers.

== Department of the Controller ==
Spending branches are in the department of the controller, and it will be well, while we are dealing with the material side of the Royal Navy, to describe briefly their character and duties.

The civil branches of the navy tributary to the controller are those of the director of naval construction, the engineer-in-chief, the directors of naval ordnance, of dockyards and of stores, and the inspector of dockyard expense accounts. The first duty of the controller is, as has been explained, in relation to the design and construction of ships and their machinery, and the executive officials who have charge of that work are the director of naval construction and the engineer-in-chief, whose operations are closely interrelated.

A vast administrative stride has been made in this particular branch of the admiralty. The work of design and construction now go forward together, and the admiralty designers are in close touch with the work in hand at the dockyards. This has been largely brought about by the institution, in 1883, of the Royal Corps of Naval Constructors.

== Royal Corps of Naval Constructors ==
The Royal Corps of Naval Constructors, whose members interchange their duties between the designing of ships at the admiralty and practical work at the dockyards.

It is through the Director of Naval Construction that many of the spending departments are set in motion, since he is responsible both for the design of ships and for their construction.

It deserves to be noticed, however, that a certain obscurity exists in regard, to the relative duties of the director of naval construction and the director of dockyards touching constructive works in the yards. The former officer has also charge of all the work given out to contract, though it is the business of the dockyard officials to certify that the conditions of the contract have been fulfilled.

In all this work the director of naval construction collaborates with the engineer-in-chief, who is an independent officer and not a subordinate, and whose procedure in regard to machinery closely resembles that adopted in the matter of contract-built ships.

== Director of Naval Ordnance ==
The Director of Naval Ordnance is another officer of the Controller's Department whose operations are very closely related to the duties of the Director of Naval Construction, and the relation is both intimate and sustained, for in the Ordnance department everything that relates to guns, gun-mountings, magazines, torpedo apparatus, electrical fittings for guns, and other electrical fittings is centred.

A singular feature of this branch of administration is that the navy long since lost direct control of ordnance matters, through the duties connected with naval gunnery, formerly in the hands of the Master-General of the Ordnance, and those of the Board of Ordnance which is a department common to the sea and land services which was vested in the Secretary of State for War from 1855. A more satisfactory state of things has grown up through the appointment of the director of naval ordnance, taking the place of the naval officer who formerly advised the director of artillery at the War Office.

Expenditure on ordnance has also been transferred from the army to the navy estimates, and a Naval Ordnance Store Department has been created. It cannot be said that the condition is yet satisfactory, nor can it be until the navy has control of and responsibility for its own ordnance. The Assistant-Director of Torpedoes is an officer instituted at the Admiralty within recent years, and his duty is to assist the director of naval ordnance in all torpedo matters.

== Director of Dockyards ==
The director of dockyards replaced the surveyor of dockyards in 1885, at about which time the inspector of dockyard expense accounts was instituted. It is upon the director of dockyards (q.v.) that the responsibility of the controller devolves in regard to the management of dockyards and naval establishments at home and abroad, and to the performance of work in these estab lishments, ship and boat building, maintenance, repairs and refits.

In this department the programme for work in the dockyards is prepared, as well as certain sections of the navy estimates.

== Stores Department ==
The Stores Department has the director of stores as its chief. This officer, about the year 1869, took over the storekeeping duties previously vested in the storekeeper-general.

The Naval Store Department is charged with the custody and issue of naval, as distinguished from victualling and ordnance stores, to be used in naval dockyards and establishments for the building, fitting and repairing of warships. It has, however, no concern with stores that belong to the Department of Works.

The business of the director of stores is also to receive and issue the stores for ships of all classes in commission and reserve, and he deals with a vast array of objects and materials necessary for the fleet, and with coals and coaling. He frames the estimates for his department, but his purchases are made through the director of navy contracts.

In practice the main business of the Stores Department is to see to the provision of stores for the navy, and to the proper supply of these at all the establishments, and for this purpose its officials direct the movements of storeships, and arrange for the despatch of colliers, the director being charged to be careful to provide for His Majesty's ships on foreign stations, and for the necessary supplies to foreign yards.

Another important business of the director of stores is the examination of the store accounts of ships as well as some other accounts. Although the director of stores is really in the department of the controller, he is supervised in regard to the coaling of the fleet by the junior naval lord.

The inspector of dockyard expense accounts has been alluded to. He is the officer charged with keeping a record of expenditure at the dockyards and of supervising expense accounts.

== The spending of money within the Controller's Department. ==
It may be useful to add a note concerning the spending of the money.

Within the controller's department, as has been explained, are centred the more important spending branches of the admiralty. While the work of design-tuning ships and preparing plans is in progress, the director of stores, the director of dockyards and other officials of that department concerned are making preparation for the work. The necessary stores, comprising almost every imaginable class of materials, are brought together, and the director of stores is specially charged to obtain accurate information in regard to requirements.

He is not, however, a purchasing officer, that work being undertaken by the director of navy contracts, who is concerned with the whole business of supply, except in regard to hulls and machinery of ships built by contract, and the special requirements of the director of works.

At the same time, the civil departments of the admiralty being held responsible for the administration of the votes they compile, it is their duty to watch the outlay of money; and to see that it is well expended, the accountant-general being directed to assist them in this work. The system is closely jointed and well administered, but it possesses a very centralized character, which interferes to some extent with flexible working, and with the progress of necessary repairs, especially in foreign yards.

Insofar as ships given out to contract are concerned (and the same is the case in regard to propelling machinery built by contract), the director of navy contracts plays no part, the professional business being conducted through the controller of the navy, who is advised thereon by the director of naval construction and the engineer-in-chief. The work conducted in private establishments is closely watched by the admiralty officials, and is thoroughly tested, but, mutatis mutandis, the system in regard to contract-built ships is practically the same as that which prevails in the dockyards.

== Account-General's Department (Naval Finance) ==
Naval Finance: The Accountant-General's Department. The subject of naval finance is one of great complexity and of vast importance. The large sums of money with which the admiralty deals in the way of both estimates and expenditure, amounting recently to about 30,000,000 annually, implies the existence of the great organization which is found in the department of the accountant-general of the navy.

Under the authority of the first lord, the parliamentary and financial secretary is responsible for the finance of the admiralty in general, and for the estimates and the expenditure, the accounts and the purchases, and for all matters which concern the relations of the admiralty to the treasury and to other departments of the government; and in all the practical and advisory work the accountant-general is his officer, acting as his assistant with the director of naval contracts who, under the several lords, is concerned with the business of purchase.

The organization of the accountant-general's department has undergone many changes, and the resulting condition is the outcome of various modifications which have had for their purpose.

== See also ==
- British Admiralty
