= Charles Lillicrap =

British naval architect (1887-1966)

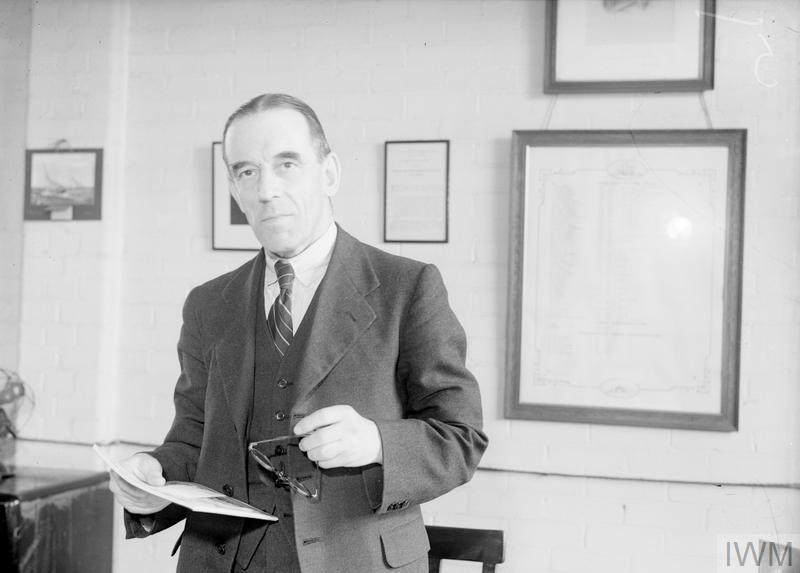
Lillicrap in 1945

Sir Charles Swift Lillicrap, KCB, MBE (12 November 1887 – 17 June 1966) was a British naval architect. He is best known for his cruiser designs during the 1920s. A member of the Royal Corps of Naval Constructors, he was Director of Naval Construction from 1944 to 1951.

During the First World War, he served as secretary on the Landship Committee, chaired by Sir Eustace Tennyson-d'Eyncourt, then Director of Naval Construction, for which he received an MBE in 1918.

== Early Life ==
Lillicrap was born in Devonport, studying at Stoke School. He entered the Royal Dockyard, Devonport, as a shipwright apprentice at the age of 14. He won a prestigious cadetship to join the Royal Corps of Naval Constructors in 1906, following in the footsteps of his father. He spent one year at the Royal Naval Engineering College, Keyham. He went on to complete the three-year naval architecture at the Royal Naval College, Greenwich. He left in 1910 with First Class certificate.

== Career ==
Lillicrap began his career as an Assistant Constructor in Devonport Dockyard in 1910. In 1913, he spent a year at sea on the battleship HMS Superb. He arrived at the Director of Naval Construction department in 1914. During the First World War, Lillicrap worked predominantly on urgently required monitors. He took over the work on the Abercrombie class, using available 12-inch (305 mm) guns. These were followed by the Lord Clive, Marshal Ney, Erebus, and Roberts-class monitors, all using 15-inch (381 mm) guns. By the end of the war 35 ships had been built across six different designs.

In 1917 Lillicrap was promoted to Constructor, and began his long association with cruiser designs. In the 1921, he made his name with the design of the mine laying cruiser HMS Adventure.

Lillicrap was appointed as lecturer at Royal Naval College, Greenwich in 1921, teaching the naval architecture course. In 1922, Lillicrap returned to the cruiser section at DNC. These cruisers were all designed under rigorous limitations on tonnage and gun calibre imposed by the Washington Naval Treaty of 1922. He designed the 13 County-class heavy cruisers of 1924, the York-class heavy cruiser of 1927, and the Leander-class light cruiser of 1931.

In 1930 Lillicrap carried out a detailed study of welding, then a comparatively new technology. He became a zealous advocate of its use in shipbuilding. He gave the paper 'The uses of electric arc welding in naval construction' to INA on the topic in 1933. Welding was used widely in the Arethusa-class cruiser design. Lillicrap recorded that the extensive welding of the bow saved 250 tons compared to the original specification.

In 1936, Lillicrap was promoted to Assistant Director of Naval Construction, with responsibility for submarines in addition to cruisers. In 1942, Lillicrap was promoted to Deputy Director of Naval Construction, taking responsibility for capital ships, including the last of them, HMS Vanguard. In 1944, he was promoted to Director of Naval Construction. He continued in this role until his retirement in 1951.

Lillicrap was appointed CB in 1944 and KCB in 1947 (Knight Commander of the Bath).

After his retirement from the Admiralty, Lillicrap became a director of J. Samuel White & Co., the Island Transport Company, Henry Barrister Ltd, and Marinite. Lillicrap was Vice President of the Royal Institution of Naval Architects from 1945 to 1955. He President of the Institute of Welding from 1956 to 1958. Lillicrap was a liveryman of the Worshipful Company of Shipwrights, and its prime warden in 1958.

== Cruiser design ==
In 1917 Lillicrap was promoted to Constructor, and began his long association with cruiser designs. In the 1921, he made his name with the design of HMS Adventure, a mine laying cruiser.

In 1922, Lillicrap returned to the cruiser section at DNC. He designed the County-class heavy cruiser. The class is notable for an appreciation of the increasing air threat, with the 4-inch (102 mm) anti-aircraft guns and 2-pounder pom-poms. The first sub-class was the Kent class of 1924, a 10,000-ton cruiser with eight 8-inch (203 mm) guns and four 4-inch AA guns, protected by a 4.5-inch (110 mm) main armour belt. The London class of 1926 an additional four 4-inch AA guns were added, the external bulges were removed and the length increase marginally resulting in an increase in the speed of 3/4 knot (1.4 km/h; 0.86 mph). The final Norfolk class of 1927 had lowered bridges and after superstructures, new 8-inch mountings and 4-inch guns relocated to avoid obstructing the catapult and aircraft.

Lillicrap followed these with the York-class heavy cruiser of 1927, a reduced 8,500-ton design with a reduced armament of six 8-inch guns (down from eight 8-inch guns on the County class), and using a new Mark II mounting, protected by a reduced 3-inch (76 mm) main armour belt. HMS Exeter fought at the Battle of the River Plate with distinction. Lillicrap then move onto the Leander-class light cruiser of 1931. These 7,000-ton designs were armed with four 6-inch (152 mm) guns and four 4-inch AA guns, and with 3-inch main armour belt. HMS Ajax and HMNZS Achilles fought at the Battle of the River Plate with distinction.

Lillicrap used welding widely in the Arethusa-class light cruiser design of 1933. Lillicrap recorded that the extensive welding of the bow saved 250 tons compared to the original specification. The 5,200-ton designs were armed with six 6-inch guns and four 4-inch AA guns, protected by a 3-inch main armour belt. These cruiser proved to be very satisfactory during the Second World War service.

== Personal Life ==
Lillicrap married Harriet (Minnie) Shears in 1911. She predeceased him in 1961. They has two sons and one daughter. His personal papers were donated to the National Maritime Museum in 1970.
