= SAT Warren =

British naval architect (1925-2005)

Stanley Anthony Treleaven 'Tony' Warren, CB, RCNC (26/09/1925-28/09/2005) was a renowned naval architect for the Royal Navy. He rose to be Director Project Teams (Submarines) from 1979 to 1985.

== Career ==
As a Constructor, Warren worked at the Malta Dockyard on loan to Baileys in 1959, which took over running the dockyard from the Admiralty.

As a Chief Constructor, Warren was a Project Manager for the Invincible-class aircraft carrier during the design phase in the 1970s.

Warren was promoted to be Director Project Teams (Submarines) (DPT) in 1979. In 1980 the Trident programme was approved by Parliament. Warren set up the Trident Project team, with Brian Wall RCNC as Project Director and Charles Betts as Design Manager. A US/UK Project Office was set up at the Electric Boat yard at Groton, where the US Trident submarines were being built, with John Coles RCNC in residence. The preliminary design was completed and the Naval Staff Requirement was approved in 1983. The final design of the Vanguard-class submarines began in 1984, with the DPT taking the lead with the builders VSEL in close support.

Warren was awarded a CB in the 1984 New Year Honours List.

== Personal life ==
Warren was born in Wandsworth, London on 26th September 1925.

Warren was married to Sheila. They had one daughter and two sons.

Warren died on 28th September 2005 in Trowbridge.
