= Louis Rydill =

British naval architect (1922-2009)

Professor Louis 'Lou' Rydill, OBE, RCNC (16 Aug 1922 - 21 March 2009) was a naval architect and educator for the Royal Navy. He worked on the early nuclear submarine designs, and was project manager for the ill-fated CVA-01 aircraft carrier design. He was the first Professor of Naval Architecture at University College, London.

== Early life ==
Rydill was born in New York in 1922. He entered the Royal Dockyard, Devonport as an apprentice. He won a prestigious cadetship to the Royal Corps of Naval Constructors in 1942. He then studied at Royal Naval Engineering College, Keyham and the naval architecture course at Royal Naval College, Greenwich.

== Career ==
Rydill was appointed as an Assistant Constructor in 1946. He began his career researching hydrodynamics at the Admiralty Experiment Works, Haslar, making important advances in seakeeping and submarine control. His research included trying to catch a dolphin to study its motion in the towing tank. He worked on the motion of high-speed submarines, particularly during manoeuvring. This was difficult before the AEW Manoeuvring Tank was built. Rydill realised that curved models running on a straight path could be used to model submarines travelling on a curved path.

He apparently acted as a visiting lecturer on hydrodynamics to the naval architecture course at Greenwich. In 1959, he was awarded a gold medal by the Royal Institution of Naval Architects for his 1958 paper based on his work at Haslar, A Linear Theory for the Steered Motion of Ships in Waves.

In 1957, Rydill joined Dreadnought Project Team as the naval architect, with the rank of Constructor. He worked on the novel aspects of the project, in particular the design of the pressure hull. The pressure hull diameter was much greater than previous boats and posed difficult structural problems. Rydill wrote the definitive paper in 1958 on high stress/low cycle fatigue experienced by submarines. He also led on grafting the British 'front-end' onto the US reactor and propulsion 'back-end'. The entirely novel British 'front-end' incorporated a large conformal sonar array and a massive water-ram torpedo discharge system.

Rydill then moved onto the Valiant-class submarine design. This was the first fully British design. He was awarded an OBE for his work in 1962.

In 1962, Rydill was appointed as a Chief Constructor and as Project Manager for the CVA-01 aircraft carrier project. He worked on this project until its cancellation in 1967. He described his involvement in the project as "a losing battle against the constraints of a small carrier". He described the cancellation in 1967, after five years on the project lead as: "Cancellation was the happiest day of my life".

Rydill was Professor of Naval Architecture at University College London from 1967 to 1972. This was during a period of great change. The naval architecture course at Royal Naval College, Greenwich had to be moved after it was not given degree approval by the Council for National Academic Awards (CNAA). Professor RED Bishop of UCL suggested that his Department of Mechanical Engineering could set up a post-graduate school in Ship Dynamics. It was therefore Rydill's job to set up this new school and course. This was complicated by the practical issue of existing students at Greenwich finishing their course, whilst new students were joining UCL. Rydill's success is demonstrated by the world renowned MSc course in naval architecture, subsequently attended by students from more than 20 countries.

In 1972, Rydill returned to DPT as assistant director of Construction. He took responsibility for the ongoing Polaris and Swiftsure-class projects and the new Trafalgar-class project.

Following a reorganisation of the Ship Department in 1976, Rydill took on the role Director of Ship Designs and Engineering. He chaired the new Ship and Weapons Design Co-ordination Committee (SWDCOG).

Rydill retired from the MoD in 1981 and returned to UCL as Professor of Naval Architecture from 1981 to 1985.

Professor Rydill authored along with Professor Roy Burcher the seminal textbook on submarine design in 1995, Concepts in Submarine Design.

Rydill was a Fellow of the Royal Institution of Naval Architects, a Fellow of the Royal Academy of Engineering (1982) and Honorary Fellow of University College London (2008).

== Personal life ==
Rydill married Eve Newman in 1949. They had two daughters, who are both novelists. Rydill died in 2009, his wife survived him.

Noted for his high intelligence and analytical clarity of mind, Rydill was also a convivial and cultured man with many interests, including an enthusiasm for American music, particularly jazz.
