= William Berry (naval architect) =

British naval architect (1865-1937)

Sir William John Berry, KCB (1865 – 5 April 1937) was a British naval architect. A member of the Royal Corps of Naval Constructors, he was Director of Naval Construction (DNC) from 1924 to 1930. His reputation was made as Assistant Director in charge of cruiser design during the First World War. He followed this up by taking charge of warship production between the wars and then as DNC responsible for developing the post-war fleet.

== Early life ==
Berry was at Sheerness in 1865. After an apprenticeship at Royal Dockyard, Sheerness he won a prestigious cadetship to join the Royal Corps of Naval Constructors in 1884 to study naval architecture at Royal Naval College, Greenwich. He left in 1887 with a First Class Certificate, despite heavy competition from future Professor William Hovgaard and Admiral David W. Taylor USN.

== Career ==
Berry began his career as an Assistant Constructor in 1887. Berry had an unusually varied career, with long spells at the Royal Dockyards at Chatham, Devonport and Malta. He was appointed a Chief Constructor at Malta Dockyard in 1907.

Berry returned home in 1912 to become Assistant Director of Naval Construction. He was responsible for cruiser design during the First World War, for which he was awarded a CB in 1917. He was formally congratulated by their Lordships of the Admiralty for his work on the Renown-class battlecruiser. These were required by Admiral John Fisher as a very fast, lightly armoured battlecruiser in December 1914 and commissioned in September 1916.

In 1917, Berry became Director of Warship Production. He had the difficult task of agreeing financial terms to cancel a large number of build contracts, and to rationalise the armour-making industry. Between 1920 and 1923 Berry reorganised the overseeing service, which had previously been regarded as a 'temporary' role.

In 1924, Berry was promoted to Director of Naval Construction. He remained in that role until his retirement in 1930. During this time he was responsible for the transformation of the fleet with the new and small cruiser classes (County-class and York-class), replacement destroyers (V and W-class to A- and B-class) and improved submarines (Odin-class submarine).

He was promoted to Knight Commander of the Order of the Bath in the 1926 Birthday Honours.

== Personal life ==
Berry married Susannah Masters of Gillingham. They had two sons and one daughter. Berry died in 1937.
