= Director General Ships =

British Admiralty Senior Post (1958-1983)

The Director General Ship, or DG(Ships), was the senior post of the Ship Department of the Admiralty of the United Kingdom, reporting to the Controller of the Navy. It replaced the Director of Naval Construction post as the most senior role in ship design in 1958.

The modern equivalent is Director Ships in the Defence Equipment and Support organisation of the Ministry of Defence.

== Nihill committee ==
Naval construction had been under the control of the Director of Naval Construction since 1883. The importance of mechanical, electrical and weapons engineering had increased. The organisation required reform. There were post-war concerns about delays in the design and build of warships, the Whitby-class frigate.

In 1956, Lord Justice Barclay Nihill was appointed as chair of 'The Committee on the Organisation for handling the Admiralty's requirements in Materiel'. The committee considered four questions:

1. whether the Controller's organisation produced good ships and equipment,
2. whether it produced them economically,
3. whether it produced them quickly enough,
4. whether the organisation was subject to proper schedule and budget control.

David Brown describes the conclusions of the committee as:

"To the first, they found no clear answer, noting complaints from sea that layout was inferior to that of US ships, and complaints from inside the Controller's department that British equipments were inferior, bigger and heavier than American equivalents. They came out very strongly in support of the economy of the Controller's departments, showing that the task of design was carried out very much more cheaply and with fewer men in other countries. The main problem was in the time it took to get equipment into service. Part of the trouble was seen as the tendency of design departments to rise to a challenge to its ingenuity and hence to encourage the Naval Stagg in their ideas even to the extent of altering ships already under construction. In retrospect the committee may have had insufficient understanding of the nature of engineering design. The problems of layout, of delay and lack of control were at least partly due to the attend to carry out the work with a design staff which ere inadequate in numbers and lacking sufficient authority over inputs to the design."

The committee did recognise that the DNC's responsibility for co-ordinating all aspects of the design was not matched by any executive authority. The committee found that the way in which separate professional engineers had grown up in DNC, E-in-C or DEE departments:

"had bred a remarkable departmental esprit de corps which is the mainspring of the present organisation but which, at the same time, has had the unfortunate effect of making boundaries of the separate departments too watertight [and that] by concentrating professional and specialist knowledge has contributed to keep the RN, with slender resources, in the forefront of technology."

The principal recommendations were that the Controller should be in post for at least 5 years, and that the number of departments reporting to them should be drastically reduced. The old DNC, E-in-C and DEE departments were to be combined into a 'Ship Department' headed by a director general Ships:

"We regard it as necessary that the Head of the Department, the Director General, should be an officer with professional qualifications as a Naval Architect, Marine or Electrical Engineer and possessing breadth of outlook and administrative ability of a high order. Since the prime responsibility for the ship naturally falls on the Naval Architect, we regard it as most desirable that a Naval Architect should occupy this post - DG Ships must be primus inter pares among the other Directors General. We propose, therefore, that he should recognised as the principal technical adviser to the Board, as is the DNC at present."

In April 1958, Sir Alfred Sims was appointed Director General Ships designate to work out the new organisation. In October, the Ship Department was formed. It consisted of five main directorates: Naval Construction (DNC), Marine Engineering (DME), Electrical Engineering (DEE), Ship Production (DNSP), and Equipment (DNE).

The new department department occupied six of the seven block at Foxhill. Four 'ship' groups were created: Group A - Aircraft Carriers, Group B - Submarines, Group C - Cruisers, Depot Ships, Minesweepers, FPB etc., Group D - Destroyers and Frigates. Each group was occupied a block, and was made up of two DNC sections and one each from DME and DEE. A further two blocks held the six specialist groups: Hydrodynamics; Attack and Defence; Materials and Habitability; Main Machinery; Auxiliaries; Electrical High Power; and Electrical Low Power.

Sims closed the old DNC office in London, and moved to Foxhill, Bath.

The DG(Ships) role continued until 1983, when the Controller of the Navy decided to reorganise responsibilities. The separate Ship Department and Naval Weapons Departments were replaced with Warships and Weapons Equipment Departments, the latter covering weapons systems, machinery and other ship and submarine equipment. Pat Jarvis as DG(Ships) transmuted to Deputy Controller (Warships), and Rear Admiral Geoff Marsh was appointed Deputy Controller (Weapons Equipment).

== Office holders ==
- Sir Alfred Sims, RCNC (1958-67).
- Vice Admiral Sir George Raper (1968–1974).
- Reginald Daniel, RCNC (1974-79).
- Vice Admiral Sir Ted Horlick (1979-83).
- Pat Jarvis, RCNC (1983-86). Role transmuted to Deputy Controller(Warships)
