= Royal Corps of Naval Constructors =

Institution of the British Royal Navy

The Royal Corps of Naval Constructors (RCNC) is an institution of the British Royal Navy and Admiralty for training in naval architecture, marine, electrical and weapon engineering. It was established by Order in Council in August 1883, on the recommendation of the naval architect Sir William White. Its precursor was the Royal School of Naval Architecture, London.

According to the Royal Navy's Books of Reference 3 Chapter 46, it is a "civilian corps and an integrated part of the Defence Engineering & Science Group". Members in certain posts who do not hold commissions are eligible to wear a uniform similar to that of the Royal Navy and are accorded the same respect as commissioned officers.

== History ==
From Tudor times, the ships of the Royal Navy were built in the Royal Dockyards under the supervision of the Master Shipwright and to the design of the Surveyor of the Navy who was always an ex-Master Shipwright. In 1805, seeing the growing application of science in industry, Lord Barham's Commission recommended, that a School of Naval Architecture should be formed to produce men suitably trained both to design the ships of the fleet and to manage the work of the Royal Dockyards. This first school was created in 1811 at Portsmouth, the third school in South Kensington in 1863, which moved to the new Royal Naval College, Greenwich in 1873. Since 1975, the courses are offered at University College London.

The graduates of these schools were Naval Architects who quickly established high professional standards in the field. Their influence, combined with the effects of the Industrial Revolution led to the formation of the Institution (now the Royal Institution) of Naval Architects in 1860.

Although the number of professionally qualified Naval Architects employed in the design, building and repair of warships had risen to 27 by 1875, ships were still being designed and built against the Chief Constructor's advice and there were disasters. The main obstacle to progress was the poor career prospects of the professionally qualified Naval Architect with the linked difficulty of getting sufficient recruits. To solve these linked problems William White, then Professional Assistant to the Director of Naval Construction, proposed a co-ordinated training programme and career structure and these ideas were approved in 1882 by a committee under Lord Brassey.

The first head of the Royal Corps of Naval Constructors was Sir Nathaniel Barnaby. Due to illness he resigned in 1885 and Sir William White was appointed as his successor.

The professional Naval Architects of the Royal Corps had grown to 91 by 1901 and were heavily involved in the build-up to the First World War. The rapid and successful design and building of HMS Dreadnought in 1905–1906 was probably their best-known achievement of the time.

The Royal Corps had a flirtation with airship design between 1915 and 1922 but this was overshadowed by the conversion of ships to operate aircraft and the design and construction of the first purpose built ship to carry aircraft, HMS Hermes. The success of these ships, together with that of submarines and escorts designed by the Royal Corps, played a large part in establishing British naval supremacy.

The Second World War saw a similar expansion of the shipbuilding effort and the evacuation to Bath of the Director of Naval Construction. Many members of the Royal Corps served in uniform in the ranks up to the level of Constructor Rear-Admiral.

In the post-war period the major features have been the very considerable achievement in designing and maintaining a fleet of nuclear-powered submarines and the changing nature of the Royal Corps itself.

Recognising the increasing impact of a vessel's equipment on its hull and structure, the Royal Corps combined with the professional Electrical and Mechanical Engineers of the Royal Naval Engineering Service (RNES) in 1977. Further amalgamation with specialist weapons designers was also enacted. In the last decade this more diverse corps has been instrumental in the design and manufacture of the warships such as the Type 45 destroyer, Astute-class submarines and Queen Elizabeth-class aircraft carriers; all of which contain highly complex engineering systems.

The Royal Corps currently numbers nearly 100 naval architects, marine, electrical and weapon engineers and, in keeping with its original aims, continues to provide professional engineers for the design, building and maintenance of vessels of the Royal Navy.

Six naval constructors gave their lives in the course of duty. Arthur K. Stephens, Assistant Constructor Second Class, was lost on 31 May 1916 aboard the battlecruiser HMS Queen Mary which was sunk at the Battle of Jutland. F. Bailey and A.A.F. Hill were lost when the submarine HMS Thetis flooded during diving trials in June 1939. During the Second World War H. H. Palmer was lost when the SS Aguila was torpedoed and sunk by a U-boat while en route to Gibraltar for Dockyard duties in August 1941. F. Bryant was killed in the bombing of Bath in 1942 and R. King was killed in Mombasa.

== The RCNC and the Naval Service ==
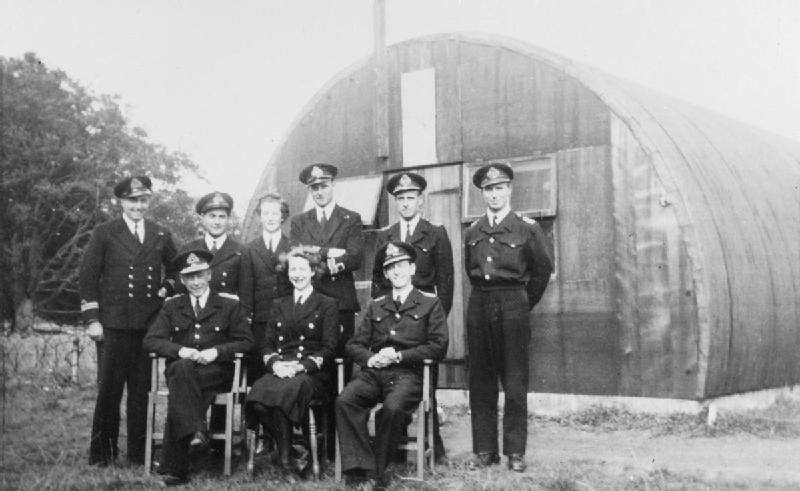
Engineer Rear Admiral Geoffrey Morgan and his technical staff during World War II, The two men on the right are a Constructor Captain (sitting) and a Constructor Lieutenant Commander (standing)

Some members of the RCNC are entitled to wear a modified version of the standard RN uniform, the difference being the presence of grey bands between gold stripes worn on the arms and on shoulder boards. Constructors may wear uniform in certain posts in UK establishments (predominantly naval bases) and in several overseas posts.

CNC Uniform Ranks
Civil Service Grade	Equivalent Rank	Rank to be used on RCNC uniforms	RCNC rank insignia
Band B1	No equivalent	Captain, RCNC	
Band B2	Captain, RN	Commander, RCNC	
Band C1	Commander, RN	Lieutenant Commander, RCNC	
Band C2	Lieutenant Commander, RN	Lieutenant, RCNC	
Defence Engineering and Science Group Graduate Engineer	No equivalent	Lieutenant, RCNC	

== Notable members ==
- Professor David Andrews. Professor of Naval Architecture, UCL. Leading advocate for building-block concept design of warships. Investigator of novel ship hull designs for naval application (Trimaran and SWATH).
- Jim Andrews. Electrical and Nuclear Engineer. Lead on first SSN refits at Chatham Dockyard. Director Submarine Projects in 1989, then in 1992 Principal Director Ship Refitting in Director General Ship Refitting (DGSR). Principal Director Fleet Support (DGSR) from 1993 to 1995.
- Roger Babington. Director General Ship Refitting (1993-1996). Chief Executive Ship Support Agency (1996-98). Managing Director of British Maritime Technology Services (BMTDSL) (1999-2001).
- Sir Rowland 'Rolly' Baker. Designer WW2 Landing Craft. Project Manager for Dreadnought submarine and Polaris class. Director Dreadnought Project Team, Director Polaris Team, Director Project Teams (1958-1968).
- Sir William Berry. Director Naval Construction (1924-30).
- Charles Betts. Director General Ships (1992-94). Director General Submarines (1994-98).
- David K. Brown. Deputy Chief Naval Architect (1982-88). Historian of RCNC. Author "A century of Naval Construction".
- Professor Roy Burcher. Structural design expert.
- Peter Chamberlain (naval architect). Deputy Controller (Warship Equipment) (1988). Head of Defence Research Agency (1989-92).
- John Coates (naval architect). Designer County-class destroyers. Chief Naval Architect (1977-79). Consultant naval architect of Greek Trireme project (1982-89).
- John Coles. Project Manager Vanguard-class submarines. Chief Executive Ship Support Agency and Warship Support Agency (1998-2005). Project Leader Queen Elizabeth-class aircraft carriers (2005-2007).
- Reginald 'Jack' Daniel. Designer Valiant-class submarines. Director General Ships (1974-79).
- W. J. A. Davies. England Rugby Union fly-half and captain (1913-23). On staff of Admiral Sir John Jellicoe in World War 1. Constructor Rear Admiral, Director of Merchant Ship Building & Repairs (1950).
- Professor Douglas Faulkner. Structures expert. John Elder Professor of Naval Architecture, Glasgow University.
- Keith Foulger. Head of US-based team, Dreadnought Submarine. Project Manager Valiant-class submarines. ADNC submarine projects. Director Naval Construction (1983-85).
- Geoff Fuller. Director of Naval Ship Production (DNSP) in 1982. Executive Chairman of Vickers Shipbuilding and Engineering (VSEL), 1986. Chair of Council, Royal Institution of Naval Architects.
- Dr Jonathan Gates. Electrical Engineering Lecturer and Visiting Professor, UCL. Lead advocate for systems approach to warship design. Type 45 PAAMS Integration Director.
- Professor John van Griethuysen. Hull designer Type 23. Professor of Naval Architecture, UCL.
- Norman Hancock. Designer Swiftsure-class submarines. Professor of Naval Architecture, Greenwich. Director, Warship Design (1969-76).
- Sir Arthur Johns. Designer early aircraft carriers (between WW1-WW2). Director Naval Construction (1930-36).
- Professor Andy Keane. Designer of original CONDES. Leading developer of design optimisation software. Professor of Computational Engineering at University of Southampton.
- Sir Charles Lillicrap. Designer of cruisers (between WW1-WW2). Welding innovator. Director Naval Construction (1944-51).
- Muir McDonald. Naval architect Type 24 submarine design. Managing Director, BMT Defence Services.
- Howard Mathers. Submarine refitter. Submarine Platform Authority/Director In-Service Submarines/Chief Engineer (1994-2009). DES Director of Safety & Engineering (2009-12). Babcock International's Technical Director (Submarines) (2012-).
- Sidney John Palmer. Hydrodynamicist, Haslar. Lead US delegations Polaris Project. Professor of Naval Architecture, Greenwich. Deputy Director General Ships (1968-73).
- Douglas, David, Dennis Pattison. Brother naval architects.
- Professor Kenneth Rawson. Co-author with Eric Tupper "Basic Ship Theory". Professor of Naval Architecture, UCL. Chief Naval Architect (1979-83). Professor of Design & Technology, Brunel University.
- Louis Rydill. Naval architect Dreadnought Submarine. Project Manager CVA01. Professor of Naval Architecture, UCL. Director of Ship Designs and Engineering (1976-81).
- William G Sanders CB. Director General Submarines (1985-91).
- WG Sanders MBE. Assistant & Deputy Director Naval Construction (World War 2).
- Sir Victor Shepheard. Project Manager battleships. Professor of Naval Architecture, Greenwich. DNC overseeing HMY Britannia. Director Naval Construction (1952-58).
- Sir Alfred Sims. Project Manager aircraft carriers. Professor of Naval Architecture, Greenwich. Director Naval Construction (1958-67).
- Alistair Stirling. Project Manager Astute-class submarines.
- Eric Tupper. AMTE(Human Factors). Co-author with Ken Rawson "Basic Ship Theory".
- SAT Warren CB. DPT/Director General Submarines (1979-85).
- Sir Philip Watts. DNC Dreadnought battleship development and build. Director Naval Construction (1902-12).
