= Director of Naval Construction =

British Admiralty senior post (1875-1958

Office of the Director of Naval Construction
- Ensign of the Royal Navy
- Admiralty Department, Ministry of Defence
- Member of: Board of Admiralty, Admiralty Board, Navy Board
- Reports to: Third Sea Lord
- Nominator: First Sea Lord
- Appointer: First Lord of the Admiralty, Secretary of State for Defence; Subject to formal approval by the Queen-in-Council
- Term length: Not fixed (typically 5–8 years)
- Inaugural holder: Isaac Watts
- Formation: 1860-1966

The Director of Naval Construction (DNC) also known as the Department of the Director of Naval Construction and Directorate of Naval Construction and originally known as the Chief Constructor of the Navy was a senior principal civil officer responsible to the Board of Admiralty for the design and construction of the warships of the Royal Navy. From 1883 onwards he was also head of the Royal Corps of Naval Constructors, the naval architects who staffed his department from 1860 to 1966.

The DNC's modern equivalent is Director Ships in the Defence Equipment and Support organisation of the Ministry of Defence.

== History ==
The post evolved from the office of the Assistant Surveyor of the Navy (1832–1859) In 1860 the Assistant Surveyor was renamed Chief Constructor the post lasted until 1875 when it was renamed to the Director of Naval Construction. The chief constructor was originally head of the Royal Corps of Naval Constructors and members of the corps were responsible for the designing and building of warships, whether they were built in the Royal Dockyards (such as Chatham) or contracted out to private industry (such as Armstrong Whitworth). The Director was a naval architect as well as a manager. Work in the dockyards was covered to some extent by the two posts of Director of Naval Construction and the separately held Director of Dockyards. The latter's officers were responsible for checking that work contracted out by the former was being undertaken correctly. In designing warships the Director of Naval Construction had to work with the Department of the Engineer-in-Chief, another Admiralty post, which existed from 1847 to 1889.

In 1958 following restructuring within the Admiralty this department as a wholly independent function ceased and it became a sub-division within a new larger Ship Department under the control of a Director General, Ships until 1964 when the Admiralty department was abolished and replaced by a new Ministry of Defence. The Engineer-in-Chief post arose after the adoption of steam engines for propulsion. The French Navy had a similar post, Directeur des Construction Navales.

== Post holders ==
Included:
Chief Constructors

- Isaac Watts (1860–1863)
- Sir Edward James Reed (1863–1870)
- Sir Nathaniel Barnaby (1870–1875)

Directors of Naval Construction

- Sir Nathaniel Barnaby (1875–1885)
- Sir William Henry White (1885–1902)
- Sir Philip Watts (1902–1912)
- Sir Eustace Tennyson d'Eyncourt (1912–1924)
- Sir William Berry (1924–1930)
- Sir Arthur Johns (1930–1936)
- Sir Stanley V. Goodall, KCB, OBE, RCNC (1936–1944)
- Sir Charles S. Lillicrap (1944–1951)
- Sir Victor Shepheard (1951–1958)

== Department structure ==
As of April 1915:

- Director of Naval Construction
  - Assistant Director of Naval Construction
  - Superintendent of Construction Accounts and Contract Work
    - Superintendent of Admiralty Experiment Works
      - Chief Constructor
      - Curator of Drawings
      - Examiner of Constructing Accounts
      - Inspecting Officer of Smiths Works
    - Superintending Electrical Engineer

As of October 1916:

- Director of Naval Construction
  - Assistant Director of Naval Construction
  - Superintendent of Construction Accounts and Contract Work
    - Senior Constructive Officer
      - Chief Constructor
    - Superintending Electrical Engineer
    - Inspecting Officer of Smiths' Work

As of April 1917:

- Director of Naval Construction
  - Deputy Director of Naval Construction
    - Assistant Director of Naval Construction
    - Superintendent of Construction Accounts and Contract Work
      - Superintendent of Admiralty Experiment Works
        - Chief Constructor
        - Superintending Electrical Engineer
          - Examiner of Electrical Accounts
        - Curator of Drawings
        - Inspecting Officer of Smiths' Work

As of November 1918:

- Director of Naval Construction
  - Deputy Director of Naval Construction
    - Assistant Director of Naval Construction
      - Superintendent of Admiralty Experiment Works
        - Chief Constructor
        - Inspecting Officer of Smiths' Work
        - Inspecting Officer of Ship Fitting Work

== Departments under the office ==
- Naval Construction Research Establishment, (NCRE), (1943–58)
- Admiralty Experimental Works Haslar
- Office of the Assistant Director Naval Construction
- Office of the Deputy Director Naval Construction
- Royal Corps of Naval Constructors
- Superintendent of Construction Accounts and Contract Work

== Timeline ==
- Board of Admiralty, Surveyor of the Navy, Assistant Surveyor of the Navy, 1832–1859
- Board of Admiralty, Controller of the Navy, Chief Constructor, 1860–1875
- Board of Admiralty, Director of Naval Construction, 1875–1958
- Board of Admiralty, Director-General, Ship Department, Director Naval Construction Division, 1959–1964

== See also ==
- Admiralty administration
