= Alfred Sims =

British naval architect (1907-1977)

Sir Alfred 'Jack' Sims, KCB, OBE, RCNC (11 October 1907 to Sept 1977) was a renowned naval architect for the Royal Navy. He worked on submarine design and building between World War 1 and World War 2. He led post-World War 2 aircraft carrier design. He was the Director General Ships from 1958 to 1967.

== Early life ==
Alfred Sims was born at Revelstoke near Plymouth on 11 October 1907. He entered the Royal Dockyard, Devonport as an electrical apprentice at the age of 15. He transferred to the shipwright branch in 1925. At the end of his 4-year apprenticeship, he won a cadetship in Royal Corps of Naval Constructors and subsequently graduated from Royal Naval College, Greenwich with a First Class certificate in naval architecture and a reputation for exceptionally hard work.

== Career ==
In 1929, Sims began his career with 4 years as an Assistant Constructor at Royal Dockyard, Chatham, where he contributed to the development of welding technology. He worked on submarine building in Chatham, beginning a life-long relationship with them, reinforced when he joined the Admiralty to work on the design of the British T-class submarines.

Sims joined the staff of Rear Admiral Submarines in 1938, as a Constructor Lieutenant Commander. He worked on the staff of Max Horton. When Horton was promoted to CINC-Western Approaches in 1942, Sims accompanied him and was promoted to Constructor Commander. For his work he was appointed OBE in 1943.

Sims moved back to the Admiralty in 1943, and worked on auxiliary vessels, and also on the development of air conditioning for RN vessels.

In 1947, Sims became Professor of Naval Architecture at Royal Naval College, Greenwich.

On his return to Bath, he was Chief Constructor for aircraft carriers, and then Assistant Director Naval Construction responsible for aircraft carriers and submarines.

Sims was appointed Director General (Ships) from 1958 to 1967. This was the new role with the reorganised Ship Department. DG (Ships) was to head the Ship Department, comprising Naval Construction (DNC), Marine Engineering (DME), Electrical Engineering (DEE), Ship Production (DNSP), and Equipment (DNE). Sims closed the old DNC in London, and moved to Foxhill, Bath.

He was made KCB in 1960 (Knight Commander of the Bath).

Sims retired in 1967. In 1972, he was chosen unanimously by the council to be the President of the Royal Institution of Naval Architects, a post he held for 3 years.

== Personal life ==
Sims died in 1977. His memorial service was held at St-Lawrence-in-jury-next-Guildford 13 October 1977.
