= HMS Valiant (S102) =

1966 Valiant-class nuclear-powered fleet submarine of the Royal Navy

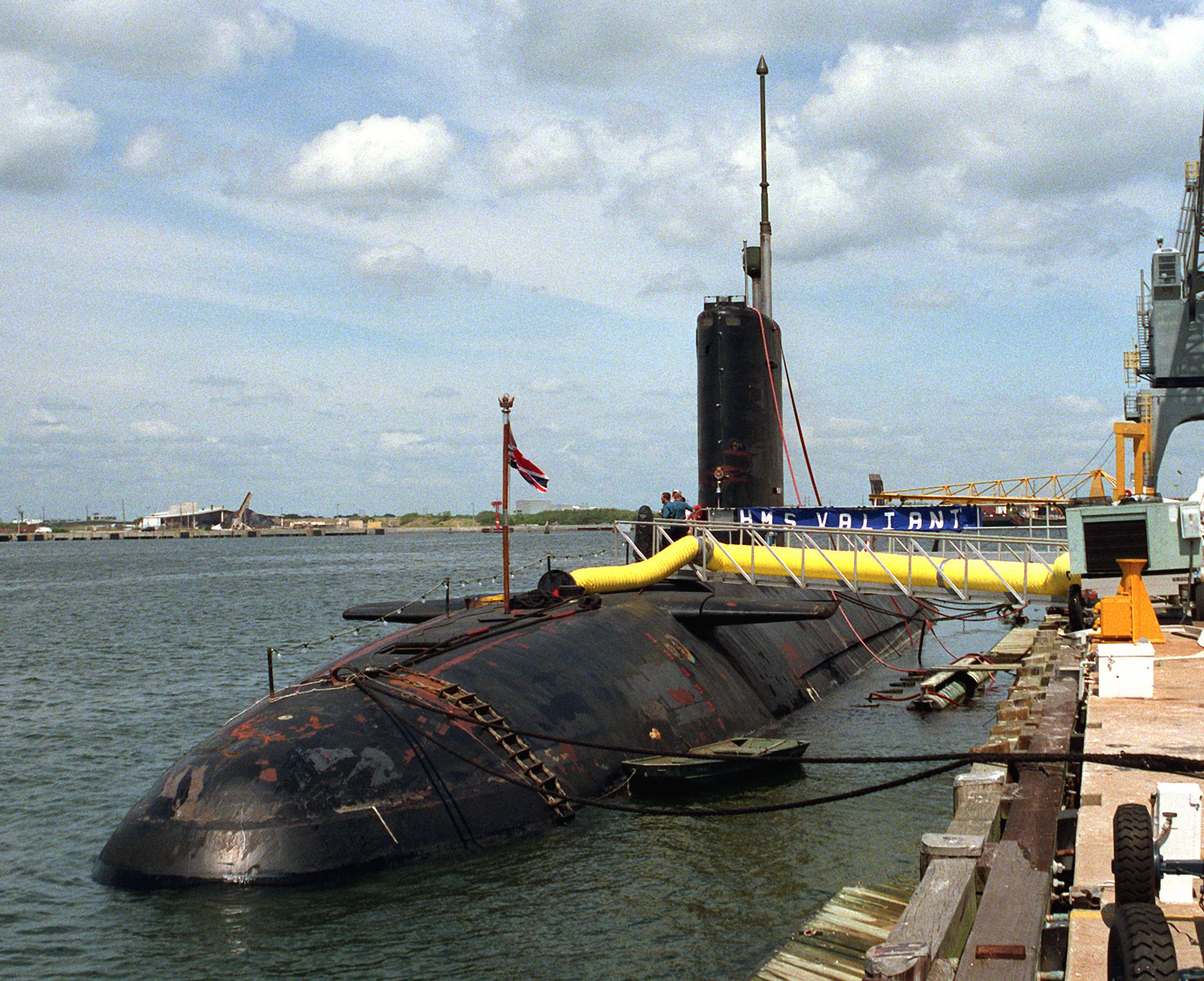
- Valiant in Florida in April 1994

History

United Kingdom
- Name: Valiant
- Ordered: 31 August 1960
- Builder: Vickers-Armstrongs
- Laid down: 22 January 1962
- Launched: 3 December 1963
- Commissioned: 18 July 1966
- Decommissioned: 12 August 1994
- Status: Laid up
- Badge

General characteristics
- Class & type: Valiant-class submarine
- Displacement: 4,200 long tons (4,267 t) surfaced; 4,900 long tons (4,979 t) submerged
- Length: 285 ft (87 m)
- Beam: 33 ft 3 in (10.13 m)
- Draught: 27 ft (8.2 m)
- Propulsion: 1 × Rolls-Royce pressurised water reactor; 2 × English Electric steam turbines, 15,000 hp (11 MW); 2 × Paxman diesel-electric generator; 1 shaft
- Speed: 20 knots (23 mph; 37 km/h) surfaced; 28 knots (32 mph; 52 km/h) submerged
- Range: Unlimited, except by food supplies
- Complement: 116
- Armament: 6 × 21 inch (533 mm) bow torpedo tubes

The sixth and most recent HMS Valiant was the second of Britain's nuclear-powered submarines, and the first of the two-unit Valiant class.

== Construction ==
She was ordered on 31 August 1960 and laid down 22 January 1962 at Vickers-Armstrongs in Barrow-in-Furness. The basic design concept was to use the forward design of Dreadnought together with an aft end consisting of all British nuclear machinery based on the Dounreay prototype.

She was launched on 3 December 1963 by Lady Thorneycroft, and finally entered service 18 July 1966.

== Operational history ==
She was refitted in 1970, 1977 and 1989.

In 1977 Valiant was trailing a Soviet submarine in the eastern Mediterranean when she suffered a salt water pipe leak, which flooded the reactor compartment with sea water. The reactor was shut down and the compartment pumped dry and after a clean-up of the compartment, the reactor was taken under power again. Valiant took part in the Falklands War in 1982, arriving in the war zone on 17 May. She transmitted more than 300 early air-warning alerts and spent 101 days on patrol off Argentina's Patagonian coast. On 23 May, Valiant suffered minor damage while submerged off Rio Grande when an Argentine fighter coming back from a mission jettisoned its bombs near the submarine in order to secure a safe landing.

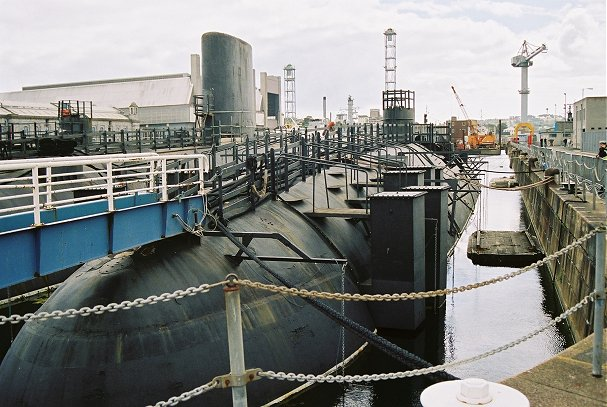
Valiant at HMNB Devonport Navy Days on 26 August 2006

In November 2010, it was reported in Hansard that Valiant had run aground in the North Norwegian Sea in March 1991.

Following the development of engine trouble in June 1994, she was paid off on 12 August 1994.

Her hull and reactor are currently laid up afloat at Devonport Dockyard, Plymouth, Devon, until facilities are available for the long term storage of her radioactive components.

Courageous was selected for the museum ship to represent the SSN fleet of the Royal Navy during the Cold War. Components were removed from Valiant to restore Courageous.

== Bibliography ==
- Ballantyne, Iain (2014). Hunter Killers: The Dramatic Untold Story of the Royal Navy's Most Secret Service. London: Orion. ISBN 978-1-4091-3901-0.
- Hennessy, Peter; Jinks, James (2016). The Silent Deep: The Royal Navy Submarine Service since 1945. Penguin. ISBN 978-0-241-95948-0.
- Middlebrook, Martin (2012). The Falklands War. Barnsley, UK: Pen & Sword Military. ISBN 978-1-84884-636-4.
- Moore, John, ed. (1982). Janes Fighting Ships 1982–83. Jane's Publishing. p. 547. ISBN 0-7106-0742-3.
