= Valiant-class submarine =

1966 class of British fleet submarines

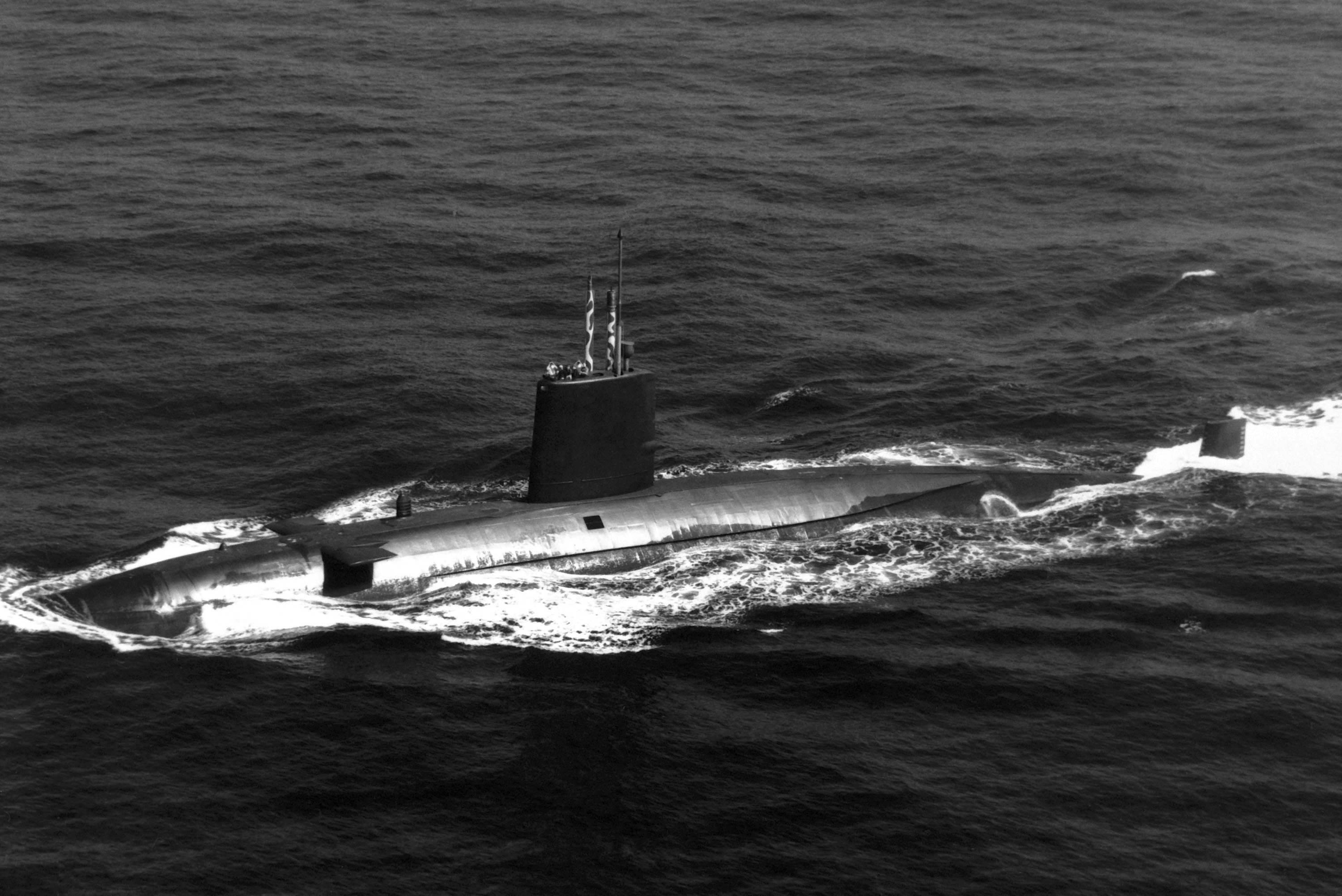
- A Valiant-class submarine

Class overview
- Builders: Vickers Armstrong
- Operators: Royal Navy
- Preceded by: HMS Dreadnought
- Succeeded by: Churchill class
- In commission: 18 July 1966 – 12 August 1994
- Completed: 2
- Retired: 2

General characteristics
- Type: Nuclear submarine
- Displacement: 4,400 long tons (4,500 t) surfaced; 4,900 long tons (5,000 t) submerged
- Length: 285 ft (87 m)
- Beam: 33 ft 3 in (10.13 m)
- Draught: 27 ft (8.2 m)
- Propulsion: 1 × Rolls-Royce pressurised water reactor; 2 × steam turbines; 1 shaft
- Speed: 20 knots (23 mph; 37 km/h) surfaced; 29 knots (33 mph; 54 km/h) submerged
- Range: Unlimited, except by food supplies
- Complement: 103
- Armament: Originally : 6 × 21 in (533 mm) bow torpedo tubes; 32 × Mark VIII and Tigerfish torpedoes; or; 64 × Mk.5 and Mk.6 mines; Later : 26 × torpedoes; 6 × UGM-84B Harpoon Anti-ship missiles; or; Stonefish and Sea Urchin mines

The Valiant class were a class of two nuclear-powered fleet submarines in service with the Royal Navy from the mid-1960s until 1994. They were the first fully British nuclear fleet submarine; the earlier HMS Dreadnought used an American nuclear reactor. Of the two the first, Valiant (the nameship) commissioned in 1966 three years after Dreadnought, with Warspite the following year. Both were built by Vickers at Barrow-in-Furness.

== Design ==
The class were based on Dreadnought, but were enlarged by 20 feet (6 m) and had a dived displacement of 4,900 tons compared to 4,000 tons. Improvements made since the original Dreadnought meant that they ran significantly quieter under main power, and also had a Paxman diesel-electric generator that could be used for silent running. In most other respects (outside the power plant), the Valiants were identical to Dreadnought.

According to former head of the Royal Corps of Naval Constructors R.J. Daniel, when US Admiral Hyman G. Rickover, widely regarded as the father of the nuclear submarine, initially learned of the proposed rafting system for the Valiant class, (in which ship's machinery is acoustically isolated from the hull by padding known as "rafts"), he was dismissive of the concept, with the result that the Royal Navy gained an advantage in submarine silencing that the United States Navy did not introduce until considerably later.

== Service ==
The Valiants were primarily used in the anti-submarine role, important during the Cold War. In 1967 Valiant set a Royal Navy (RN) record of sailing 12,000 miles (19,312 km) submerged in twenty-eight days, from Singapore to the UK. Both boats received a number of refits, including the capability to use the Harpoon missile. Valiant and other nuclear fleet submarines served in the Falklands War in 1982.

The Valiants had long careers: Warspite was decommissioned in 1991, and Valiant in 1994, due to cracks being discovered in her primary to secondary cooling system. They were very successful and served as the template for the Resolution-class ballistic missile submarine and subsequent Churchill-class fleet submarines.

== Construction Programme ==
Pennant	Name	(a) Hull builder (b) Main machinery manufacturers	Ordered	Laid down	Launched	Accepted into service	Commissioned	Decommissioned	Estimated building cost
S102	Valiant	(a) Vickers Ltd, Shipbuilding Group, Barrow-in-Furness (b) Vickers Ltd, Engineering Group, Barrow-in-Furness (b) Rolls-Royce and Associates Ltd.	31 August 1960	21 January 1962	3 December 1963	July 1966	18 July 1966	12 August 1994	£25,300,000
S103	Warspite	(a) Vickers Ltd, Shipbuilding Group, Barrow-in-Furness (b) Vickers Ltd, Engineering Group, Barrow-in-Furness (b) Rolls-Royce and Associates Ltd.	12 December 1962	10 December 1963	25 September 1965	April 1967	18 April 1967	1991	£21,455,000

== See also ==
List of submarines of the Royal Navy
