= HMS Dreadnought (S101) =

Submarine of the Royal Navy

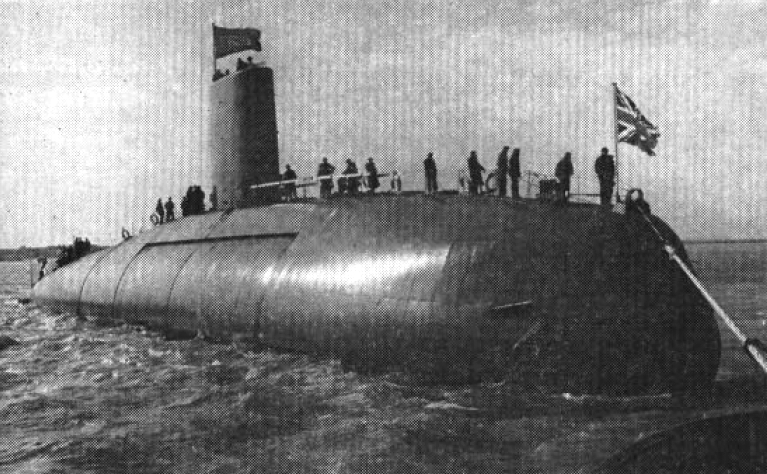
- HMS Dreadnought (S101) after launch 1960

Class overview
- Builders: Vickers Armstrongs, Barrow-in-Furness
- Operators: Royal Navy
- Succeeded by: Valiant class
- Built: 1959–1962
- In commission: 1963–1980

History

United Kingdom
- Name: HMS Dreadnought
- Builder: Vickers Armstrongs, Barrow-in-Furness
- Laid down: 12 June 1959
- Launched: 21 October 1960
- Commissioned: 17 April 1963
- Decommissioned: 1980
- Identification: Pennant number: S101
- Fate: Laid up at Rosyth Dockyard
- Badge

General characteristics
- Class & type: Nuclear-powered submarine
- Displacement: 3,500 tons surfaced (3,556 tonnes); 4,000 tons submerged (4,064 tonnes)
- Length: 265.7 ft (81.0 m)
- Beam: 31.2 ft (9.5 m)
- Draught: 25.9 ft (7.9 m)
- Propulsion: 1 x Westinghouse S5W reactor, two geared steam turbines, one shaft, 15,000 shp (11,000 kW)
- Speed: 20 knots (37 km/h; 23 mph) surfaced; 28 knots (52 km/h; 32 mph) submerged
- Complement: 113
- Armament: 6 x bow tubes for 21 inch (533 mm) torpedoes, 24 rounds carried

The seventh Royal Navy ship to be named HMS Dreadnought was the United Kingdom's first nuclear-powered submarine, built by Vickers Armstrongs at Barrow-in-Furness. Launched by Queen Elizabeth II on Trafalgar Day 1960 and commissioned into service with the Royal Navy in April 1963, she continued in service until 1980. The submarine was powered by a S5W reactor, a design made available as a direct result of the 1958 US–UK Mutual Defence Agreement.

== Design and construction ==
The Royal Navy had been researching designs for nuclear propulsion plants since 1946, but this work was suspended indefinitely in October 1952. In 1955, the United States Navy completed USS Nautilus, the world's first nuclear-powered submarine. During subsequent exercises with the Royal Navy, Nautilus demonstrated the advantages of the nuclear submarine against British anti-submarine forces, which had developed extensive anti-submarine warfare techniques during the Battle of the Atlantic. The Admiralty appreciated the utility of such vessels and under the drive of the First Sea Lord, Admiral The Earl Mountbatten of Burma and the Flag Officer Submarines, Sir Wilfrid Woods, plans were formed to build nuclear-powered submarines.

Although the plan was to build all-British nuclear submarines, much time would be saved by accepting American nuclear technology. The excellent relations between Admiral Mountbatten and US Navy Chief of Naval Operations Arleigh Burke, expedited obtaining that help. This was despite Rear Admiral Hyman Rickover, in charge of the American naval nuclear power programme, being set against any transfer of technology; indeed, Rickover prevented Mountbatten inspecting USS Nautilus. It was not until a visit to Britain in 1956 that Rickover changed his mind and withdrew his objections. Although Rickover wished to supply the third generation S3W reactor of the Skate class, Mountbatten exerted his influence and the entire machinery system for an American Skipjack-class submarine, with its fifth generation S5W reactor, was obtained. This was known as the "American Sector" (see 1958 US-UK Mutual Defence Agreement). The hull and combat systems of Dreadnought were of British design and construction, although British access to the Electric Boat Company influenced the hull form and construction practices. During Dreadnought's construction, Rolls-Royce, in collaboration with the United Kingdom Atomic Energy Authority at the Admiralty Research Station, HMS Vulcan, at Dounreay, developed a completely new British nuclear propulsion system. On 31 August 1960, the UK's second nuclear-powered submarine was ordered from Vickers Armstrong and, fitted with Rolls-Royce's PWR1 nuclear plant, Valiant was the first all-British nuclear submarine.

The name Dreadnought was chosen because it represented 'a land-mark in naval history, associated as it is with revolutionary war-ship design.' Dreadnought was laid down on 12 June 1959. She was at that time the largest pressure vessel ever constructed in the UK. The hull was constructed of QT35 steel (QT standing for Quenched and Tempered) designed to withstand greater depths.

She was launched by Queen Elizabeth II on Trafalgar Day, 21 October 1960. She then proceeded for fitting out at a nearby floating dock. The reactor was installed on 8 July 1962 and went critical in November 1962. She commenced sea-trials in mid-December 1962 in the Irish Sea. Dreadnought made her first dive, in Ramsden Dock, on 10 January 1963. She was commissioned on 17 April 1963.

== Construction programme ==
Number	Name	(a) Hull builder (b) Main machinery manufacturers	Ordered	Laid down	Launched	Accepted into service	Commissioned	Estimated building cost
S101	Dreadnought	(a) Vickers Ltd, Shipbuilding Group, Barrow-in-Furness (b) Westinghouse Electric Corporation, USA.		12 June 1959	21 October 1960	April 1963	17 April 1963	£18,400,000

== Service ==
In the mid-1960s, Dreadnought's visits included trips to Norfolk, Virginia; Bermuda; Rotterdam; and Kiel. In October 1964, she participated in a joint maritime exercise with US and Canadian naval forces to the north of Scotland. During the exercise, the task force was monitored by a group of three Soviet submarines and three Soviet ships.

She was at Gibraltar in 1965, 1966, and 1967, and on 19 September 1967, she left Rosyth, Scotland for Singapore on a sustained high-speed run. The round trip finished as 4,640 miles surfaced and 26,545 miles submerged.

During her career, Dreadnought performed many varied missions. On 24 June 1967, she was ordered to sink the wrecked and drifting German ship Essberger Chemist. Three torpedoes hit along the length of the target, but the gunners of HMS Salisbury, a frigate, completed the task by piercing the tanks which were just keeping Essberger Chemist afloat.

Apart from minor hull-cracking problems, Dreadnought proved to be a reliable vessel, popular with her crews. On 10 September 1970, she completed a major refit at Rosyth, in the course of which her nuclear core was refuelled and her ballast tank valves were changed to reduce noise.

In early 1971, Dreadnought took part in an Arctic exercise, codenamed 'Sniff'. While participating in the exercise under the command of CO Alan Kennedy, on 3 March 1971, Dreadnought became the first British nuclear submarine to surface at the North Pole. On return to Faslane, it was later discovered that the ice had caused minor damage to the propeller, bow and fins.

In 1973, she took part in the Royal Navy's first annual Group Deployment, when a group of warships and auxiliaries would undertake a long deployment to maintain fighting efficiency and "show the flag" around the world.

In November 1977, while under the command of CO Hugh Mitchell, she diverted from a planned 8-month deployment to Australia to proceed to Gibraltar and then to the South Atlantic. Together with the frigates Alacrity and Phoebe, Dreadnought took part in Operation Journeyman, a deployment to the South Atlantic in 1977 (prior to the Falklands War) to deter possible Argentine aggression against the Falkland Islands and to undertake covert surveillance.

== Fate ==
Due to machinery damage and the limited refit facilities then available for nuclear fleet submarines, Dreadnought was withdrawn from service in 1980. Dreadnought is now at Rosyth Dockyard, laid up in afloat storage until she can be safely disposed under the auspices of the UK Ministry of Defence (MOD)'s Submarine Dismantling Project (SDP). Her nuclear fuel has been removed but much of her interior remains intact. She was docked down during 2012 for her periodic hull inspection and re-preservation. Campaigners hope that she will be returned to Barrow after decommissioning as a tourist attraction in the town.

== See also ==
- Valiant class
- List of submarines of the Royal Navy
- List of submarine classes of the Royal Navy
