= List of ship launches in 1957 =

The list of ship launches in 1957 includes a chronological list of all ships launched in 1957.

	Ship	Class / type	Builder	Location	Country	Notes
29 January	King Theseus	Cargo ship	Blyth Dry Docks & Shipbuilding Co. Ltd	Blyth, Northumberland	United Kingdom	For Dalhousie Steam and Motorship Co. Ltd.
31 January	Y.C.467	Lighter	J. Bolson & Son Ltd.	Poole	United Kingdom	For Admiralty.
31 January	Y.C.468	Lighter	J. Bolson & Son Ltd.	Poole	United Kingdom	For Admiralty.
January	ADDSCO 609	Barge	Alabama Drydock and Shipbuilding Company	Mobile, Alabama	United States	For Alabama Drydock and Shipbuilding Company.
January	ADDSCO 610	Barge	Alabama Drydock and Shipbuilding Company	Mobile, Alabama	United States	For Alabama Drydock and Shipbuilding Company.
2 February	Bigelow	Forrest Sherman-class destroyer	Bath Iron Works	Bath, Maine	United States	
14 February	Afghanistan	Ore carrier	Harland & Wolff	Belfast	United Kingdom	For Commons Bros. Ltd.
14 February	Blackpool	Whitby-class frigate	Harland & Wolff	Belfast	United Kingdom	For Royal Navy.
15 February	Crestbank	Cargo ship	Harland & Wolff	Belfast	United Kingdom	For Bank Line.
16 February	Lindau	Lindau-class minehunter	Burmester shipyard	Bremen	West Germany	For German Navy
18 February	Tunets	Fishing trawler	Brooke Marine Ltd.	Lowestoft	United Kingdom	For private owner.
28 February	De Soto County	De Soto County-class tank landing ship	Avondale Shipyard	Avondale, Louisiana	United States	
February	ADDSCO 611	Barge	Alabama Drydock and Shipbuilding Company	Mobile, Alabama	United States	For Alabama Drydock and Shipbuilding Company.
February	ADDSCO 612	Barge	Alabama Drydock and Shipbuilding Company	Mobile, Alabama	United States	For Alabama Drydock and Shipbuilding Company.
5 March	York County	De Soto County-class tank landing ship	Newport News Shipbuilding	Newport News, Virginia	United States	
9 March	Joseph K. Taussig	Dealey-class destroyer escort	New York Shipbuilding	Camden, New Jersey	United States	
14 March	Esso Glasgow	T2 tanker	Harland & Wolff	Belfast	United Kingdom	New midsection, for Esso Petroleum Co.
15 March	King Charles	Cargo ship	Harland & Wolff	Belfast	United Kingdom	For King Line.
18 March	Mullinnix	Forrest Sherman-class destroyer	Fore River Shipyard	Quincy, Massachusetts	United States	
31 March	Frederico C	Ocean liner	Ansaldo Shipyards	Italy	Italy	For Costa Cruises
March	ADDSCO 613	Barge	Alabama Drydock and Shipbuilding Company	Mobile, Alabama	United States	For Alabama Drydock and Shipbuilding Company.
March	Margaret	Drill barge	Alabama Drydock and Shipbuilding Company	Mobile, Alabama	United States	For Ocean Drilling & Exploration.
6 April	Rion	Fishing trawler	Brooke Marine Ltd.	Lowestoft	United Kingdom	For private owner.
16 April	Vitrinia	Tanker	Harland & Wolff	Belfast	United Kingdom	For Shell Oil Co.
30 April	Picardy	Refrigerated cargo ship	Harland & Wolff	Belfast	United Kingdom	For Royal Mail Line.
April	Mr. Arthur	Submersible	Alabama Drydock and Shipbuilding Company	Mobile, Alabama	United States	For Coral Drilling Co. Inc.
April	SK 217	Barge	Alabama Drydock and Shipbuilding Company	Mobile, Alabama	United States	For International Paper Co.
April	SK 218	Barge	Alabama Drydock and Shipbuilding Company	Mobile, Alabama	United States	For International Paper Co.
April	SK 219	Barge	Alabama Drydock and Shipbuilding Company	Mobile, Alabama	United States	For International Paper Co.
April	SK 220	Barge	Alabama Drydock and Shipbuilding Company	Mobile, Alabama	United States	For International Paper Co.
1 May	Rampisham	Ham-class minesweeper	J. Bolson & Son Ltd.	Poole	United Kingdom	For Royal Navy.
16 May	Skate	Skate-class submarine	Electric Boat	Groton, Connecticut	United States	
17 May	Stavrida	Fishing trawler	Brooke Marine Ltd.	Lowestoft	United Kingdom	For private owner.
29 May	Thessaly	Refrigerated cargo ship	Harland & Wolff	Belfast	United Kingdom	For Royal Mail Line.
30 May	Carronbank	Cargo ship	Harland & Wolff	Belfast	United Kingdom	For Bank Line.
30 May	Duncan	Blackwood-class frigate	John I. Thornycroft & Company	Southampton, England	United Kingdom	
May	SK 221	Barge	Alabama Drydock and Shipbuilding Company	Mobile, Alabama	United States	For International Paper Co.
May	SK 222	Barge	Alabama Drydock and Shipbuilding Company	Mobile, Alabama	United States	For International Paper Co.
3 June	Gatineau	Restigouche-class destroyer	Davie Shipbuilding	Lauzon, Quebec	Canada	
7 June	Bauer	Dealey-class destroyer escort	Bethlehem Steel	San Francisco, California	United States	
22 June	Lorain County	De Soto County-class tank landing ship	American Shipbuilding	Lorain, Ohio	United States	
30 June	Drumbeat	Yacht	Clare Lallow	Cowes	United Kingdom	For M. Aitken.
30 June	Santander	Yacht	R. & W. Clark	East Cowes	United Kingdom	For R. Green.
June	MGO 74	Barge	Alabama Drydock and Shipbuilding Company	Mobile, Alabama	United States	For Mene Grande Oil Company.
June	MGO 75	Barge	Alabama Drydock and Shipbuilding Company	Mobile, Alabama	United States	For Mene Grande Oil Company.
June	MGO 76	Barge	Alabama Drydock and Shipbuilding Company	Mobile, Alabama	United States	For Mene Grande Oil Company.
June	MGO 77	Barge	Alabama Drydock and Shipbuilding Company	Mobile, Alabama	United States	For Mene Grande Oil Company.
1 July	Ayanami	Ayanami-class destroyer			Japan	
1 July	Shonguy	Fishing trawler	Brooke Marine Ltd.	Lowestoft	United Kingdom	For private owner.
2 July	Grayback	Grayback-class submarine	Mare Island Naval Shipyard	Vallejo, California	United States	
31 July	Kotlas	Fishing trawler	Brooke Marine Ltd.	Lowestoft	United Kingdom	For private owner.
1 August	Hooper	Dealey-class destroyer escort	Bethlehem Steel	San Francisco, California	United States	
9 August	Loch Loyal	Refrigerated cargo ship	Harland & Wolff	Belfast	United Kingdom	For Royal Mail Line.
10 August	Hull	Forrest Sherman-class destroyer	Bath Iron Works	Bath, Maine	United States	
27 August	King George	Cargo ship	Harland & Wolff	Belfast	United Kingdom	For King Line.
27 August	Swordfish	Skate-class submarine	Portsmouth Naval Shipyard	Kittery, Maine	United States	
28 August	Dartbank	Cargo ship	Harland & Wolff	Belfast	United Kingdom	For Bank Line.
28 August	Santa Rosa	Santa-Rosa-class cargo liner	Newport News Shipbuilding	Newport News	United States	For Grace Line
29 August	Uranami	Ayanami-class destroyer			Japan	
9 September	Graham County	De Soto County-class tank landing ship	Newport News Shipbuilding	Newport News, Virginia	United States	
10 September	Accord	Confiance-class tug	Harland & Wolff	Belfast	United Kingdom	For Royal Navy.
24 September	Blyth Adventurer	Tanker	Blyth Dry Docks & Shipbuilding Co. Ltd	Blyth, Northumberland	United Kingdom	For Blyth Dry Docks & Shipbuilding Co. Ltd.
25 September	British Honour	Tanker	Harland & Wolff	Belfast	United Kingdom	For British Tanker Company.
25 September	Shikinami	Ayanami-class destroyer			Japan	
27 September	Richard S. Edwards	Forrest Sherman-class destroyer	Puget Sound Bridge and Dredging Company	Seattle, Washington	United States	
30 September	Isonami	Ayanami-class destroyer			Japan	
8 October	Alaric	Cargo ship	Harland & Wolff	Belfast	United Kingdom	For Shaw Savill Line.
10 October	Sargo	Skate-class submarine	Mare Island Naval Shipyard	Vallejo, California	United States	
17 October	Saxlingham	Ham-class minesweeper	Berthon Boat Co. Ltd	Lymington	United Kingdom	For Royal Navy.
25 October	Narwhal	Porpoise-class submarine	Vickers-Armstrongs	Barrow-in-Furness	United Kingdom	
26 October	Okun	Fishing trawler	Brooke Marine Ltd.	Lowestoft	United Kingdom	For private owner.
13 November	Chaudière	Restigouche-class destroyer	Halifax Shipyards	Halifax, Nova Scotia	Canada	
17 November	St. Croix	Restigouche-class destroyer	Marine Industries Limited	Sorel, Quebec	Canada	
22 November	Port Invercargill	Refrigerated cargo ship	Harland & Wolff	Belfast	United Kingdom	For Port Line.
11 December	Bolton Abbey	Cargo liner	Brooke Marine Ltd.	Lowestoft	United Kingdom	For Associated Humber Lines Ltd.
11 December	Cachalot	Porpoise-class submarine	Scotts Shipbuilding and Engineering Company	Greenock Scotland	United Kingdom	
11 December	Flying Dipper	Tug	Harland & Wolff	Belfast	United Kingdom	For Clyde Shipping Co.
14 December	Wood County	De Soto County-class tank landing ship	American Shipbuilding	Lorain, Ohio	United States	
21 December	Clemenceau	Clemenceau-class aircraft carrier	Arsenal de Brest	Brest, France	France	
24 December	Pendennis Castle	Ocean liner	Harland and Wolff	Belfast	United Kingdom	For Union-Castle Line.
27 December	Garrybank	Cargo ship	Harland & Wolff	Belfast	United Kingdom	For Bank Line.
December	MGO 80	Barge	Alabama Drydock and Shipbuilding Company	Mobile, Alabama	United States	For Mene Grande Oil Company.
December	MGO 81	Barge	Alabama Drydock and Shipbuilding Company	Mobile, Alabama	United States	For Mene Grande Oil Company.
December	MGO 82	Barge	Alabama Drydock and Shipbuilding Company	Mobile, Alabama	United States	For Mene Grande Oil Company.
December	MGO 83	Barge	Alabama Drydock and Shipbuilding Company	Mobile, Alabama	United States	For Mene Grande Oil Company.
Unknown date	F.C.36	Lighter	J. Bolson & Son Ltd.	Poole	United Kingdom	For Admiralty.
Unknown date	F.C.37	Lighter	J. Bolson & Son Ltd.	Poole	United Kingdom	For Admiralty.
Unknown date	F.C.38	Lighter	J. Bolson & Son Ltd.	Poole	United Kingdom	For Admiralty.
Unknown date	Gwato Creek	Tug	J. Bolson & Son Ltd.	Poole	United Kingdom	For Shell BP Petroleum Development Co. of Nigeria.
