= List of shipwrecks in 1985 =

The list of shipwrecks in 1985 includes ships sunk, foundered, grounded, or otherwise lost during 1985.

table of contents
1985
Jan	Feb	Mar	Apr
May	Jun	Jul	Aug
Sep	Oct	Nov	Dec
Unknown date

== January ==
=== 1 January ===
List of shipwrecks: 1 January 1985
Ship	State	Description
Danny Boy	United States	The fishing vessel burned and sank off "Smith Island" in the waters of Alaska. The wreck report does not specify which of several islands of the name it refers to.

=== 6 January ===
List of shipwrecks: 6 January 1985
Ship	State	Description
Ardea	United States	The 38-foot (11.6 m) vessel dragged her anchor and was wrecked in King Cove (58°04′N 157°29′W) on the coast of Afognak Island in Alaska′s Kodiak Archipelago. Her crew survived.

=== 14 January ===
List of shipwrecks: 14 January 1985
Ship	State	Description
K-Jo	United States	The 34-foot (10.4 m) fishing vessel sank off Marmot Island in Alaska′s Kodiak Archipelago with the loss of one life. Her two survivors were rescued on 16 January.

=== 17 January ===
List of shipwrecks: 17 January 1985
Ship	State	Description
Byron I	United Kingdom	The cargo ship was wrecked at Kalilimenes, Crete, Greece. She was on a voyage from Gdynia, Poland to India.

=== 21 January ===
List of shipwrecks: 21 January 1985
Ship	State	Description
Chil Bo San No. 6	South Korea	The 285-foot (86.9 m) fishing trawler was abandoned in a sinking condition in the Bering Sea approximately 200 nautical miles (370 km; 230 mi) northwest of Adak Island in the Aleutian Islands. Another South Korean vessel rescued her crew of 29. Her crew may have returned to her later to salvage her.

=== Unknown date ===
List of shipwrecks: Unknown date in January 1985
Ship	State	Description
Manolis L	Liberia	The cargo ship ran aground and sank in Notre Dame Bay, Newfoundland, Canada.

== February ==
=== 5 February ===
List of shipwrecks: 5 February 1985
Ship	State	Description
Rosa	United States	The fishing vessel sank after being surrounded by ice in Marguerite Bay (55°43′N 131°38′W) in Southeast Alaska near Ketchikan, Alaska.

=== 7 February ===
List of shipwrecks: 7 February 1985
Ship	State	Description
El Rancho	United States	The 82-foot (25.0 m) crab-fishing vessel capsized and sank in the Gulf of Alaska approximately 35 nautical miles (65 km; 40 mi) west of Cape Alitak on the south end of Alaska′s Kodiak Island. A United States Coast Guard helicopter rescued her entire crew of five.

=== 8 February ===
List of shipwrecks: 8 February 1985
Ship	State	Description
Busko Zdroj	Poland	The cargo ship capsized and sank off Sylt, West Germany with the loss of all but one of her 25 crew.

=== 14 February ===
List of shipwrecks: 14 February 1985
Ship	State	Description
Alert	United States	The 129-gross ton, 70.5-foot (21.5 m) or 94-foot (28.7 m) fishing vessel was last seen in the Shelikof Strait suffering from heavy icing and bound for Bumble Bay (57°16′30″N 154°41′30″W) on the southwest coast of Alaska′s Kodiak Island after a sudden onset of increasing winds and wave heights and dropping temperatures. She subsequently disappeared with the loss of her entire crew of five, leaving only an oil slick behind.

=== 15 February ===
List of shipwrecks: 15 February 1985
Ship	State	Description
A Regina	Panama	Passenger and cargo ferry ran aground off Isla de Mona

=== 20 February ===
List of shipwrecks: 20 February 1985
Ship	State	Description
ARA Santa Fe	Argentine Navy	The wrecked Balao-class submarine captured during the Falklands War in 1982 was refloated on 11 February, taken to deep water to be scuttled by British forces, but sank in the South Atlantic Ocean 5 miles (8.0 km) north of South Georgia Island.

=== 26 February ===
List of shipwrecks: 26 February 1985
Ship	State	Description
Tagukak	United States	The 43-foot (13.1 m) vessel was destroyed by fire in the Gulf of Alaska off Spruce Cape (57°49′15″N 152°20′00″W) on Kodiak Island. A Kodiak, Alaska, harbormaster shuttle ferry crew rescued her operator.

== March ==
=== 3 March ===
List of shipwrecks: 3 March 1985
Ship	State	Description
John A. Downs	United States	The 113-foot (34.4 m) tug sank in 230 feet (70 m) of water in Long Island Sound 2 nautical miles (3.7 km; 2.3 mi) northwest of Great Gull Island at 41°14′09″N 072°07′51″W after colliding with a barge she was towing. Her entire crew of eight survived.

=== 6 March ===
List of shipwrecks: 6 March 1985
Ship	State	Description
Ludvig Svoboda	Soviet Union	The tanker exploded and sank at Ventspils, Latvian SSR killing one crewman and injuring five others.

=== 21 March ===
List of shipwrecks: 21 March 1985
Ship	State	Description
Ocean Bounty	United States	The 90-foot (27.4 m) fishing vessel sank during a gale in the Gulf of Alaska approximately 110 nautical miles (200 km; 130 mi) south of Cape Saint Elias, Alaska. A United States Coast Guard helicopter rescued her crew of three.

=== 24 March ===
List of shipwrecks: 24 March 1985
Ship	State	Description
Eastern Star	Liberia	Iran–Iraq War: The supertanker was damaged in an attack by Iraqi Air Force aircraft off Kharg Island, Iran.
Volece	Italy	Iran–Iraq War: The supertanker was damaged in an attack by Iraqi Air Force aircraft off Kharg Island.

=== 26 March ===
List of shipwrecks: 26 March 1985
Ship	State	Description
Nordic Pride	United States	The fishing vessel sank in the Bering Sea just west of the Pribilof Islands. The fishing vessel Starlite (United States) rescued her entire crew of five.

=== 29 March ===
List of shipwrecks: 29 March 1985
Ship	State	Description
Pauline Marie	United States	The retired fishing vessel was scuttled as an artificial reef in 85 feet (26 m) of water in the North Atlantic Ocean east of Ocean City, New Jersey, at 39°13.763′N 074°12.182′W.

=== 30 March ===
List of shipwrecks: 30 March 1985
Ship	State	Description
Mercedes I	Venezuela	The cargo ship was scuttled with explosive charges off Fort Lauderdale, Florida, to form an artificial reef.

== April ==
=== 7 April ===
List of shipwrecks: 7 April 1985
Ship	State	Description
Caroline	United Kingdom	The 700-ton coaster capsized and sank south of The Lizard in heavy seas. Seven men were rescued by a Royal Navy Wessex helicopter, and one by the Lizard lifeboat.

=== 11 April ===
List of shipwrecks: 11 April 1985
Ship	State	Description
TCG Yildirim	Turkish Navy	The patrol vessel was destroyed by an explosion and fire in the Aegean Sea off Mitylene.

=== 18 April ===
List of shipwrecks: 18 April 1985
Ship	State	Description
GC-231	Nicaraguan Navy	Contra War: The patrol boat was sunk by Honduran Air Force aircraft, with casualties.

=== 23 April ===
List of shipwrecks: 23 April 1985
Ship	State	Description
Canadian Progress	Canada	The lake freighter ran aground 5 miles (8.0 km) east of Ogdensburg, New York in the Saint Lawrence River. The ship required the assistance of tugboats to be freed.

=== 27 April ===
List of shipwrecks: 27 April 1985
Ship	State	Description
Moon Song	United States	The 50-foot (15.2 m) seiner sank off Cape Chiniak (57°37′N 152°10′W) near Kodiak, Alaska. All six people on board survived.

=== 28 April ===
List of shipwrecks: 28 April 1985
Ship	State	Description
Lady Marjorie	Canada	The foundering fishing boat was shelled and sunk by the 3-inch (76 mm) guns of HMCS Nipigon (Maritime Command) as a hazard to navigation after rescuing her crew.

=== 29 April ===
List of shipwrecks: 29 April 1985
Ship	State	Description
Bertha	United States	The fishing vessel capsized without warning and sank off Gore Point (59°12′00″N 150°57′30″W) on the south-central coast of Alaska. The fishing vessel Wilson (United States) rescued her crew of four.

== May ==
=== 9 May ===
List of shipwrecks: 9 May 1985
Ship	State	Description
Shirley Ann	United States	Loaded with discarded tires, the retired 80-foot (24.4 m) barge was scuttled as an artificial reef in the North Atlantic Ocean 6.5 nautical miles (12.0 km; 7.5 mi) off Harvey Cedars, New Jersey, in 80 feet (24 m) of water at 39°37.399′N 074°01.668′W.

=== 10 May ===
List of shipwrecks: 10 May 1985
Ship	State	Description
Zeeliner	United States	The retired 63-foot (19.2 m) ferry was scuttled as an artificial reef in the North Atlantic Ocean off Fire Island south of Long Island, New York, in 75 feet (23 m) of water.

=== 16 May ===
List of shipwrecks: 16 May 1985
Ship	State	Description
Anna O	United States	While towing the gillnet fishing vessel Head and Tails (United States), the 11-gross register ton 31.6-foot (9.6 m) seiner ran aground on Softuk Bar (60°13′N 144°40′W) in Controller Bay (60.0770°N 144.2178°W) on the south-central coast of Alaska and was lost. The only person aboard perished.
Head and Tails	United States	While under tow by the seiner Anna O (United States) with no one aboard, the 26-foot (7.9 m) gillnet fishing vessel ran aground on Softuk Bar (60°13′N 144°40′W) in Controller Bay (60.0770°N 144.2178°W) on the south-central coast of Alaska and was lost. She later was salvaged.

=== 20 May ===
List of shipwrecks: 20 May 1985
Ship	State	Description
Kimberly	United States	The fishing vessel sank in the Bering Sea approximately 80 nautical miles (150 km; 92 mi) northwest of Dutch Harbor, Alaska, with the loss of one life. Four members of her crew survived.

=== 22 May ===
List of shipwrecks: 22 May 1985
Ship	State	Description
Polar Storm	United States	The 52-foot (15.8 m) fishing vessel burned and sank in the Gulf of Alaska 120 nautical miles (220 km; 140 mi) northeast of Kodiak, Alaska. The fishing vessel Trident (United States) rescued her four-man crew.

=== 27 May ===
List of shipwrecks: 27 May 1985
Ship	State	Description
Petrogen One and Camponavia	Japan; Spain	The Japanese ship Petragen One docked at the Gibraltar-San Roque Refinery and was unloading 20,000 tons of naphtha, which exploded and also caused the Spanish tanker Camponavia to catch fire. 33 people died and 36 were injured. The fire started explosions in Camponavia, which broke in two and sank in a slick of burning oil. The Japanese ship also snapped in two, leaving only the burning bow and stern visible above the waterline.

=== 28 May ===
List of shipwrecks: 28 May 1985
Ship	State	Description
Maratha Transhipper	India	The bulk carrier was driven ashore and wrecked at Mormugao.

== June ==
=== 2 June ===
List of shipwrecks: 2 June 1985
Ship	State	Description
Indulgence	United Kingdom	The yacht, a contender for the America's Cup, ran aground and sank off the Isle of Wight. All ten crew rescued by Local Hero (flag unknown)

=== 3 June ===
List of shipwrecks: 3 June 1985
Ship	State	Description
American	United States	The retired 125-foot (38.1 m) schooner was scuttled as an artificial reef in 120 feet (37 m) of water in the North Atlantic Ocean east of Ocean City, New Jersey, at 39°13.855′N 074°12.332′W. Her masts broke loose and floated to the surface, and were retrieved after she sank.

=== 4 June ===
List of shipwrecks: 4 June 1985
Ship	State	Description
HMS Advice	Royal Navy	The Confiance-class tug was sunk as a target.

=== 16 June ===
List of shipwrecks: 16 June 1985
Ship	State	Description
Bridgeness	United Kingdom	Ran aground on the Hats and Barrels Reef, off the Welsh coast and sank.

=== 23 June ===
List of shipwrecks: 23 June 1985
Ship	State	Description
Arctic Career	Panama	A bulk carrier that sank 440 nautical miles (810 km; 510 mi) northwest of Tristan da Cunha in heavy weather. The entire crew was killed in the sinking.

=== 27 June ===
List of shipwrecks: 27 June 1985
Ship	State	Description
Al Rubiya	Kuwait	The refrigerated coaster sprang a leak and sank at Bombay, India. Subsequently refloated and scrapped.

== July ==
=== 3 July ===
List of shipwrecks: 3 July 1985
Ship	State	Description
First Lady	United States	The retired 95-foot (29.0 m) fishing trawler and clam dredger was scuttled as an artificial reef in 100 feet (30 m) of water in the North Atlantic Ocean east of Ocean City, New Jersey, at 39°13.703′N 074°12.486′W.

=== 10 July ===
List of shipwrecks: 10 July 1985
Ship	State	Description
Rainbow Warrior	Netherlands	Opération Satanique - Sabotaged by DGSE agents and sunk in Auckland, New Zealand.

=== 12 July ===
List of shipwrecks: 12 July 1985
Ship	State	Description
Alliance	United States	While tied alongside the fishing vessel Dawn L (United States) and refueling Dawn L, the 63-foot (19.2 m) fish tender exploded and sank off Axel Lind Island (60°47′30″N 147°43′30″W) in Prince William Sound on the south-central coast of Alaska. Dawn L also exploded and sank. Alliance was later salvaged. The seven people aboard both vessels all survived.
Dawn L	United States	While tied alongside the fish tender Alliance (United States) and refueling from Alliance, the 45-foot (13.7 m) fishing vessel exploded and sank off Axel Lind Island (60°47′30″N 147°43′30″W) in Prince William Sound on the south-central coast of Alaska. Alliance also exploded and sank. The seven people aboard both vessels all survived.

=== 13 July ===
List of shipwrecks: 13 July 1985
Ship	State	Description
Sea ZZZs	United States	The gillnet fishing vessel was destroyed by an explosion and fire in the small-boat harbor at Valdez, Alaska.

=== 21 July ===
List of shipwrecks: 21 July 1985
Ship	State	Description
Amaretto	United States	After being stolen, the 71-foot (22 m) sardine-fishing vessel was scuttled by the thieves in 120 feet (37 m) of water in Penobscot Bay 2 nautical miles (3.7 km; 2.3 mi) east of Owls Head, Maine, at 44°05′35.29″N 068°59′53.13″W.
Frodo Durban	Brazil	The tanker ran aground at the entrance to Hong Kong Harbour.

=== 23 July ===
List of shipwrecks: 23 July
Ship	State	Description
Dit Out	United States	The boat was lost in the harbor at Homer, Alaska, when her engine exploded just off the fuel dock.
Roule	Honduras	Lebanese Civil War: The cargo ship was shelled and sunk at Sidon, Lebanon by Israeli artillery.

=== 24 July ===
List of shipwrecks: 24 July 1985
Ship	State	Description
Tylene	United States	The fish tender sank in Trading Bay (60°55′N 151°35′W) on the coast of Alaska after a wooden plank came loose, causing her to flood, and her pump failed.

=== 26 July ===
List of shipwrecks: 26 July 1985
Ship	State	Description
Mari Jana	United States	The fishing vessel sank in Cook Inlet on the south-central coast of Alaska 6 nautical miles (11 km; 6.9 mi) off the mouth of the Kenai River after a large wave broke over her stern.

=== 29 July ===
List of shipwrecks: 29 July 1985
Ship	State	Description
Kapodistrias	Greece	The bulk carrier ran aground at Port Elizabeth and sank.

== August ==
=== 3 August ===
List of shipwrecks: 3 August 1985
Ship	State	Description
Europa	West Germany	The cruise ship ran aground off Greenland. Refloated on 6 August, returned to service.
HMS Narwhal	Royal Navy	The decommissioned Porpoise-class submarine was scuttled in the English Channel to serve as a target.

=== 7 August ===
List of shipwrecks: 7 August 1985
Ship	State	Description
Sea Dancer	United States	The 90-foot (27.4 m) barge tender sank with the loss of one life after taking on water in heavy weather 60 nautical miles (110 km; 69 mi) north of False Pass, Alaska.

=== 10 August ===
List of shipwrecks: 10 August 1985
Ship	State	Description
K-431	Soviet Navy	The Project 675 (Echo II-class) submarine suffered an explosion in her nuclear reactor during refuelling. Ten people killed.

=== 18 August ===
List of shipwrecks: 18 August 1985
Ship	State	Description
Maritime Gardenia	Liberia	The cargo ship ran aground on the Albert Patches, in the Torres Strait (10°20′05″S 102°21′01″E). She was on a voyage from Newcastle, New South Wales, Australia to Penang, Malaysia. Subsequently refloated and towed to Singapore for repairs.
Naess Leopard	Belgium	Hit by two missiles 25 nautical miles (46 km) north east of Qatar and damaged by the detonation of one of them. Later repaired and returned to service.

=== 19 August ===
List of shipwrecks: 19 August 1985
Ship	State	Description
Western Sea	United States	The 58-foot (17.7 m) seiner was lost in Marmot Bay, 25 nautical miles (46 km; 29 mi) northeast of Kodiak, Alaska. Her entire crew of six perished. Parts of Western Sea including her pilot house, as well as a life preserver, later were found east of Long Island in the Alexander Archipelago in Southeast Alaska.

=== 21 August ===
List of shipwrecks: 21 August 1985
Ship	State	Description
Anna Marie	United States	The 42-foot (12.8 m) fishing vessel was destroyed by fire near Chignik, Alaska. All on board survived.
Lady Noreen	United States	The fish tender was destroyed by an electrical fire near Cape Chacon (54°41′30″N 132°00′50″W) in Southeast Alaska southwest of Ketchikan, Alaska.

=== 25 August ===
List of shipwrecks: 25 August 1985
Ship	State	Description
Ariadne	Panama	Ran aground off Mogadishu, Somalia and broke in two, a total loss. Bow section capsized and sank on 1 October, causing parts of Mogadishu to be evacuated.

=== 31 August ===
List of shipwrecks: 31 August 1985
Ship	State	Description
Boston Sterling	United Kingdom	The 39.3-metre (129 ft), 387-ton trawler struck an unseen rock off Loch Broom and began to flood. Most of her crew abandoned ship, with the skipper, first mate, and engineer staying to try to save her. She drifted ashore on Tanera More (58°00′N 05°24′W) and was abandoned, a total wreck.

== September ==
=== 6 September ===
List of shipwrecks: 6 September 1985
Ship	State	Description
Pacific Lady	United States	During a voyage from Yakutat to Sitka, Alaska, while operating as a fish tender with a cargo of 80,000 pounds (36,288 kg) of salmon on board, the 70-foot (21.3 m) fishing vessel capsized and sank off Cape Spencer, Alaska. One crewman died after helping his shipmates onto a life raft; the other four men and the only woman on board survived and were rescued by a United States Coast Guard helicopter.

=== 13 September ===
List of shipwrecks: 13 September 1985
Ship	State	Description
Smit Matsas 1	Greece	Iran–Iraq War: The salvage tug was hit by an Exocet missile fired by an Iraqi aircraft whilst at a point 50 nautical miles (93 km) north of Ras Tunara, Saudi Arabia. The ship was destroyed by the subsequent fire, all 19 crew were rescued.

=== 21 September ===
List of shipwrecks: 21 September 1985
Ship	State	Description
Junquito	Spain	Western Sahara War: The trawler was captured by Polisario fighters and scuttled off Cape Corbiero, Western Sahara.

=== 25 September ===
List of shipwrecks: 25 September 1985
Ship	State	Description
Meltem	Turkish Navy	The Denizkusu-class missile boat was rammed, cut in two and sunk by Khasan (Soviet Navy) in the Bosporus Strait/Black Sea. Five crewmen were killed. The vessel was later salvaged and stricken.

=== 29 September ===
List of shipwrecks: 29 September 1985
Ship	State	Description
Taurime	Republic of Ireland	The yacht struck rocks off Valencia Head and sank. All crew rescued, including Charles Haughey, the Leader of the Opposition in the Irish Parliament.

== October ==
=== 16 October ===
List of shipwrecks: 16 October 1985
Ship	State	Description
General VII	United Kingdom	The tug sank after colliding with Rora Head (United Kingdom) in the Thames Estuary. Four of her seven crew were killed.

=== 20 October ===
List of shipwrecks: 20 October 1985
Ship	State	Description
Unidentified infiltration ship	Korean People's Navy	An infiltration ship was sunk by South Korean coastal artillery.

=== 26 October ===
List of shipwrecks: 26 October 1985
Ship	State	Description
Carolyn Jean	United States	The 98-foot (29.9 m) fishing trawler dragged her anchor and sank in shallow water in Portage Bay (57°34′05″N 156°02′15″W) on the south coast of the Alaska Peninsula in Alaska. A United States Coast Guard helicopter rescued her crew of four.

=== 28 October ===
List of shipwrecks: 28 October 1985
Ship	State	Description
Sundowner	United States	The 68-foot (21 m) fishing vessel sank in bad weather in the Gulf of Alaska near the Semidi Islands south of Kodiak Island. Her captain was lost, but the United States Coast Guard rescued the other three members of her crew from a life raft.

=== 29 October ===
List of shipwrecks: 29 October 1985
Ship	State	Description
Hornbelt	West Germany	The cargo vessel was damaged in a collision with Algol (West Germany). Salvaged, repaired, and returned to service after being sold.

=== 30 October ===
List of shipwrecks: 30 October 1985
Ship	State	Description
Golden Hinde	United Kingdom	The replica of the 16th-century galleon ran aground at the mouth of the Avon. Refloated the following day.

=== 31 October ===
List of shipwrecks: 31 October 1985
Ship	State	Description
Boston Sterling	United Kingdom	The 39.14-metre (128.4 ft) fishing vessel sprang a leak and sank at the mouth of Loch Broom, off Tanera Mòr, Summer Isles.

=== Unknown date ===
List of shipwrecks: Unknown date 1985
Ship	State	Description
Unidentified patrol ship	Korean People's Navy	A patrol ship was sunk by South Korean coastal artillery.

== November ==
=== 5 November ===
List of shipwrecks: 5 November 1985
Ship	State	Description
Canaria	Spain	The 342-metre (1,122 ft) oil tanker was hit by an Iraqi Exocet missile at 28°10′N 51°00′E during the Iran-Iraq war. Deemed a total loss, she was sold off, renamed Canari, and towed to Kaoshiung for scrapping. At noon on 11 August 1986, Canari exploded while undergoing scrapping, resulting in 16 deaths and more than 100 injured.

=== 11 November ===
List of shipwrecks: 11 November 1985
Ship	State	Description
Anne	Netherlands	The coaster was driven ashore at Seaton Carew, Northumberland in a storm. Still beached four days later.

=== 17 November ===
List of shipwrecks: 17 November 1985
Ship	State	Description
Rascal	United States	The retired 41-foot (12.5 m) fishing vessel and dive boat was scuttled as an artificial reef in 40 feet (12 m) of water in Long Island Sound off Matinecock Point (40.9020°N 073.6323°W) on the north coast of Long Island, New York.

=== 18 November ===
List of shipwrecks: 18 November 1985
Ship	State	Description
Morania Abaco	United States	The retired 264-foot (80.5 m) tanker was scuttled as an artificial reef in 110 feet (34 m) of water in the North Atlantic Ocean east of Ocean City, New Jersey, at 39°14.133′N 074°12.154′W.

=== 26 November ===
List of shipwrecks: 26 November 1985
Ship	State	Description
Aleutian Harvester	United States	The 94-foot (28.7 m) fishing trawler disappeared in the North Pacific Ocean during a storm with the loss of her entire crew of three. Searchers believed that she sank approximately 30 nautical miles (56 km; 35 mi) south of Unalaska in the Aleutian Islands.

== December ==
=== 6 December ===
List of shipwrecks: 6 December 1985
Ship	State	Description
Pacific Voyager	United States	The crab-fishing vessel struck a rock off Cape Pankof on Unimak Island in the Aleutian Islands and then went aground and broke up on the beach. A United States Coast Guard helicopter rescued her entire crew of four.

=== 16 December ===
List of shipwrecks: 16 December 1985
Ship	State	Description
Princess Arline	United States	The fishing vessel sank in the Gulf of Alaska approximately 40 nautical miles (74 km; 46 mi) south of Seward, Alaska, during a gale. A United States Coast Guard helicopter rescued her crew from a life raft.

=== 18 December ===
List of shipwrecks: 18 December 1985
Ship	State	Description
Asuncion	Philippines	The ferry sank off Mindoro Island. About 100 of her 182 passengers and 15 crew were rescued.

=== 19 December ===
List of shipwrecks: 19 December 1985
Ship	State	Description
Eagle Tire Co	United States	The cargo ship was sunk as an artificial reef approximately 3 nautical miles (5.6 km) northeast of the Alligator Reef Light and 6 nautical miles (11 km) off the coast of Lower Matecumbe Key, Florida.

== Unknown date ==
List of shipwrecks: Unknown date 1985
Ship	State	Description
Malis	Unknown	The out of service coastal freighter was scuttled as an artificial reef near Little Pigeon Island in the Credner Islands near Rabaul, New Guinea.
Narciso Monturiol	Spanish Navy	The decommissioned submarine was scuttled off Cartagena, Spain.
HMS Porpoise	Royal Navy	The Porpoise-class submarine was sunk as a target.
Samir	Lebanon	The ship was lost during 1985.
