= Brazilian ship Duque de Caxias =

Brazilian ship Duque de Caxias may refer to one of the following ships of the Brazilian Navy named after Luís Alves de Lima e Silva, Duke of Caxias:

- Brazilian transport Duque de Caxias (U11), a World War II era transport ship acquired in 1945; as Orizaba, launched in 1917, was a transport for the United States Navy during World War I and World War II; remained in Brazilian service until 1959; scrapped in 1963
- Brazilian landing ship Duque de Caxias (G26), a tank landing ship from her 1973 acquisition to 2000; the former De Soto County-class USS Grant Country (LST-1174), launched in 1956
