= HMS Rorqual (S02) =

Porpoise-class submarine of the Royal Navy

- HMS Rorqual (S02)

History

United Kingdom
- Name: HMS Rorqual
- Builder: Vickers-Armstrongs, Barrow-in-Furness
- Laid down: 15 January 1955
- Launched: 5 December 1956
- Fate: Arrived for scrapping on 5 May 1977

General characteristics
- Class & type: Porpoise-class submarine
- Displacement: 2,080 tons surfaced; 2,450 tons submerged
- Length: 290 ft (88 m)
- Beam: 26 ft 7 in (8.10 m)
- Draught: 18 ft (5.5 m)
- Propulsion: 2 × Admiralty Standard range diesel generators, 1,650 hp (1.230 MW); 2 × English Electric main motors, 12,000 hp (8.95 MW); 2 shafts
- Speed: 12 kn (22 km/h) surfaced; 17 kn (31 km/h)submerged
- Range: 9,000 nmi (17,000 km) at 12 kn (22 km/h)
- Complement: 71
- Armament: 8 × 21 inch (533 mm) torpedo tubes, 6 bow, 2 stern; 30 × Mk8 or Mk23 torpedoes, later the Mark 24 Tigerfish

HMS Rorqual (S02) was a Porpoise-class submarine launched in 1956. She was built by the Vickers shipyard in Barrow-in-Furness, Cumbria, England. The boat was named for both the rorqual, a family of whale, and the earlier Second World War-era submarine of the same name.

== Design and construction ==
The Porpoise-class was the first class of operational submarines built for the Royal Navy after the end of the Second World War, and were designed to take advantage of experience gained by studying German Type XXI U-boats and British wartime experiments with the submarine Seraph, which was modified by streamlining and fitting a bigger battery.

The Porpoise-class submarines were 290 feet 3 inches (88.47 m) long overall and 241 feet 0 inches (73.46 m) between perpendiculars, with a beam of 26 feet 6 inches (8.08 m) and a draught of 18 feet 3 inches (5.56 m). Displacement was 1,565 long tons (1,590 t) standard and 1,975 long tons (2,007 t) full load surfaced and 2,303 long tons (2,340 t) submerged. Propulsion machinery consisted of two Admiralty Standard Range diesel generators rated at a total of 3,680 brake horsepower (2,740 kW), which could charge the submarine's batteries or directly drive the electric motors. These were rated at 6,000 shaft horsepower (4,500 kW), and drove two shafts, giving a speed of 12 knots (14 mph; 22 km/h) on the surface and 16 knots (18 mph; 30 km/h) submerged. Eight 21 inch (533 mm) torpedo tubes were fitted; six in the bow, and two in the stern. Up to 30 torpedoes could be carried, with the initial outfit consisting of the unguided Mark 8 and the homing Mark 20 torpedoes.

Rorqual was laid down at Vickers-Armstrongs' Barrow-in-Furness shipyard on 15 January 1955, was launched on 5 December 1956 and completed on 24 October 1958.

== Service ==
In 1958, Rorqual experienced a fire.

In February 1960, Rorqual visited the Mediterranean, calling at La Spezia in Italy and Nice in southern France before returning home to Faslane at the end of the month. In 1963, she was caught in a trawler's net. An explosion in 1966 killed one junior rate and injured the chief of the watch, who died ashore at Inhambane, Rorqual was off the coast of Mozambique en route to Singapore. In 1969, Rorqual rammed a moored minesweeper, USS Endurance (MSO-435) while docking at River Point pier in Subic Bay, Philippines. The collision punched a large hole in Endurance's hull but did not damage Rorqual. At the time of the incident, Rorqual was commanded by Lieutenant-Commander Gavin Menzies who retired the following year and later published the controversial book 1421: The Year China Discovered America.

Rorqual won the SOCA Efficiency trophy in 1973.

Rorqual arrived at the Laira breaker's yard near Plymouth on 5 May 1977. She was broken up by Davies & Cann.

== Sources ==
- Blackman, Raymond V. B. (1971). Jane's Fighting Ships 1971–72. London: Sampson Low, Marston & Company. ISBN 0-354-00096-9.
- Brown, David K. (2012). Nelson to Vanguard: Warship Design and Development 1923–1945. Barnsley, UK: Seaforth Publishing. ISBN 978-1-84832-149-6.
- Brown, David K.; Moore, David (2012). Rebuilding the Royal Navy: Warship Design Since 1945. Barnsley, UK: Seaforth Publishing. ISBN 978-1-84832-150-2.
- Colledge, J. J.; Warlow, Ben (2006) [1969]. Ships of the Royal Navy: The Complete Record of All Fighting Ships of the Royal Navy from the 15th Century to the Present (3rd Rev ed.). London: Chatham Publishing. ISBN 978-1-86176-281-8. OCLC 67375475.
- Gardiner, Robert; Chumbley, Stephen, eds. (1995). Conway's All The World's Fighting Ships 1947–1995. Annapolis, Maryland, USA: Naval Institute Press. ISBN 1-55750-132-7.
- Hennesey, Peter; Jinks, James (2016). The Silent Deep: The Royal Navy Submarine Service since 1945. Penguin. ISBN 978-0-241-95948-0.
