= Sam Salt =

Royal Navy Rear Admiral (1940-2009)

Rear Admiral Sam Salt CB
- Born: 19 April 1940
- Died: 3 December 2009 (aged 69)
- Military career
- Allegiance: United Kingdom
- Branch: Royal Navy
- Service years: 1958–91
- Rank: Rear Admiral
- Nickname: "Sam"
- Commands: HMS Southampton (1983–84); HMS Sheffield (1982); HMS Dreadnought (1978–79); HMS Finwhale (1969–71)
- Conflicts: Falklands War; Gulf War
- Awards: Companion of the Order of the Bath

Rear Admiral James Frederick Thomas George "Sam" Salt, CB (19 April 1940 – 3 December 2009) was a senior Royal Navy officer of the late twentieth century. He was the captain of HMS Sheffield during the Falklands War, the first British warship to be sunk by enemy action since the end of the Second World War.

== Early life ==
James Salt was born on 19 April 1940 in Yeovil in the county of Somerset. He was the son of Lillian and a Royal Naval officer, Lieutenant Commander George S. Salt who was lost in action in the Gulf of Taranto six months after his son's birth while in command of the submarine HMS Triad during the Second World War. Lillian later remarried another Royal Navy officer and James was raised in a military household.

== Naval career ==
Salt received his early education at Wellington College, in the county of Berkshire. On enlisting in the Royal Navy he received a commission as an officer after passing through the Britannia Royal Naval College (1958–1959).

After an early career on surface vessels in the 1960s serving in the Far East, Mediterranean Sea and Atlantic Ocean, Salt volunteered for the sub-surface duty in which his father had lost his life. He commanded the submarine HMS Finwhale (1969–1971), was executive officer of HMS Resolution (1973–1974), and commanded HMS Dreadnought (1978–1979).

=== Falklands War ===
Salt was in command of the destroyer HMS Sheffield on 4 May 1982, when she was attacked and destroyed by Argentinian naval aircraft whilst on patrol in the South Atlantic Ocean during the war over the contested sovereignty of the Falkland Islands. Sheffield was one of three vessels guarding the western flank of the British naval force when they were attacked. Two Argentinian Dassault-Breguet Super Étendard strike aircraft attacked the vessels using Exocet missiles. One struck the ship, causing a fire. Salt and the crew attempted to save the ship, but they were forced to abandon ship. Sheffield was taken in tow, but sank several days later, becoming the first Royal Navy warship to be sunk since the end of the Second World War.

=== Senior command ===
After the Falklands War he commanded the destroyer HMS Southampton. In the mid-1980s his sea-going career came to an end and he became a Naval Staff Officer, holding the post of Assistant Chief of Staff (Operations) at Northwood. While at Northwood, he planned naval operations worldwide including Persian Gulf and the Falkland Islands operations, the evacuation of British nationals from Lebanon and the 1985 removal of naval mines from the Red Sea. He then became Director of Defence Intelligence (1986–1987), at which time he was elevated to rear admiral's rank, and was subsequently the senior Naval representative at the Royal College of Defence Studies. While he was Assistant Chief of the Naval Staff he was responsible for the Royal Navy's planning for the execution of the Gulf War.

== Retirement ==
After he retired from the navy in June 1991, Salt worked in a managerial capacity in a number of defence-related export, sales and marketing roles in the private sector, retiring from this work in 2005. Salt died aged 69 on 3 December 2009 of cancer.

== Personal life ==
Salt married Penelope M. Walker in 1975, and had four sons. In 1991, Salt was named Companion of the Order of the Bath.
