= HMS Finwhale =

Submarine of the Royal Navy

- HMS Finwhale (S05)

History

United Kingdom
- Name: HMS Finwhale
- Builder: Cammell Laird, Birkenhead
- Launched: 21 July 1959
- Commissioned: 19 August 1960
- Fate: Scrapped in 1988

General characteristics
- Class & type: Porpoise-class submarine
- Displacement: 2,080 tons surfaced; 2,450 tons submerged
- Length: 290 ft (88 m)
- Beam: 26 ft 7 in (8.10 m)
- Draught: 18 ft (5.5 m)
- Propulsion: 2 × Admiralty Standard range diesel generators, 1,650 hp (1,230 kW); 2 × English Electric main motors, 12,000 hp (8,900 kW); 2 shafts
- Speed: 12 knots (22 km/h) surfaced; 17 knots (31 km/h)submerged
- Range: 9,000 nmi (17,000 km) at 12 kn (22 km/h)
- Complement: 71
- Armament: 8 × 21-inch (533 mm) torpedo tubes, 6 bow, 2 stern; 30 × Mk 8 or Mk 23 torpedoes, later the Mark 24 Tigerfish

HMS Finwhale (S05) was the fifth Porpoise-class submarine of the Royal Navy. She was launched on 21 July 1959 and first commissioned on 19 August 1960.

== Operational service ==
During her first commission she went further under the ice than any other submarine at the time. She was recommissioned on 27 January 1964. In March 1965 on her second Arctic patrol she further eclipsed her first ice patrol, penetrating 95 miles into the ice. She was present at Portsmouth Navy Days in 1965 and 1966.

While in the Far East she was fitted with an Oerlikon deck gun.

She was used as a harbour training vessel between 1979 and 1987. She left under tow for scrapping in Spain on 28 March 1988. She has been the only ship of the Royal Navy to be named after the fin whale.

== Publications ==
- Colledge, J. J.; Warlow, Ben (2006) [1969]. Ships of the Royal Navy: The Complete Record of All Fighting Ships of the Royal Navy from the 15th Century to the Present (3rd Rev ed.). London: Chatham Publishing. ISBN 978-1-86176-281-8. OCLC 67375475.
