= HMS Porpoise (S01) =

1956 Porpoise-class submarine of the Royal Navy

- HMS Porpoise (S01)

History

United Kingdom
- Name: HMS Porpoise
- Builder: Vickers-Armstrongs, Barrow-in-Furness
- Launched: 25 April 1956
- Commissioned: 17 April 1958
- Decommissioned: 1982
- Fate: Sunk as a target in 1985

General characteristics
- Class & type: Porpoise class submarine
- Displacement: 2,080 tons surfaced; 2,450 tons submerged
- Length: 290 ft (88 m)
- Beam: 26 ft 7 in (8.10 m)
- Draught: 18 ft (5.5 m)
- Propulsion: 2 × Admiralty Standard range diesel generators, 1,650 hp (1.230 MW); 2 × English Electric main motors, 12,000 hp (8.95 MW); 2 shafts
- Speed: 12 kn (22 km/h) surfaced; 17 kn (31 km/h)submerged
- Range: 9,000 nmi (17,000 km) at 12 kn (22 km/h)
- Complement: 71
- Armament: 8 × 21 inch (533 mm) torpedo tubes, 6 bow, 2 stern; 30 × Mk8 or Mk23 torpedoes, later the Mark 24 Tigerfish

HMS Porpoise (S01) was a Porpoise-class submarine of the Royal Navy. She was launched on 25 April 1956, commissioned on 17 April 1958, and was decommissioned in 1982. Finally, she was sunk as a target in 1985 in torpedo trials, for which purpose she was painted bright red.

She had been used as a training target while still serving with the Navy; in 1979 her casing, ballast tanks and vents were reinforced so that unarmed torpedoes could be fired at her without the risk of sinking.

In 2000, a glacier in East Greenland was named after her

== Accidents and incidents ==
Notable accidents involving HMS Porpoise

- 18 October 1963: Suffered superficial damage departing Portsmouth harbour after colliding with the aircraft carrier HMS Centaur.
- 1 January 1969 - Entangled in the nets of the French trawler Belle Poule.
- 18 April 1982 - HMS Porpoise became entangled in the fishing nets of the Irish trawler Sharelga. The Sharelga, after travelling backwards two miles for twenty minutes, capsized and sank.

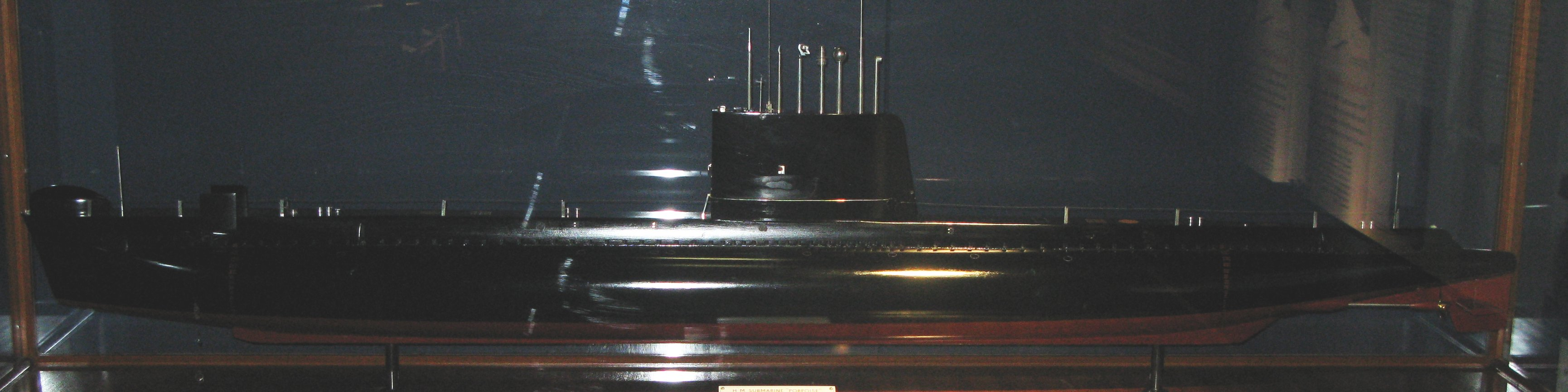
A model of HMS Porpoise
