= Graham County =

Graham County is the name of three counties in the United States:

- Graham County, Arizona
- Graham County, Kansas
- Graham County, North Carolina

Graham County is the name of the USS GRAHAM COUNTY LST-1176.
