= HMS Sealion (S07) =

Submarine of the Royal Navy

- HMS Sealion (S07)

History

United Kingdom
- Name: HMS Sealion (S07)
- Namesake: Sealion
- Builder: Cammell Laird
- Laid down: 5 June 1958
- Launched: 31 December 1959
- Commissioned: 25 July 1961
- Decommissioned: December 1987
- Fate: Scrapped 1990

General characteristics
- Class & type: Porpoise-class submarine
- Displacement: 2,080 tons (2,113 tonnes) surfaced, 2,450 tons (2,489 tonnes) dived
- Length: 88.4 m (290 ft)
- Beam: 8.1 m (26.5 ft)
- Draught: 5.5 m (18 ft)
- Propulsion: Two ASR 16VVS AS21 diesel generators totalling 3680 bhp (2,740 kW), two English Electric main motors totalling 12000 hp (895 kW) driving two shafts, two 880 V batteries each of 224 cells
- Speed: 12 knots (22 km/h) surfaced, 17 knots (31 km/h) dived
- Complement: 64 officers and men
- Armament: 6 x 21 inch (533 mm) bow torpedo tubes, 2 x 21 inch (533 mm) stern torpedo tubes; 30 torpedoes could be carried (usually Mk8 or Mk23) or mines

HMS Sealion (S07) was a Porpoise-class submarine.

== Design and construction ==
The Porpoise class was the first class of operational submarines built for the Royal Navy after the end of the Second World War, and were designed to take advantage of experience gained by studying German Type XXI U-boats and British wartime experiments with the submarine Seraph, which was modified by streamlining and fitting a bigger battery.

The Porpoise-class submarines were 290 feet 3 inches (88.47 m) long overall and 241 feet 0 inches (73.46 m) between perpendiculars, with a beam of 26 feet 6 inches (8.08 m) and a draught of 18 feet 3 inches (5.56 m). Displacement was 1,565 long tons (1,590 t) standard and 1,975 long tons (2,007 t) full load surfaced and 2,303 long tons (2,340 t) submerged. Propulsion machinery consisted of two Admiralty Standard Range diesel generators rated at a total of 3,680 brake horsepower (2,740 kW), which could charge the submarine's batteries or directly drive the electric motors. These were rated at 6,000 shaft horsepower (4,500 kW), and drove two shafts, giving a speed of 12 knots (14 mph; 22 km/h) on the surface and 16 knots (18 mph; 30 km/h) submerged. Eight 21-inch (533 mm) torpedo tubes were fitted; six in the bow, and two in the stern. Up to 30 torpedoes could be carried, with the initial outfit consisting of the unguided Mark 8 and the homing Mark 20 torpedoes.

Sealion was laid down on 5 June 1958 by Cammell Laird at their Birkenhead shipyard. She was launched on 31 December 1959, and completed on 25 July 1961, being assigned the Pennant number S 07.

== Service ==
In 1963 Sealion was carrying out surveillance operations against a Soviet naval exercise when she was detected by Soviet warships and forced to surface. Between 1976 and 1977 she was commanded by J K Boyle. Sealion attended the 1977 Silver Jubilee Fleet Review off Spithead when she was part of the Submarine Flotilla.

In late 1986–1987 Sealion was deployed to the South Atlantic, carrying out patrols from the Falkland Islands before visiting Chile and returning to Britain via the Caribbean. Upon her return, Sealion returned flying a Jolly Roger, a traditional act of Royal Navy submarines after a kill, suggesting that she was involved in a special forces related operation. She was paid off in December 1987 and sold to an Education Trust for deprived inner-city youngsters "Inter Action", arriving at Chatham on 22 June 1988.

She was broken up in 1990.

== Publications ==
- Blackman, Raymond V. B. (1971). Jane's Fighting Ships 1971–72. London: Sampson Low, Marston & Company. ISBN 0-354-00096-9.
- Brown, David K. (2012). Nelson to Vanguard: Warship Design and Development 1923–1945. Barnsley, UK: Seaforth Publishing. ISBN 978-1-84832-149-6.
- Brown, David K.; Moore, David (2012). Rebuilding the Royal Navy: Warship Design Since 1945. Barnsley, UK: Seaforth Publishing. ISBN 978-1-84832-150-2.
- Colledge, J. J.; Warlow, Ben (2006) [1969]. Ships of the Royal Navy: The Complete Record of All Fighting Ships of the Royal Navy from the 15th Century to the Present (3rd Rev ed.). London: Chatham Publishing. ISBN 978-1-86176-281-8. OCLC 67375475.
- Gardiner, Robert; Chumbley, Stephen, eds. (1995). Conway's All The World's Fighting Ships 1947–1995. Annapolis, Maryland, USA: Naval Institute Press. ISBN 1-55750-132-7.
- Hennessy, Peter; Jinks, James (2016). The Silent Deep: The Royal Navy Submarine Service since 1945. Penguin. ISBN 978-0-241-95948-0.
