= USS Grant County =

1956 De Soto County-class tank landing ship

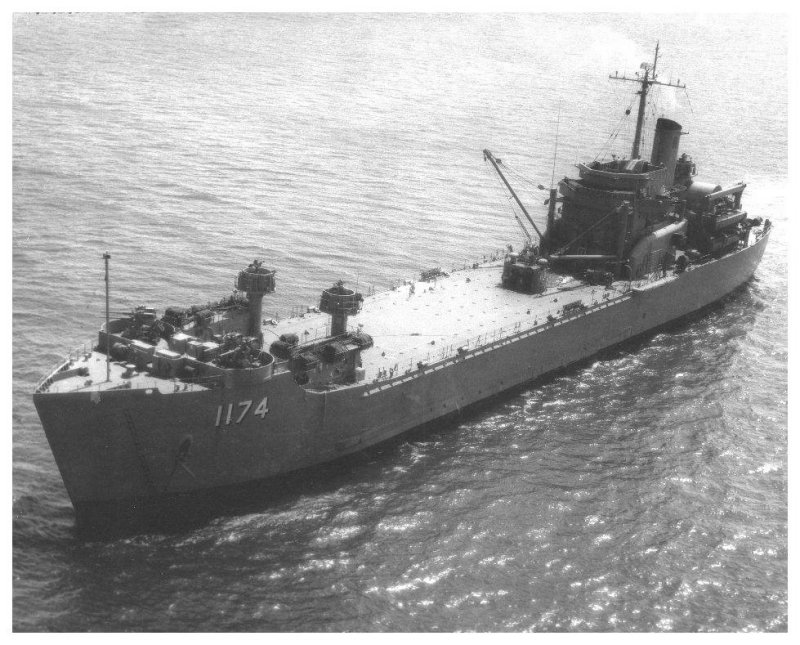
- USS Grant County (LST-1174)

History

United States
- Name: USS Grant County
- Namesake: Grant County
- Builder: Avondale Marine Ways, Inc., Avondale, Louisiana
- Laid down: 15 March 1956
- Launched: 12 October 1956
- Commissioned: 17 December 1957
- Decommissioned: 15 January 1973
- Stricken: 30 December 1977
- Fate: Loaned to the Brazilian Navy, 15 January 1973; Sold to Brazil, 1 February 1980

History

Brazil
- Name: Duque de Caxias (G26)
- Acquired: 15 January 1973
- Decommissioned: 8 February 2000
- Fate: Unknown

General characteristics
- Class & type: De Soto County-class tank landing ship
- Displacement: 3,560 long tons (3,617 t) light; 7,823 long tons (7,949 t) full load
- Length: 446 ft (136 m)
- Beam: 62 ft (19 m)
- Draft: 17 ft (5.2 m)
- Propulsion: 6 × [Fairbanks] diesel engines, two shafts, fixedpitch propellers
- Speed: 17 knots (31 km/h; 20 mph)
- Boats & landing craft carried: 4 LCVPs
- Capacity: 28 medium tanks or vehicles to 75 tons on 288 ft (88 m) tank deck; 100,000 gal (US) diesel or jet fuel, plus 7,000 gal fuel for embarked vehicles
- Troops: 706 officers and enlisted men
- Complement: 124 officers and enlisted men
- Armament: 3 × twin 3"/50 caliber gun mounts

USS Grant County (LST-1174) was a De Soto County-class tank landing ship built for the United States Navy during the late 1950s. Named after counties in fifteen states, she was the only U.S. Naval vessel to bear the name.

Grant County was designed under project SCB 119 and laid down by Avondale Marine Ways, Inc. of Avondale, Louisiana 15 March 1956; launched 12 October 1956; sponsored by Mrs. John Martin Higgins; and commissioned 17 December 1957.

== Service history ==
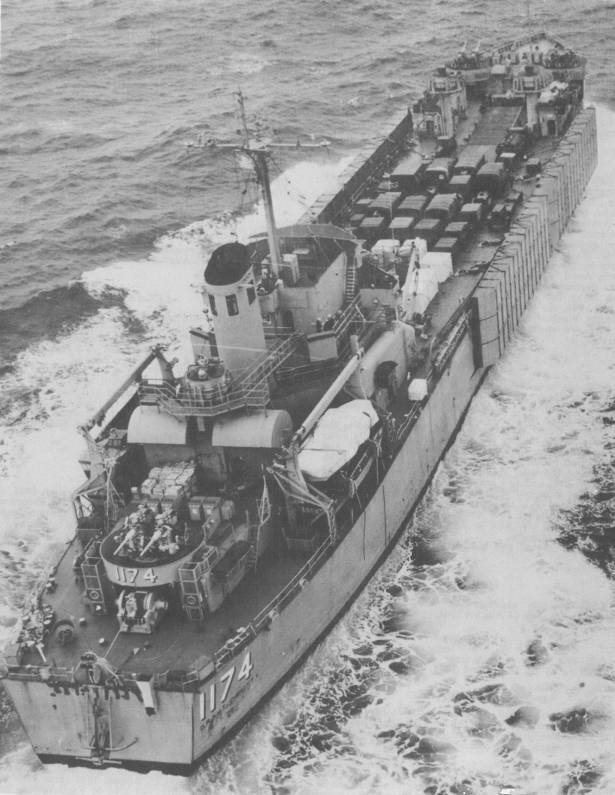
USS Grant County (LST-1174), with pontoon causeway sections stowed along her sides.

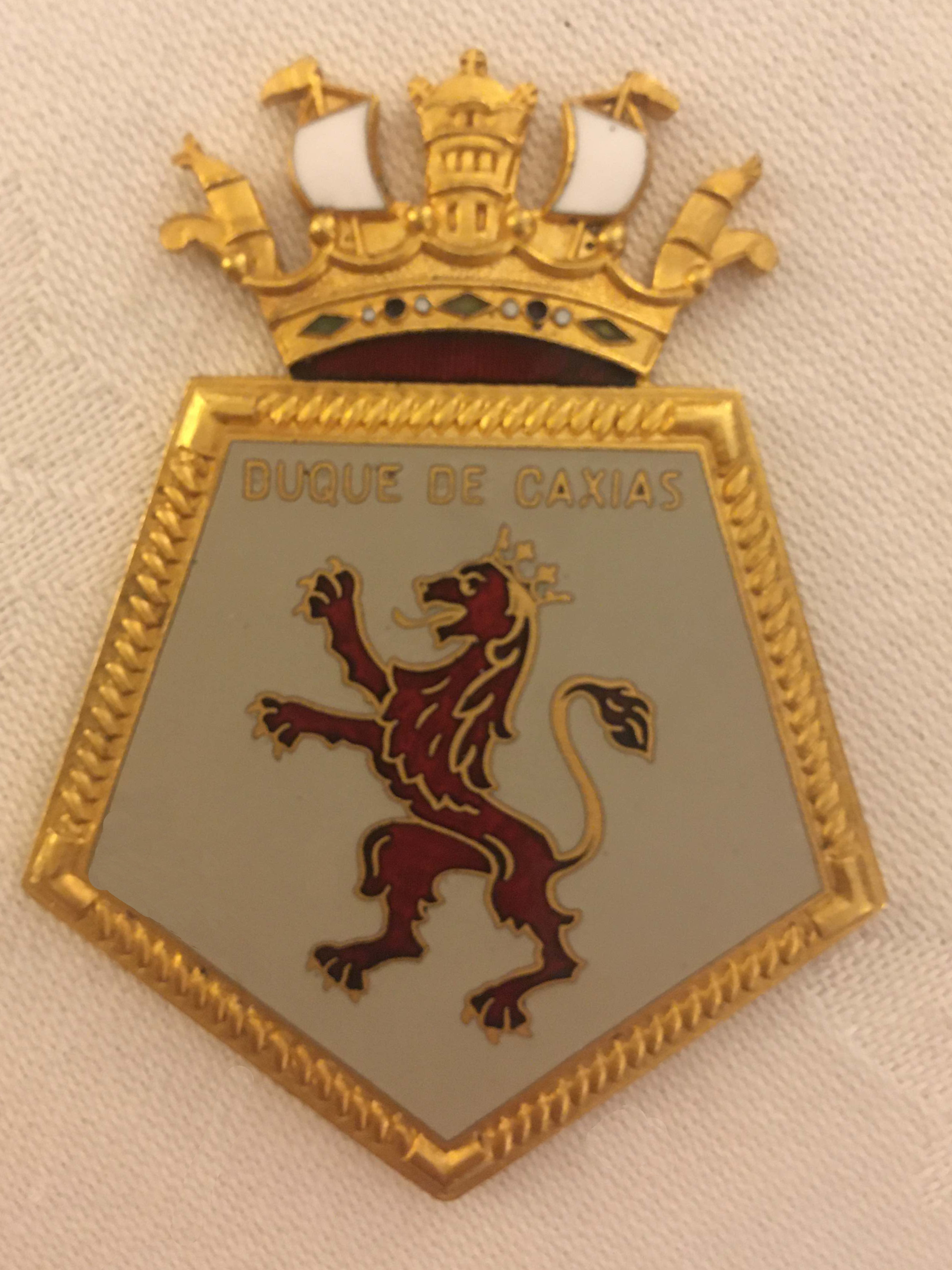
Badge of the Brazilian navy ship Duque de Caxias (ex USS Grant County)

=== 1958–1964 ===
After shakedown, Grant County performed amphibious exercises along the Atlantic coast and in the Caribbean throughout 1958. From 1958 to 1962 the LST excelled in training and experimental amphibious operations in the Atlantic, Caribbean, and on two occasions the Mediterranean. Following operations with Marines at Camp Pendleton in October, 1962 Grant County was dispatched to Florida for assignment during the Cuban Missile Crisis. When the crisis eased, Grant County resumed her training, and remained on alert in the event of another flare-up.

=== 1965–1966 ===
President Lyndon B. Johnson ordered marines to intervene in the Dominican Civil War. U.S. forces began to withdraw in May 1965. Grant County departed Little Creek, Virginia 1 June for the Caribbean. She embarked Marines and Seabees stationed in the Dominican Republic and returned them to the United States. On 3 October she sailed for another Mediterranean deployment and participated in amphibious exercises before returning home 31 March 1966. During the next four months Grant County participated in intermittent amphibious exercises along the Atlantic Coast and in the Caribbean. During August she made two runs to the Dominican Republic to return troops and equipment to the United States. She continued shuttle runs along the East Coast until 1 December when she began a three-month overhaul.

=== 1967–1972 ===
In March, 1967 she resumed training and readiness operations with amphibious forces, and ranged the seas from the Virginia Capes to the Caribbean and the Mediterranean while maintaining the efficiency and readiness of her crew and equipment.

=== Decommissioning and sale ===
Decommissioned on 15 January 1973, Grant County was transferred to the Brazilian Navy that same date where she served as Duque de Caxias (G-26). Struck from the Naval Vessel Register 30 December 1977, she was sold to Brazil under the Security Assistance Program 1 February 1980. Decommissioned by the Brazilian Navy on 8 February 2000, her final fate was being sold to a Brazilian shipping company- shortly after that it was towed to India and scrapped on a beach.
