= HMS Cachalot (S06) =

Submarine of the Royal Navy

- HMS Cachalot (S06)

History

United Kingdom
- Builder: Scotts Shipbuilding and Engineering Company, Greenock
- Cost: £2,340,000
- Laid down: 1 August 1955
- Launched: 11 December 1957
- Commissioned: 1 September 1959
- Fate: Sold for scrap, 12 November 1979

General characteristics
- Displacement: 2,080 tons surfaced; 2,450 tons submerged
- Length: 290 ft (88 m)
- Beam: 26.5 ft (8.1 m)
- Draught: 18 ft (5.5 m)
- Propulsion: 2 × ASR 16VVS AS21 diesel generators totalling 3,680 bhp (2,740 kW); 2 × English Electric main motors totalling 12,000 hp (8,900 kW) driving two shafts; 2 × 880 V batteries each of 224 cells
- Speed: 12 knots surfaced, 17 knots submerged
- Complement: 64
- Armament: 6 × 21 inch (533 mm) bow torpedo tubes; 2 × 21 inch (533 mm) stern torpedo tubes; 30 torpedoes could be carried (usually Mk8 or Mk23) or mines

HMS Cachalot (S06) was a Porpoise-class submarine. Her keel was laid down on 1 August 1955 by Scotts Shipbuilding and Engineering Company at Greenock. She was launched on 11 December 1957, and commissioned on 1 September 1959.

== Design ==
The Porpoise class was the first class of operational submarines built for the Royal Navy after the end of the Second World War, and were designed to take advantage of experience gained by studying German Type XXI U-boats and British wartime experiments with the submarine Seraph, which was modified by streamlining and fitting a bigger battery.

The Porpoise-class submarines were 290 feet 3 inches (88.47 m) long overall and 241 feet 0 inches (73.46 m) between perpendiculars, with a beam of 26 feet 6 inches (8.08 m) and a draught of 18 feet 3 inches (5.56 m). Displacement was 1,565 long tons (1,590 t) standard and 1,975 long tons (2,007 t) full load surfaced and 2,303 long tons (2,340 t) submerged. Propulsion machinery consisted of two Admiralty Standard Range diesel generators rated at a total of 3,680 brake horsepower (2,740 kW), which could charge the submarine's batteries or directly drive the electric motors. These were rated at 6,000 shaft horsepower (4,500 kW), and drove two shafts, giving a speed of 12 knots (14 mph; 22 km/h) on the surface and 16 knots (18 mph; 30 km/h) submerged. Eight 21-inch (533 mm) torpedo tubes were fitted; six in the bow, and two in the stern. Up to 30 torpedoes could be carried, with the initial outfit consisting of the unguided Mark 8 and the homing Mark 20 torpedoes.

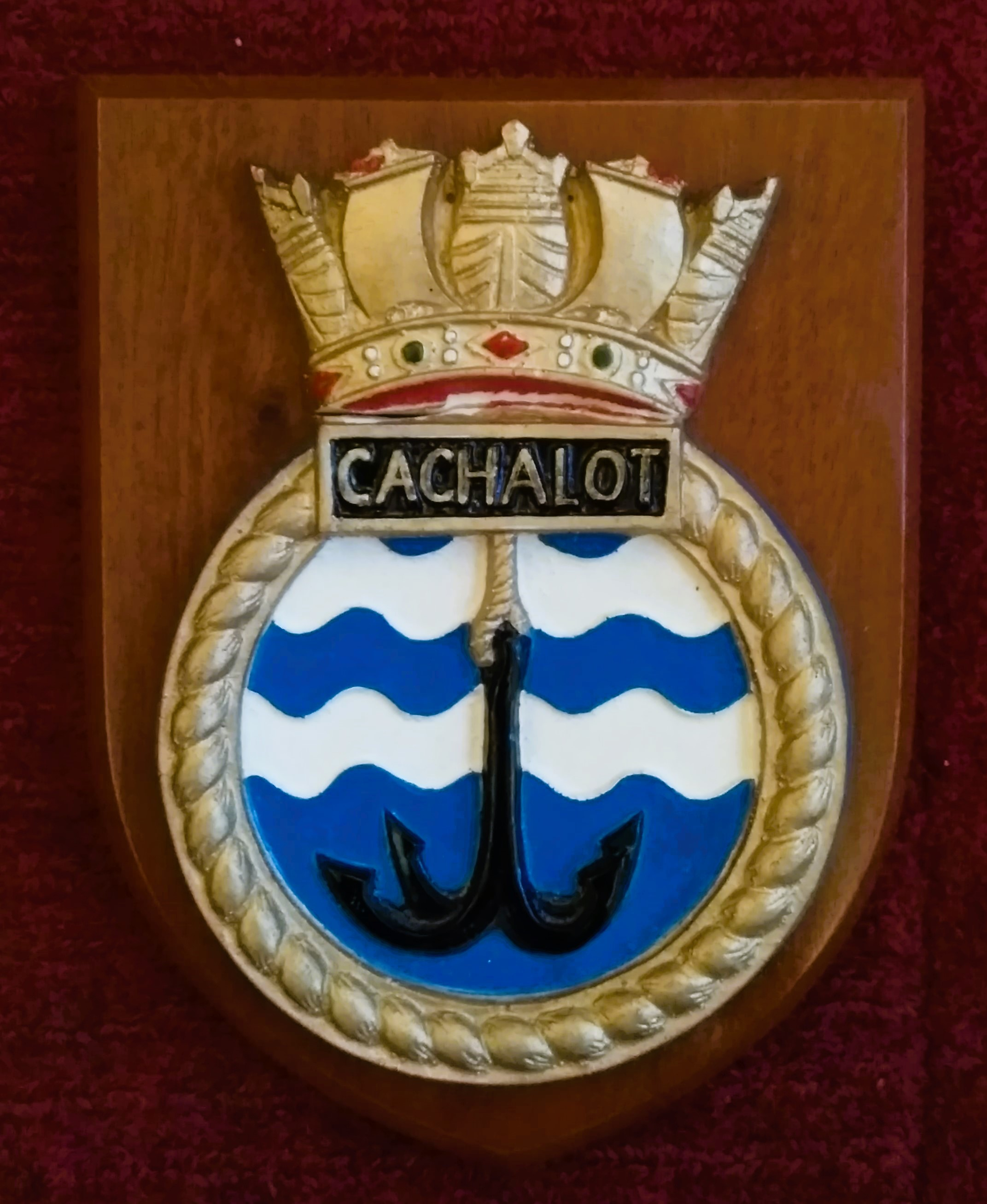
HMS Cachalot crest plaque presented whilst on visit to the Tyne / Blyth

== Service ==
Cachalot attended the 1977 Silver Jubilee Fleet Review off Spithead when she was part of the Submarine Flotilla.

She was sold on 12 November 1979 for breaking up at Blyth.

== Publications ==
- Blackman, Raymond V. B. (1971). Jane's Fighting Ships 1971–72. London: Sampson Low, Marston & Company. ISBN 0-354-00096-9.
- Brown, David K. (2012). Nelson to Vanguard: Warship Design and Development 1923–1945. Barnsley, UK: Seaforth Publishing. ISBN 978-1-84832-149-6.
- Brown, David K.; Moore, David (2012). Rebuilding the Royal Navy: Warship Design Since 1945. Barnsley, UK: Seaforth Publishing. ISBN 978-1-84832-150-2.
- Colledge, J. J.; Warlow, Ben (2006) [1969]. Ships of the Royal Navy: The Complete Record of All Fighting Ships of the Royal Navy from the 15th Century to the Present (3rd Rev ed.). London: Chatham Publishing. ISBN 978-1-86176-281-8. OCLC 67375475.
- Gardiner, Robert; Chumbley, Stephen, eds. (1995). Conway's All The World's Fighting Ships 1947–1995. Annapolis, Maryland, USA: Naval Institute Press. ISBN 1-55750-132-7.
