= USS Endurance (AM-435) =

Agile-class minesweeper of the United States Navy

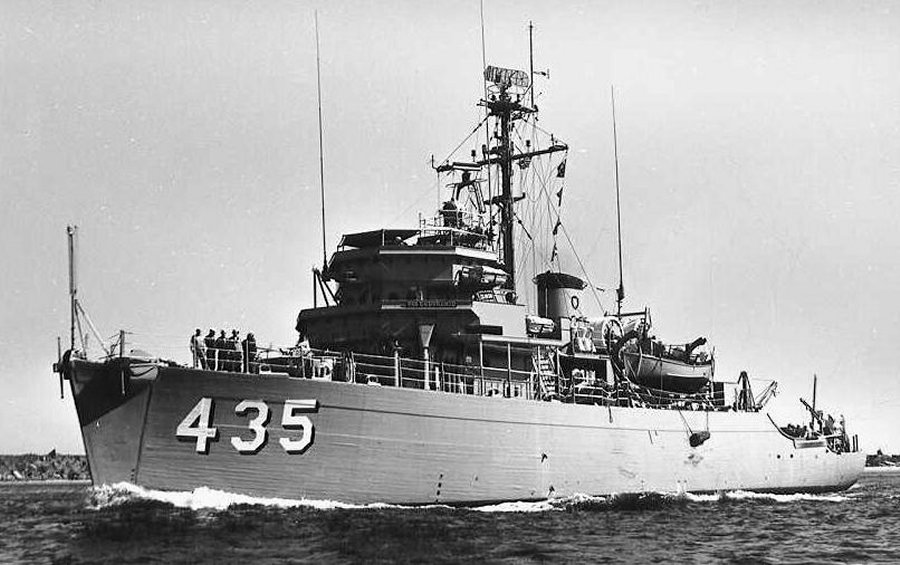

History

United States
- Laid down: 28 January 1952
- Launched: 8 August 1952
- Commissioned: 19 May 1954
- Decommissioned: 1 July 1972
- Stricken: 1 July 1972
- Home port: Long Beach, California
- Fate: Sold for scrapping, 1974

General characteristics
- Displacement: 620 tons
- Length: 172 ft (52 m)
- Beam: 36 ft (11 m)
- Draught: 10 ft (3.0 m)
- Speed: 16 knots
- Complement: 74
- Armament: one 40 mm mount

USS Endurance (AM-435/MSO-435) was an Agile-class minesweeper in service with the United States Navy from 1954 to 1972. She was scrapped in 1974.

== History ==
The second ship to be named Endurance by the Navy, AM-435 was launched 8 August 1952 by J. M. Martinac Shipbuilding Corp., Tacoma, Washington; sponsored by Miss Gerry A. Borovich; and commissioned 19 May 1954. She was reclassified MSO-435 on 7 February 1955.

On 21 April 1954, Endurance arrived at Long Beach, California, her home port, and began training operations along the southern coast of California. In July 1955 she made a good will cruise to Acapulco, Mexico, returning to local duty on exercises, drills, and operations with ships of other types.

Endurance made her first cruise to the Far East between August 1957 and February 1958, during which she exercised with ships of the Japanese Maritime Self Defense Force and the navy of the Republic of China. Her second tour of duty in the Far East, from January through July 1960, included minesweeping exercises at Okinawa, and another period of assistance to the Chinese navy in developing their modern mine warfare techniques. Arriving at Long Beach on 19 July, the remainder of the year was given to operations and ship overhaul.

On 13 June 1969, in Subic Bay, Philippines, USS Endurance was accidentally rammed by a Royal Navy submarine, HMS Rorqual (S02), resulting in minor damage.

In the Vietnam War, on the night of 22 November 1970, Endurance and Coast Guard cutters USCGC Rush and USCGC Sherman engaged and sank an enemy trawler near Vung Tao, South Vietnam. Lieutenant Commander Charles Schlegelmilch, the commander of Endurance, was awarded the Silver Star, and his crew received seven Bronze Stars, seven Navy Commendation Medals and nine Navy Achievement Medals.

Endurance was stricken 1 July 1972 and disposed of by Navy sale in December 1973.
