= USS Lorain County =

1957 De Soto County-class tank landing ship

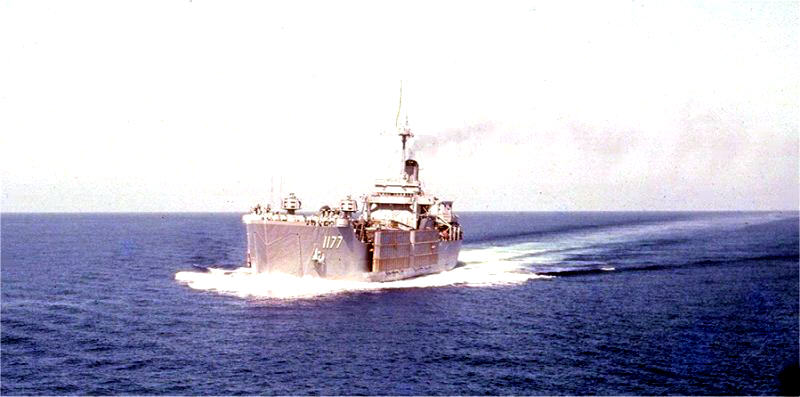
- Lorain County (LST-1177) approaches the Rankin (AKA-103) while underway in the Caribbean Sea, 12 May 1963

History

United States
- Name: USS Lorain County
- Namesake: Lorain County
- Builder: American Ship Building Company, Lorain, Ohio
- Laid down: 9 August 1956
- Launched: 22 June 1957
- Commissioned: 3 October 1958
- Decommissioned: 1 September 1972
- Identification: IMO number: 8450342
- Fate: Scrapped, October 2002

General characteristics
- Class & type: De Soto County-class tank landing ship
- Displacement: 3,560 long tons (3,617 t) light; 7,823 long tons (7,949 t) full load
- Length: 446 ft (136 m)
- Beam: 62 ft (19 m)
- Draft: 17 ft (5.2 m)
- Propulsion: 6 Cooper Bessemer fvam-16 direct reversible diesels,2400 HP ea.
- Speed: 17 knots (31 km/h; 20 mph)
- Capacity: 28 medium tanks or vehicles to 75 tons on 288 ft (88 m) tank deck; 100,000 gal (US) diesel or jet fuel, plus 7,000 gal fuel for embarked vehicles
- Troops: 410 officers and enlisted men
- Complement: 170 officers and enlisted men
- Armament: 3 × twin 3-inch/50-caliber gun mounts

USS Lorain County (LST-1177) was a De Soto County-class tank landing ship built for the United States Navy during the late 1950s. Named after Lorain County, Ohio, she was the only U.S. Naval vessel to bear the name.

Lorain County was designed under project SCB 119 and laid down 9 August 1956 by the American Ship Building Company of Lorain, Ohio; launched 22 June 1957; sponsored by Mrs. Albert D. Baumhart, Jr., wife of Congressman Baumhart of Ohio; and commissioned at New Orleans 3 October 1958.

== Service history ==
This larger, air conditioned, and even more versatile version of the World War II "Landing Ship, Tank" conducted its shakedown out of Little Creek, Virginia and in January 1959 joined PhibRon 6 for the first of many landing exercises on Onslow Beach, North Carolina. On 31 July her squadron steamed from Morehead City, North Carolina with Marines embarked for Mediterranean deployment with the 6th Fleet. Returning to Little Creek 10 February 1961 she concentrated on training with Marines. Each year she served several months with the Caribbean Ready Squadron. Such training proved its value during the 1962 Cuban Missile Crisis, when fully loaded, Lorain County remained on standby in the Caribbean from 22 October to 16 December. Castro's revolutionary pronouncements and his act of shutting off the water supply to Guantanamo Bay Naval Base prevented any true relaxation of tension in the area, and in June 1965 Lorain County carried a Marine heavy artillery company to Guantanamo.

Her Caribbean training in 1966 was highlighted by a visit to Aruba, Netherlands West Indies with PhibRon 4. 1967 saw further Caribbean training and landing exercises, and deployment to the Mediterranean from 30 March to 24 May. After further operations in the Caribbean in early 1968, Lorain County began overhaul at Norfolk, Virginia on 24 June. On 2 December she left the yard and prepared for refresher training into 1969. From the time of commissioning, Lorain County spent her entire period of active service with the Amphibious Force, Atlantic Fleet. In mid 1969 she transited the Panama Canal into the Pacific several weeks before returning through the canal. For 14 years, she engaged in amphibious operations along the east coast of the United States supplemented with extended operations in the Caribbean and regular deployments as a unit of the 6th Fleet in the Mediterranean.

Decommissioned on 1 September 1972 the tank landing ship was assigned to the National Defense Reserve Fleet at Norfolk. Transferred to the Maritime Administration (MARAD) 23 December 1994 for lay-up in the James River Reserve Fleet, Fort Eustis, Virginia, the ship was scrapped in October 2002 at ESCO Marine, Brownsville, Texas.

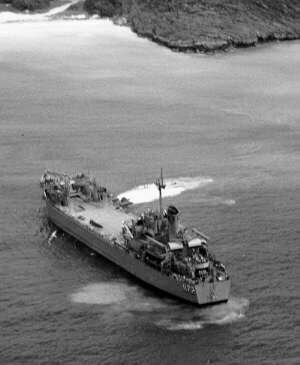
USS Lorain County (LST-1177) gets underway, date and place unknown.
