= HMS Narwhal (S03) =

Submarine of the Royal Navy

- HMS Narwhal (S03)

History

United Kingdom
- Name: HMS Narwhal
- Builder: Vickers-Armstrongs, Barrow-in-Furness
- Laid down: 15 March 1956
- Launched: 25 October 1957
- Decommissioned: 10 February 1977
- Fate: Sunk as a target on 3 August 1985

General characteristics
- Class & type: Porpoise-class submarine
- Displacement: 2,080 tons surfaced; 2,450 tons submerged
- Length: 290 ft (88 m)
- Beam: 26 ft 7 in (8.10 m)
- Draught: 18 ft (5.5 m)
- Propulsion: 2 × Admiralty Standard range diesel generators, 1,650 hp (1,230 kW); 2 × English Electric main motors, 12,000 hp (8,900 kW); 2 shafts
- Speed: 12 knots (22 km/h) surfaced; 17 knots (31 km/h)submerged
- Range: 9,000 nmi (17,000 km) at 12 kn (22 km/h)
- Complement: 71
- Armament: 8 × 21 in (533 mm) torpedo tubes, 6 bow, 2 stern; 30 × Mk 8 or Mk 23 torpedoes, later the Mark 24 Tigerfish

HMS Narwhal (S03) was a Porpoise-class submarine of the Royal Navy. She was launched on 25 October 1957.

== Design and construction ==
The Porpoise class was the first class of operational submarines built for the Royal Navy after the end of the Second World War, and were designed to take advantage of experience gained by studying German Type XXI U-boats and British wartime experiments with the submarine Seraph, which was modified by streamlining and fitting a bigger battery.

The Porpoise-class submarines were 290 feet 3 inches (88.47 m) long overall and 241 feet 0 inches (73.46 m) between perpendiculars, with a beam of 26 feet 6 inches (8.08 m) and a draught of 18 feet 3 inches (5.56 m). Displacement was 1,565 long tons (1,590 t) standard and 1,975 long tons (2,007 t) full load surfaced and 2,303 long tons (2,340 t) submerged.

Propulsion machinery consisted of two Admiralty Standard Range diesel generators rated at a total of 3,680 brake horsepower (2,740 kW), which could charge the submarine's batteries or directly drive the electric motors. These were rated at 6,000 shaft horsepower (4,500 kW), and drove two shafts, giving a speed of 12 knots (14 mph; 22 km/h) on the surface and 16 knots (18 mph; 30 km/h) submerged.

Eight 21-inch (533 mm) torpedo tubes were fitted, six in the bow, and two in the stern. Up to 30 torpedoes could be carried, with the initial outfit consisting of the unguided Mark 8 and the homing Mark 20 torpedoes.

Narwhal was laid down at Vickers-Armstrongs' Barrow-in-Furness shipyard on 15 March 1956, was launched on 25 October 1957 and completed on 4 May 1959.

== Service ==
Narwhal ran aground at the entrance to Campbeltown Loch, Scotland, on 4 April 1960. She was refloated the next day.

In 1960 'Narwhal' was the subject of a Rank organisation film in the Look at Life (Volume 2) series entitled ‘Military Submarine’.

'Narwhal' briefly appears, unnamed, in the 1961 film of The Day Of The Triffids

In 1970 she was present at Portsmouth Navy Days. In October 1976, Narwhal, together with the nuclear attack submarine Sovereign, took part in Operation Brisk, to gain experience in under-ice operations, with Sovereign going on to surface at the North Pole.

Narwhal was decommissioned for the last time on 10 February 1977. On 2 June 1980 Narwhal was sunk off Portland, but was raised in a salvage exercise on 26 June 1980 by the Swedish heavy-lift ship Hebe III. She was scuttled as a target on 3 August 1985 and lies in the English Channel.

== Publications ==
- Blackman, Raymond V. B. (1971). Jane's Fighting Ships 1971–72. London: Sampson Low, Marston & Company. ISBN 0-354-00096-9.
- Brown, David K. (2012). Nelson to Vanguard: Warship Design and Development 1923–1945. Barnsley, UK: Seaforth Publishing. ISBN 978-1-84832-149-6.
- Brown, David K.; Moore, David (2012). Rebuilding the Royal Navy: Warship Design Since 1945. Barnsley, UK: Seaforth Publishing. ISBN 978-1-84832-150-2.
- Colledge, J. J.; Warlow, Ben (2006) [1969]. Ships of the Royal Navy: The Complete Record of All Fighting Ships of the Royal Navy from the 15th Century to the Present (3rd Rev ed.). London: Chatham Publishing. ISBN 978-1-86176-281-8. OCLC 67375475.
- Critchley, Mike (1981). British Warships Since 1945: Part 2. Liskeard, UK: Maritime Books. ISBN 0-9506323-6-8.
- Gardiner, Robert; Chumbley, Stephen, eds. (1995). Conway's All The World's Fighting Ships 1947–1995. Annapolis, Maryland, USA: Naval Institute Press. ISBN 1-55750-132-7.
- Hennessey, Peter; Jinks, James (2016). The Silent Deep: The Royal Navy Submarine Service since 1945. Penguin. ISBN 978-0-241-95948-0.
