= USS York County =

De Soto County-class tank landing ship

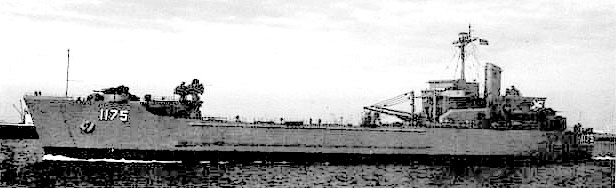
- USS York County (LST-1175). Like earlier LSTs, these ships were often used to transport cargo; a cargo hatch at the after end of the upper deck is served by two heavy booms.

History

United States
- Name: USS York County
- Namesake: York County, Maine; York County, Nebraska; York County, Pennsylvania; York County, South Carolina; York County, Virginia
- Builder: Newport News Shipbuilding & Drydock Company, Newport News, Virginia
- Laid down: 4 June 1956
- Launched: 5 March 1957
- Commissioned: 8 November 1957
- Decommissioned: 17 July 1972
- Stricken: 5 August 1992
- Fate: Transferred to the Italian Navy, 1972

Italy
- Name: Caorle (L 9891)
- Acquired: 1972
- Fate: Sold for scrapping

General characteristics
- Class & type: De Soto County-class tank landing ship
- Displacement: 3,560 long tons (3,617 t) light; 7,823 long tons (7,949 t) full load
- Length: 445 ft (136 m)
- Beam: 62 ft (19 m)
- Draft: 16 ft 8 in (5.08 m)
- Propulsion: 6 × Nordberg diesel engines, two shafts, controllable pitch propellers
- Speed: 17.5 knots (32.4 km/h; 20.1 mph)
- Boats & landing craft carried: 4 LCVPs
- Capacity: 28 medium tanks or vehicles to 75 tons on 288 ft (88 m) tank deck; 100,000 gal (US) diesel or jet fuel, plus 7,000 gal fuel for embarked vehicles
- Troops: 575 officers and enlisted men
- Complement: 10 officers and 162 enlisted men
- Armament: 3 × twin 3-inch/50-caliber gun mounts

USS York County (LST-1175) was a De Soto County-class tank landing ship built for the United States Navy during the late 1950s. The lead ship of her class of seven, she was named after counties in Maine, Nebraska, Pennsylvania, South Carolina, and Virginia, she was the only U.S. Naval vessel to bear the name.

York County was designed under project SCB 119 and laid down on 4 June 1956 at Newport News, Virginia by Newport News Shipbuilding and Drydock Company; launched on 5 March 1957; sponsored by Mrs. William C. France; and commissioned on 8 November 1957.

== Service history ==
=== 1957–1959 ===
The new tank landing ship was fitted out and underwent ready-for-sea trials at Port Everglades, Florida and conducted shakedown training out of her home port, Little Creek, Virginia, which she completed on 17 May 1958. She conducted various operations in the Virginia area until 15 July, when all training was cancelled due to the Lebanon Crisis and York County prepared for extended operations. But the Lebanon Crisis lessened, and the ship proceeded to Vieques, Puerto Rico, for amphibious exercises. On 7 August York County returned to her home port and began preparations for a regularly scheduled deployment to the Mediterranean. She arrived at Gibraltar in late September 1958; then visited Greece, Turkey, Lebanon, and Italy. She returned to Little Creek on 25 March 1959. However, the ship recrossed the Atlantic to hold leading roles in two major amphibious exercises "Tralex 3–59" and "Tralex 4–59" which were conducted off the coast of Spain. In November 1959, York County entered the Norfolk Shipbuilding and Drydock Company for maintenance and upkeep.

=== 1960–1962 ===
She next departed the east coast of the United States on 11 January 1960 for her second Mediterranean deployment. Following her arrival back at her home port on 15 June, York County participated in "Tralex 1–60" and "Lantphibex 500/61" in the area of Vieques, Puerto Rico. In July, she proceeded to Baltimore for an overhaul by the Maryland Shipbuilding and Drydock Company. Upon emerging from the yard, the ship conducted refresher training before deploying to the Caribbean towards the end of November for training operations with other amphibious ships. She returned to Little Creek on 19 January 1961. The next major exercise, "SoLant Amity III," started on 17 April and took York County 27,000 miles in an effort to establish greater understanding between the peoples of the United States and southern Africa. The ship cruised along both the Atlantic and Indian Ocean coasts of Africa and visited 12 ports in 10 countries and received some 23,000 visitors.

After a short midshipman cruise in early November 1961, York County headed for the Caribbean where she participated in Exercise "Phiblex 4–61" before returning to Little Creek in January 1962 for leave and upkeep. On 26 February, she conducted a two-week reserve cruise off the coast of Florida. On 15 May, York County sailed for the Mediterranean where she conducted practice and demonstration landings and participated in the Navy's "People to People" program. York County returned home on 19 October and made a one-day turnaround to take part in the Cuban blockade. It was not until 5 December 1962 that the ship finally returned to the Hampton Roads area for leave and upkeep, followed by a four-month yard and drydock period at Jacksonville, Florida, and six weeks of selected underway training exercises.

=== 1963–1965 ===
In July 1963, York County revisited the Caribbean and transported the highly publicized Puerto Rican National Guard from Ponce, Puerto Rico, to Isla de Vieques. While in the West Indies, she also patrolled off Haiti, ready to evacuate American civilians if the civil disorders in that island required such action. Fortunately, tension eased, and York County returned to Little Creek on 4 October. A visit to Portland, Maine, from 9 to 11 November, preceded a short trip to Roosevelt Roads, Puerto Rico, to transport the men and equipment of Mobile Construction Battalion (MCB) 7. York County returned on 25 November and finished the year undergoing tender availability and upkeep.

For the early part of 1964, York County worked at Vieques, Puerto Rico, and Onslow Beach, N.C. She took part in the Naval Academy's Memorial Day ceremonies at Annapolis, Maryland. During June and July, York County received alterations at the Norfolk Naval Shipyard. On 13 August, the ship lifted the 3rd Marine Light Anti-Aircraft Missile Battalion to Vieques and reembarked the unit on 17 September for the return passage. Ten days later, she returned to Little Creek and commenced preparations for an overseas exercise. On 7 October 1964, York County got underway to join in Operation "Steel Pike I," the largest joint amphibious operation held since World War II. The ship returned home on 28 November 1964 and operated locally into the following spring. On 30 April 1965, York County sailed for the Dominican Republic and transported marines and equipment to Bajos de Haina. She conducted surveillance duties during the crisis in that nation before returning to Norfolk on 7 June and remaining in the Virginia Capes-Hampton Roads area for most of the summer. From September until December 1965, York County was deployed to the Caribbean and participated in numerous amphibious assault exercises and a major fleet exercise, "Phibaswex/Meblex 2–65."

=== 1966–1967 ===
York County was in her home port from 1 January 1966 until 24 January for leave and upkeep. She transported general cargo to Roosevelt Roads, Puerto Rico, then embarked marines and equipment for delivery to Cherry Point, North Carolina, before returning to Little Creek on 9 February. From 18 February through 18 April 1966, York County underwent preparations for overhaul and tender availability. Following this, she traveled to New York City for independent ship exercises, returning home on 26 April. In May, the ship hosted the Swedish ambassador and the Inter-Allied Confederation of Reserve Officers. York County received her overhaul in two parts. The first was accomplished at the Key Highway floating drydock of Bethlehem Steel Corporation, Baltimore, Maryland; the second part was completed 30 September at Horne Bros. Shipyard, Newport News. On 13 October 1966, the ship reloaded ammunition and received refresher training out of Little Creek until 16 November. During the remainder of the month, the ship received new cryptographic equipment and was refueled prior to deployment. York County sailed for the West Indies on 28 November and conducted amphibious exercises and training in the Caribbean for five months. She returned to Little Creek on 6 May 1967 and underwent tender availability. In June, the ship successfully passed a nuclear technical proficiency inspection; acted as a setting for a training film; and transported a Marine Corps engineering company to Vieques Island and back. From 5 to 21 July, York County participated in the anti-submarine Exercise "Plumb Bob III."

During August, York County supported LVT training for Marine Corps reservists and provided control ship duty for drones. She spent September and October in restricted availability and on standby duty, ready to support NASA operations. On 31 October, York County got underway for the middle Atlantic where she served as a recovery ship for the Apollo 4 space shot. On 15 December 1967, the ship underwent tender availability which lasted through the end of the year.

=== 1968–1970 ===
On 17 January 1968, York County got underway from Little Creek; stopped briefly at Morehead City, North Carolina, later that day; and then headed for the Caribbean. While in the West Indies, she visited Vieques, Puerto Rico; Kingston, Jamaica; and St. Croix, Virgin Islands. The ship returned to Little Creek on 15 February, resumed operations in the Virginia capes area, and took part in the Apollo 6 recovery training exercises. On 13 June 1968, York County departed Onslow Beach, N.C., for exercises in waters off Puerto Rico. During the cruise she visited Vieques Island, Puerto Rico; Guantanamo Bay, Cuba; St. Croix, Virgin Islands; and San Juan and Roosevelt Roads, Puerto Rico. York County arrived back at Little Creek on 3 August and conducted various exercises and operations in the Virginia area into autumn.

On 25 October 1968, York County got underway for a deployment to the Caribbean which lasted into February 1969. She returned to Little Creek on the 19th of that month and began a period in port which lasted into May. On 12 May, the ship began another brief Caribbean cruise to take part in Exercise "Exotic Dancer." After stops at Ponce and Roosevelt Roads, Puerto Rico, and St. Croix, Virgin Islands, she participated in a simulated blockade in her part of the exercise. She returned home via San Juan, Roosevelt Roads, and Ponce, Puerto Rico, and reached Little Creek on 9 June. But for a special amphibious exercise at Onslow Beach, N.C., from the 23rd to the 28th, the ship spent the remainder of June and most of July at Little Creek. On 22 July, York County departed Little Creek; crossed the Atlantic; and joined the Mediterranean Ready Amphibious Force. After making several successful landings throughout the Mediterranean and enjoying liberty in many ports, York County returned to Little Creek on 12 December 1969. York County entered Norfolk Shipbuilding and Drydock Company's yard on 20 January 1970 for an overhaul. By 10 August, the ship was ready for sea. she conducted various exercises in the South Carolina operating area. Then, from 2 to 17 September, she prepared for a deployment with the 6th Fleet. The next day, the ship sailed for the Mediterranean, and she transited the Strait of Gibraltar on 29 September. On 9 October, York County conducted Exercise "Deep Express" at Alexandroupolis, Greece. She visited several ports in Greece and Spain before returning to Little Creek on 17 November. The ship finished out the year 1970 at Little Creek undergoing tender availability.

=== 1971–1972 ===
On 18 January 1971, the ship got underway for Vieques Island, Puerto Rico, to participate in the "Firex" exercises. She continued to operate in the Caribbean until 22 February when she arrived at Miami for two days of liberty. the ship returned to Little Creek on 27 February and immediately went alongside USS Amphion (AR-13) for tender availability which lasted until 17 March. After completing fire-fighting training in Philadelphia, York County remained at Little Creek until 25 April except for loading ammunition and gasoline at Craney Island, Virginia. During this time, the crew prepared the ship for Exercise "Exotic Dancer," which commenced on 26 April and lasted through 14 May 1971. Upon her return home, York County operated in the Virginia coastal area and got ready for a month-long cruise in the Caribbean. York County returned to Virginia on 6 August for tender availability followed by type training exercises. On 9 September, the ship was again deployed to the Caribbean and returned to Little Creek on 28 October where she spent the rest of 1971.

She spent January 1972 preparing for an upcoming Caribbean and eastern Pacific cruise. On the last day of the month, York County got underway for the Panama Canal Zone. She left Cristobal on 8 February and, for the first time in her history, transited the Panama Canal and entered the Pacific. Following operations off the coast of Panama, York County reentered the Atlantic; proceeded to Guantanamo Bay, Cuba; spent two days there; then moved to the Bahamas to onload dredging equipment at Andros Island before returning to Little Creek on 20 March 1972. She remained at Little Creek until 12 April when she sailed for Wilmington, North Carolina, for the annual Azalea Festival. From 18 April to 8 May 1972, the ship remained in port at Little Creek; and on 9 May, she got underway for Exercise "Exotic Dancer V." She returned to her home port on 24 May.

=== Decommissioning and transfer ===
York County was decommissioned on 17 July 1972 and transferred to the Italian government. She served the Italian Navy as Caorle (L 8991) until finally being sold for scrap at Naples, Italy, date unknown. The ship was struck from the Naval Vessel Register 5 August 1992.

== See also ==
- List of United States Navy LSTs
