= USS Graham County =

Tank landing ship of the US Navy

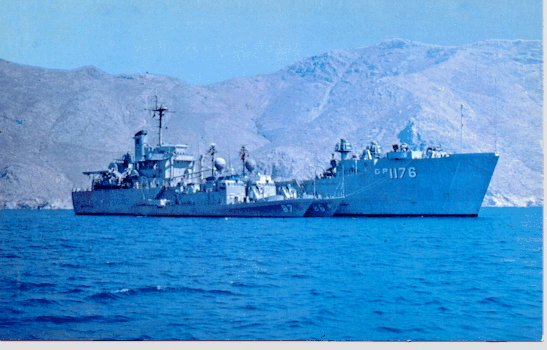
- USS Graham County (AGP-1176) with Antelope (PG-86) and Ready (PG-87) alongside, date and location unknown.

History

United States
- Name: USS Graham County
- Namesake: Graham County
- Builder: Newport News Shipbuilding & Drydock Company, Newport News, Virginia
- Laid down: 4 February 1957
- Launched: 9 September 1957
- Commissioned: 17 April 1958
- Decommissioned: 1 March 1977
- Reclassified: AGP-1176 (Patrol Craft Tender), 1972
- Stricken: 1 March 1977
- Fate: Sold for scrap, 1 March 1978

General characteristics
- Class & type: De Soto County-class tank landing ship
- Displacement: 3,560 long tons (3,617 t) light; 7,823 long tons (7,949 t) full load
- Length: 446 ft (136 m)
- Beam: 62 ft (19 m)
- Draft: 17 ft (5.2 m)
- Propulsion: 6 × Nordberg diesel engines; 2 shafts; Controllable pitch propellers
- Speed: 17 knots (31 km/h; 20 mph)
- Boats & landing craft carried: 4 LCVPs
- Capacity: 28 medium tanks or vehicles to 75 tons on 288 ft (88 m) tank deck; 100,000 gal (US) diesel or jet fuel, plus 7,000 gal fuel for embarked vehicles
- Troops: 410 officers and enlisted men
- Complement: 170 officers and enlisted men
- Armament: 3 × twin 3"/50 caliber gun mounts

USS Graham County (LST-1176/AGP-1176) was a De Soto County-class tank landing ship built for the United States Navy during the late 1950s. Named after counties in Arizona, Kansas, and North Carolina, she was the only U.S. Naval vessel to bear the name.

Graham County was designed under project SCB 119 and laid down by Newport News Shipbuilding & Drydock Company of Newport News, Virginia 4 February 1957; launched 9 September; sponsored by Mrs. Ralph Otis Davis; and commissioned 17 April 1958.

== Service history ==
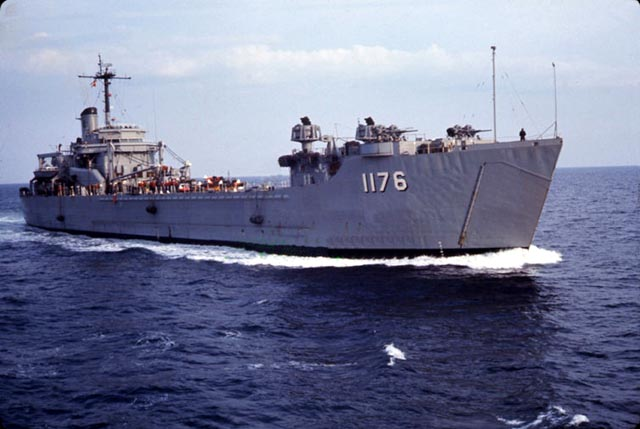
Underway 1964

After shakedown Graham County continued tests and repairs throughout 1958. Assigned to the Atlantic amphibious force, the LST engaged in training exercises along the Atlantic coast until late November, 1960 when she embarked a detachment of marines and sailed for her first extended deployment. Touching ports in the Caribbean and Brazil, she sailed on to Africa, arriving Monrovia, Liberia 5 January 1961. She stopped at other ports in Africa including the Congo, where she embarked 500 Guinean troops of the U.N. peacekeeping force for transport to their country. Graham County returned to Little Creek, Virginia 17 May. Following the assassination of Dominican Republic President Rafael Trujillo on 30 May 1961 the LST, together with units of the fleet, steamed toward the Caribbean ready to assist if needed. Returning in early July, she resumed training operations for the next two years.

On 10 January 1964, Graham County with 170 marines on board departed Little Creek for amphibious exercises in the Mediterranean. Training was postponed, however, when the Cyprus crisis erupted; and Graham County, along with other units of Amphibious Squadron 4, rushed to the scene prepared for any mission. After 78 consecutive days in the area, she resumed her training exercises with the fleet. Returning home 21 June, Graham County resumed amphibious operations in the Atlantic and Caribbean for the rest of the year. Assigned to the Amphibious Force, Atlantic Fleet, Graham County conducted operations off the east coast of the United States and in the Caribbean and Mediterranean for the next 14 years. Redesignated USS Graham County (AGP-1176) in 1972, her primary mission became the support of patrol gunboats, and her home port was changed to Naples, Italy.

Decommissioned on 1 March 1977 and struck from the Naval Vessel Register that same day, Graham County was sold by MARAD 1 March 1978 and subsequently scrapped.

== See also ==
- Graham County, Arizona
- Graham County, Kansas
- Graham County, North Carolina
