= De Soto County-class tank landing ship =

Class of United States Navy tank landing ships

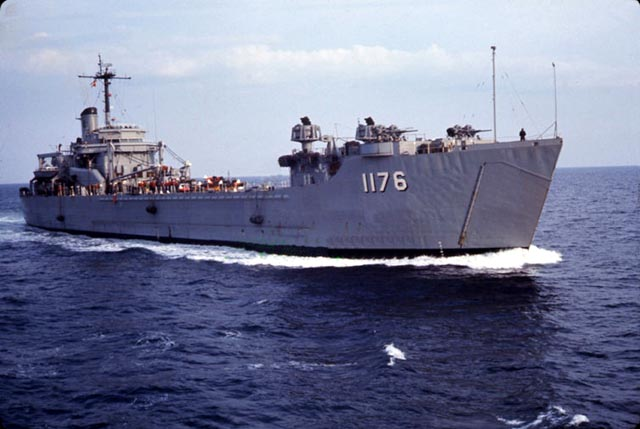
- USS Graham County

Class overview
- Name: De Soto County class
- Builders: Avondale Shipyard; Newport News Shipbuilding; American Ship Building Company; Boston Naval Shipyard
- Operators: United States Navy; Italian Navy; Brazilian Navy
- Preceded by: Terrebonne Parish class
- Succeeded by: Newport class
- Built: 1956-1959
- In commission: 1958-1973
- Planned: 8
- Completed: 7
- Canceled: 1
- Retired: 7

General characteristics
- Type: Tank landing ship
- Displacement: 3,560 long tons (3,617 t) light; 7,823 long tons (7,949 t) full load
- Length: 445 ft (136 m)
- Beam: 62 ft (19 m)
- Draft: 16 ft 8 in (5.08 m)
- Propulsion: 6 × Fairbanks-Morse diesel engines; 2 × shafts; Fixed pitch propellers
- Speed: 17.5 knots (32.4 km/h; 20.1 mph)
- Boats & landing craft carried: 3 × LCVPs; 1 × Captain's Gig
- Capacity: 28 medium tanks or vehicles to 75 tons on 288 ft (88 m) tank deck; 100,000 gal (US) diesel or jet fuel, plus 7,000 gal fuel for embarked vehicles
- Troops: 575 officers and enlisted men
- Complement: 10 officers and 162 enlisted men
- Armament: 3 × 3 in (76 mm)/50 cal Mark 22 guns
- Aviation facilities: Helipad

The De Soto County-class tank landing ship was a class of tank landing ship of United States Navy and later sold to the Italian and Brazilian Navy.

== Development ==
In the 1950s, eight ships were authorized to begin construction but one was later cancelled as the ship's contract was not awarded. The remaining seven ships were put into service between 1957 and 1959. The ships were designed to give a comfortable experience for the crew thus the ships were air conditioned. They have the capability of carrying vehicles or equipments up to 75 tons and 87.7 meters.

Five ships were decommissioned in 1972, with LST-1171 and LST-1175 being sold to Italy. Brazil too acquired LST-1174 and commissioned her into service. LST-1176 was converted into a patrol gunboat support ship and reclassified as AGP-1176. LST-1178 was to be converted into a support ship for the Pegasus-class hydrofoils but plans later fell through.

== Ships of class ==
Pennant number	Name	Callsign	Builders	Launched	Commissioned	Decommissioned	Fate
De Soto County-class tank landing ship
LST-1171	De Soto County	NIOD	Avondale Shipyard	28 February 1957	10 June 1958	17 July 1972	Sold to Italy and renamed Nave Grado (L9890), later scrapped in 1989
LST-1172	Cancelled						
LST-1173	Suffolk County	NVWD	Boston Naval Shipyard	5 September 1956	15 August 1957	25 August 1972	Scrapped in 1999
LST-1174	Grant County	NIOF	Avondale Shipyard	12 October 1956	17 December 1957	15 January 1973	Sold to Brazil and renamed Duque de Caxias (G 26), fate unknown
LST-1175	York County	NVWF	Newport News Shipbuilding	5 March 1957	8 November 1957	17 July 1972	Sold to Italy and renamed Nave Caorle (L9891), later scrapped
LST-1176 / AGP-1176	Graham County	NIOH	Newport News Shipbuilding	9 September 1957	17 April 1958	1 March 1977	Fate unknown
LST-1177	Lorain County	NVWO	American Shipbuilding	22 June 1957	3 October 1958	1 September 1972	Scrapped in October 2002
LST-1178	Wood County	NIOJ	American Shipbuilding	14 December 1957	5 August 1959	1 May 1972	Scrapped in July 2002

== See also ==
Equivalent landing ships of the same era

- Round Table class
