= British Porpoise-class submarine =

Class of submarines in the Royal Navy

- HMS Rorqual

Class overview
- Name: Porpoise
- Builders: Vickers Shipbuilding and Engineering; Cammell Laird; Scotts Shipbuilding and Engineering Company
- Operators: Royal Navy
- Preceded by: Explorer class
- Succeeded by: Oberon class
- Built: 1956–1959
- In service: 1961-1980s
- In commission: 1956–1988
- Completed: 8

General characteristics
- Type: Patrol/Attack submarine
- Displacement: 2,080 tons surfaced; 2,450 tons submerged
- Length: 290 ft (88 m)
- Beam: 26 ft 7 in (8.10 m)
- Draught: 18 ft (5.5 m)
- Propulsion: 2 × Admiralty Standard range diesel generators, 1,650 hp (1,230 kW); 2 × English Electric main motors, 6,000 hp (4,500 kW); 2 shafts
- Speed: 12 kn (22 km/h; 14 mph) surfaced; 17 kn (31 km/h; 20 mph) submerged
- Range: 9,000 nmi (17,000 km; 10,000 mi) at 12 kn (22 km/h; 14 mph)
- Complement: 71
- Armament: 8 × 21 inch (533 mm) torpedo tubes, 6 bow, 2 stern; 30 × Mark 8 or Mark 23 torpedoes, later the Mark 24 Tigerfish

The Porpoise class was an eight-boat class of diesel-electric submarines operated by the Royal Navy. This class was originally designated patrol submarines, then attack. They were the first conventional British submarines to be built after the end of World War II. Their design was, in many ways, influenced by the German World War II-era Type XXI U-boats.

== Design ==
The Porpoise-class submarines were larger but shorter than their T-class predecessors and used a much improved steel known as UXW. This, and improved design and construction techniques allowed much deeper diving. It was found in tests that the unusually long engine room was liable to collapse, so there were extra large frames in this section, which proved to be something of an operational inconvenience.

Designed with a top speed of 18 knots (33 km/h; 21 mph), the boats were capable of 17 knots (31 km/h; 20 mph), or 16 knots (30 km/h; 18 mph) once fitted with silenced propellers. However, quieter running was felt to be a positive trade-off for the reduced speed. The Porpoise class were exceptionally quiet underwater, more so than their NATO counterparts and far more so than the Soviet Whiskeys. This was in part due to careful attention to detail in the mounting of machinery, and advances made in propeller design to prevent cavitation. Initially, the silenced propellers actually set up a distinctive resonant "singing". However, grooves were cut into the propellers and injected with a damping filler which cured the problem; Rorqual was later able to surface undetected off the Statue of Liberty. The silent running abilities made their sonar equipment particularly effective.

Each submarine's armament consisted of eight 21 inch (533 mm) torpedo tubes; six in the bow, and two in the stern. Initially, up to 30 Mark 8 or Mark 23 torpedoes were carried, although these were replaced in the 1970s by the Mark 24 Tigerfish torpedo. The class were also the first since the World War I-era R class to not carry a deck gun.

The Porpoises were far more capable than previous submarine classes in operating for prolonged periods, thanks to much improved air recirculation and cleaning systems. The class also performed excellently in clandestine operations, such as surveillance and inserting special forces.

The first Porpoise-class boats were launched in 1958 during the ever-increasing threat of the Soviet Union's submarine fleet. The Porpoise-class boats were all decommissioned by the 1980s. The Oberon-class submarines, which were almost identical to the Porpoises, and the first of which was commissioned in 1961, survived their predecessor only a little longer, all being decommissioned in the early 1990s.

== Boats in the class ==
| Name | Launched | Fate |
|---|---|---|
| Porpoise | 25 April 1956, built by Vickers at Barrow-in-Furness | Sunk as a target in 1985. |
| Rorqual | 5 December 1956, built by Vickers at Barrow-in-Furness | Broken up 1977 |
| Narwhal | 25 October 1957. Built by Vickers at Barrow-in-Furness | Sunk as a target on 3 August 1983 |
| Grampus | 30 May 1957. Built by Cammell Laird at Birkenhead. | Sunk as a target in 1980 |
| Finwhale | 21 July 1959. Built by Cammell Laird at Birkenhead. | Broken up in 1988 |
| Cachalot | 11 December 1957 Built by Scotts at Greenock | Broken up in 1980 |
| Sealion | 31 December 1959. Built by Cammell Laird at Birkenhead. | Sold in 1987; scrapped 1990 |
| Walrus | 22 September 1959 Built by Scotts at Greenock | Sold in 1987; scrapped 1991 |

== See also ==
- List of submarines of the Royal Navy

Equivalent submarines of the same era

- Zulu class
- Dolfijn class
- Tang class
- Narval class
