= Tigerfish (torpedo) =

Royal Navy torpedo deployed in 1979

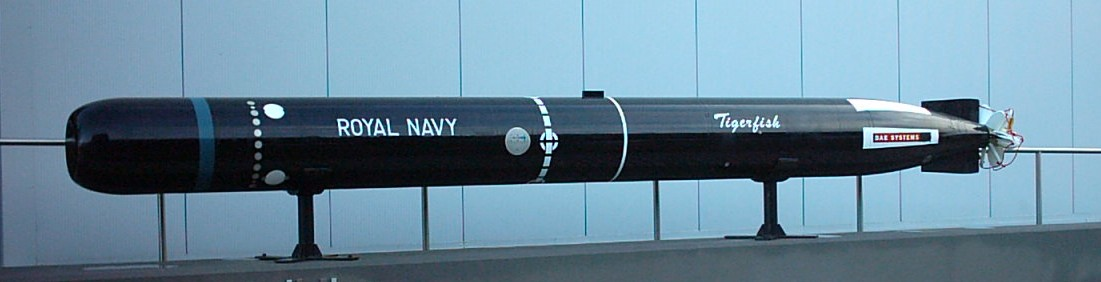
- Type: Mark 24-Mod-0: Heavyweight ASW torpedo; Mark 24-Mod-1 and 2: Heavyweight dual-purpose ASW and ASuW torpedo
- Place of origin: United Kingdom

Service history
- In service: 1979–present (withdrawn from Royal Navy 2004)
- Used by: Royal Navy; Brazilian Navy; Turkish Naval Forces; Chilean Navy; Venezuelan Navy

Production history
- Manufacturer: Marconi Underwater Systems Ltd (Mod 2 Variant)

Specifications
- Mass: 1,550 kg (3,417 lb)
- Length: 6.5 m (21 ft)
- Diameter: 533 mm (21 in)
- Maximum firing range: 39 km (43,000 yd) at low speed 13 km (14,000 yd) at high speed
- Warhead: Torpex
- Warhead weight: 134 to 340 kg (295 to 750 lb)
- Engine: Electrical chloride silver-zinc oxide batteries
- Maximum speed: 35-knot (65 km/h; 40 mph)
- Guidance system: Wire-guided to point of passive sonar target acquisition and passive terminal homing sonar. Option of using active acquisition and homing.
- Launch platform: submarine

The Mark 24 Tigerfish was a heavyweight acoustic homing torpedo used by the Royal Navy (RN) during the 1980s and 90s. Conceptual development dates to the mid-1950s, and formally started in 1959 with a target introduction date in 1969. A lengthy development process led to a greatly reduced performance requirement, including the removal of anti-surface capabilities. The first prototype "Tiger Fish" examples were delivered in 1967.

The Tigerfish was fitted with both active and passive sonar and could be remotely controlled through a thin wire which connected it to the launching submarine. Wire guidance permits a torpedo to be launched on-first-warning, i.e. when a target is first detected at long range. This gives the torpedo the time needed to close the range while target course and speed are being updated by the submarine's superior sensors and transmitted 'down-the-wire'. The torpedo can also be reassigned to another target or recalled. Typically, wire-guided torpedoes initially run at low speed in order to maximize their range and to minimize their self-generated noise while they close the range, and speed up during the attack phase.

Testing in 1969 revealed many problems, especially with the seeker system. An upgrade program was ordered, producing the Mod 1 which regained the surface-attack mode. Testing from 1975 led to a production order in 1977, but it was not until 1983 that these officially entered service. Service during the 1982 Falklands War revealed serious reliability problems. A more significant upgrade program followed, the Consolidation Programme, which addressed the complete weapon system including the fire control system. This emerged as the much more reliable Mod 2, which entered service in 1987. A final upgrade series, Mod 2*, entered service in 1992. A simplified inexpensive version, Mod 3, was not produced.

While Tigerfish was being deployed, a new project was started that more closely followed the original performance requirement, and ultimately greatly surpassed it. This resulted in the much more capable Spearfish torpedo, which began replacing Tigerfish starting in 1988. The last examples of the Tigerfish retired from RN service in 2004. Tigerfish was also operated by Turkey, Chile, Brazil, Colombia and Indonesia. A total of 2,184 Mk.24s were produced.

== Design and development ==
The initial concept developed in the mid-1950s was for a fast, 55-knot (102 km/h; 63 mph), deep-diving torpedo driven by an internal combustion engine, carrying high pressure oxygen as oxidant, guided by a wire system developed from the Mackle wire-guidance study dated 1952 using data transmitted from the firing submarine sonars and using an autonomous active/passive sonar developed from the abandoned 1950s UK PENTANE torpedo project.

The weapon was known as Project ONGAR because Ongar railway station was, until 1994, the last on the Central line of the London Underground system. The engineers developing this weapon were confident that it would be so advanced that it would be "...the end of the line for torpedo development".

The programme ran into serious problems in the late 1950s because the technology required was too advanced to meet an in-service target date of 1969. In addition, the closure of the Torpedo Experimental Establishment, Greenock, Scotland in 1959 and the transfer of its staff to Portland in Dorset disrupted the pace of development.

In the early 1960s a series of wide-ranging reviews (one report was titled "Whither ONGAR?" - the pun being intentional) led to a greatly reduced performance specification which was realistically expected to achieve an in-service date of 1969.

The propulsion system was changed from an internal combustion engine to an electric motor with a silver zinc battery as the power source. This reduced the planned speed of the weapon from 55 to 24 knots (102 to 44 km/h; 63 to 28 mph) with a short final-attack-phase capability at 35 knots (65 km/h; 40 mph).

The homing system was simplified by the exclusion of the anti-surface ship capability in the Mod 0 weapon.

Only the wire-guidance system was retained relatively unchanged. This was similar to the system used on the earlier Mk 23 torpedo.

The original requirement for a crush depth of 1,000 ft (300 m) was overtaken by rapid advances in SSN deep-diving performance and the requirement was progressively increased to 1,600 ft (490 m) and then 2,000 ft (610 m).

== In-service performance ==
Early models suffered from poor reliability: only 40% of the Mod 0 ASW model performed as designed. The torpedo depended in large part on the remote-control system, but the weapon tended to dip during launch, severing the control wire. A redesigned version, designated the Tigerfish Mod 1, aimed to rectify some of the original model's faults but failed its initial fleet acceptance trials in 1979 despite some improvements. Lacking any alternative it was nevertheless issued to the fleet (alongside the Mod 0 which also failed its own fresh acceptance trials the same year) in 1980. When HMS Conqueror sank the ARA General Belgrano during the 1982 Falklands War she used the "point and shoot" 21-inch Mark VIII torpedoes rather than her Tigerfish. The Mark VIII had no homing system but, despite the design being over 50 years old at the time, was far more reliable and carried a greater high-explosive payload. In a test carried out by submarines returning to the UK after the war, two of five Mod 1 Tigerfish fired at a target hulk failed to function at all and the remaining three failed to hit the target.

The Royal Navy's need for a reliable means of dealing with fast, deep-diving, time-urgent targets at long range resulted in a project to arm Tigerfish with a nuclear warhead to offset its poor diving depth and homing performance and to push kill probability close to 90%. Various other measures were proposed in mid-1969, including purchase of U.S. weapons such as the Mark 45 ASTOR nuclear torpedo, the Mark 48 Mod-1 torpedo or the Subroc rocket. Alternatively, at the initiative of Flag Officer Submarines (FOSM), a nuclear warhead might be fitted to the unguided, shallow-running and short-ranged, but reliable Mark VIII torpedo. Flag Officer Submarines minuted that the proposal to arm the Mark VIII with the WE.177A warhead would, despite the torpedo's performance shortcomings, result in a torpedo "much superior to any present British submarine weapon ..." However, the short range of the Mark VIII put the firing submarine within damage range of the nuclear warhead of its torpedo.

The Marconi Consolidation Programme of the early 1980s finally produced the Mod 2 with reliability improved to 80%, which the Royal Navy accepted as the best that could be achieved with a basic design that was incapable of further development. By 1987, 600 Tigerfish had been modified to the Mod 2 standard.

Further improvements, including improved under-ice and anti-surface performance led to a Mod 2* (enhanced) version being accepted into the fleet in 1992. The new version featured substantial changes to batteries, sensors and warhead. Further software enhancements continued throughout its operational life.

The tribulations in the Tigerfish's development, from its conception in the mid-1950s to the introduction of the unsuccessful Mod 0 variant into Royal Navy service in 1980, prompted the decision to purchase cruise missiles to attack ships from Royal Navy submarines.

Versions were:

Mark 24-Mod-0 for ASW use. Dive depth 1,150 ft (351 m).
Mark 24-Mod-1 (or Mark 24 DP) for ASW and ASV use. Dive depth 1,450 ft (442 m).
Mark 24-Mod-1-N for ASW and ASV use. Dive depth 1,450 ft (442 m). The nuclear version – paper study only.
Mark 24-Mod-2 for ASW and ASV use. Dive depth 1,450 ft (442 m). The Marconi upgrade.

In 1990 Cardoen of Chile was granted a licence to manufacture Tigerfish for the Chilean, Brazilian and Venezuelan navies.

The Royal Navy retired the last of its Tigerfish torpedoes from active service in February 2004.

A proposal to develop a Mod 3 configuration which might be attractive to existing export customers in Brazil and Turkey never came to fruition.

== See also ==
- Mk 48
- Varunastra (torpedo)
- Black Shark
- Spearfish
- Baek Sang Eo (White Shark)
- Type 89
- Type 65
- Yu-6
