= BNS Prottoy =

Corvette of the Bangladesh Navy

History

Bangladesh
- Name: BNS Prottoy
- Ordered: October 2012
- Builder: Wuchang Shipyard
- Laid down: 8 January 2013
- Launched: 30 December 2014
- Acquired: 11 December 2015
- Commissioned: 19 March 2016
- Home port: Chittagong
- Identification: Pennant number: F112
- Status: In active service

General characteristics
- Class & type: Type 056 corvette
- Displacement: 1330 tonnes
- Length: 90.1 metres (296 ft)
- Beam: 11.14 metres (36.5 ft)
- Draft: 3.37 metres (11.1 ft)
- Propulsion: 2 x SEMT Pielstick 12PA6 diesel
- Speed: 25 knots (46 km/h; 29 mph)
- Complement: 78 (18 officer)
- Sensors & processing systems: Type 360 air/surface search radar, E/F band; Type 348 fire control radar for main gun; Kelvin Hughes SharpEye I-Band (X-Band) radar; Kelvin Hughes SharpEye E/F-Band (S-Band) radar
- Armament: 1 x H/PJ-26 76 mm main gun; 2 x H/PJ-17 30 mm gun turret; 2 x 2 cell C-802A anti-ship missiles; 1 x 8 cell FL-3000N; 2 × 6-tube Type-87 ASW rocket launchers
- Aviation facilities: Helicopter deck

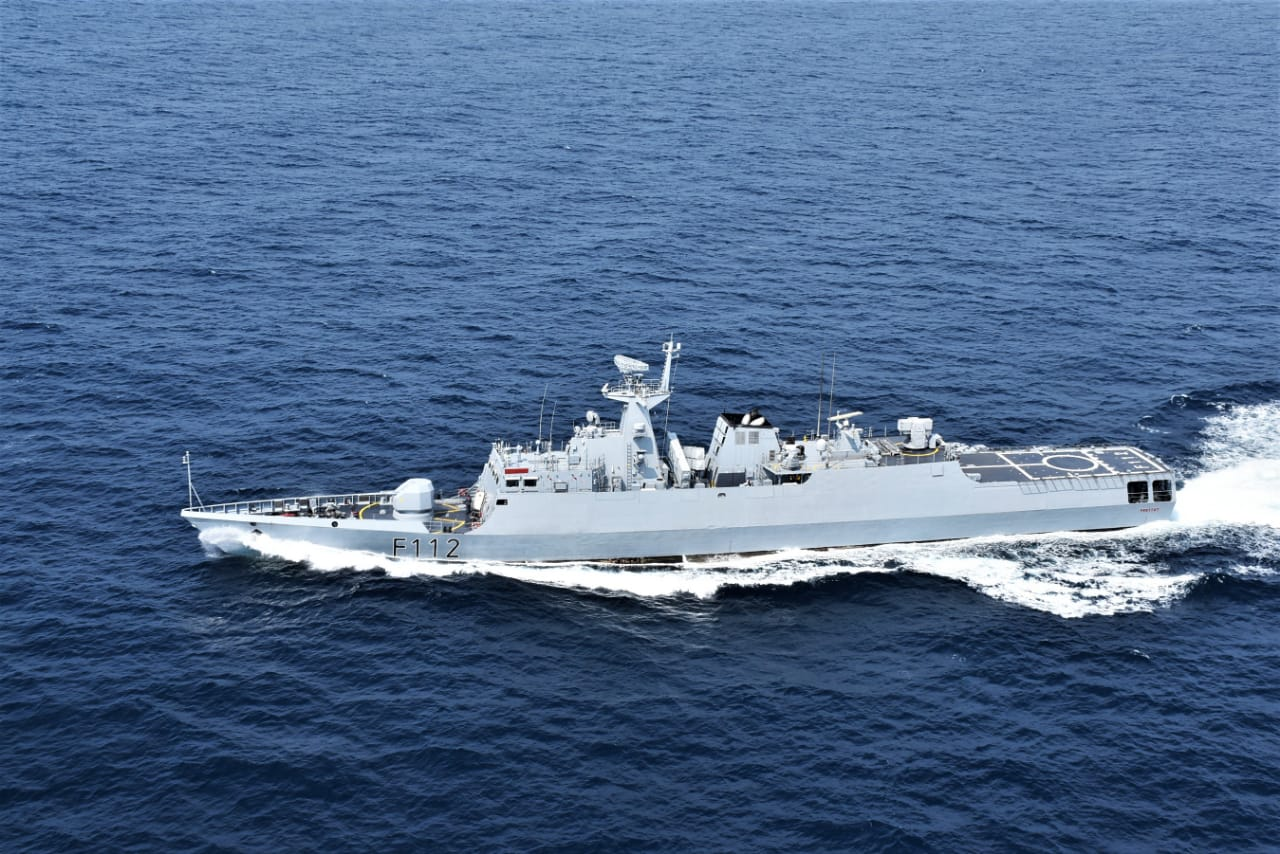
BNS Prottoy, during Bongosagar exercise with Indian Navy

BNS Prottoy is a Type 056 stealth surface warfare guided missile corvette of Bangladesh Navy. She was built at Wuchang Shipyard of China. She is the second corvette of the class for the Bangladesh Navy. The ship has been serving the Bangladesh Navy since 2016.

== Service history ==
BNS Prottoy was launched at Wuchang Shipyard, China on 30 December 2014. The ship was handed over to the Bangladesh Navy on 11 December 2015. She reached Chittagong, Bangladesh on 10 January 2016. On 19 March 2016, she was commissioned to Bangladesh Navy.

Due to inclement weather in the Bay of Bengal, six fishing trawlers of Bangladesh with 90 fishermen entered into Indian waters with their boats damaged. On 21 August 2016, BNS Prottoy and her sister ship BNS Shadhinota were sent to rescue them.

The ship participated in the Langkawi International Maritime and Aerospace Exhibition LIMA-2017 held between 22 and 25 March 2017. She left for Malaysia from Chittagong on 13 March 2017. On her way to Malaysia, she visited the port of Yangon in Myanmar from 15 to 18 March 2017. She visited the port of Phuket from 26 to 29 March 2017 on her way back home. She came back home on 1 April 2017.

BNS Prottoy took part in international fleet review arranged to celebrate 70th anniversary of People's Liberation Army Navy from 22 to 25 April 2019. She left Bangladesh for China on 29 March 2019. On the way to China, she visited the Lumut Port of Malaysia from 2 to 5 April 2019 and Saigon Port of Vietnam from 8 to 11 April 2019.

BNS Prottoy participated in Exercise Bongosagar-2020 and Coordinated Patrol (CORPAT)-2020, bilateral exercises with the Indian Navy held on 4 and 5 October 2020 in the northern Bay of Bengal region.

BNS Prottoy left Chattogram on 6 February 2021 to take part in IDEX-2021 and Navy Defence Exhibition (NAVDEX)-2021, to be held in United Arab Emirates. En route to and from Abu Dhabi, she paid goodwill visits to the port of Mumbai in India.

== Design ==
The ship is 90.1 metres (296 ft) long, has a beam of 11.14 metres (36.5 ft) and a draught of 3.37 metres (11.1 ft). With a displacement of 1,300 tonnes, she has a complement of 78 personnel including 60 sailors and 18 officers. She is propelled by two SEMT Pielstick 12PA6 diesel engines with a distance adjustable tail rotor which can provide enough power for her top speed of more than 25 knots (46 km/h; 29 mph). She has two power stations, former and rear and electricity supply works with one of the power station sunk. Compared to the traditional round bilge boat, the ship is designed with V type, having angle bending line at the bottom so that she can sail with high speed in rough sea states. However, the ship does not carry any type of sonars so she has limited anti-submarine warfare capabilities. As a result, she will act mainly as a surface warfare corvette. BNS Prottoy has a helicopter deck at her back which can support a medium size helicopter but she has no hangar.

=== Electronics ===
The ship uses SharpEye I-Band (X-band) and E/F-Band (S-band) radars from Kelvin Hughes with MantaDigital tactical display software. These radars are used for surface search and navigation purposes. They can be used for Helicopter control and recovery also. A low peak transmission power of these radars reduces the probability of intercept by ESM systems.

=== Armaments ===
The ship carries one H/PJ-26 76 mm main gun placed forward. Two 2-cell C-802A Anti-ship missiles are installed in the ship for anti surface operations. Two H/PJ-17 30 mm remote controlled gun turrets at amidship. For air defence, she carries an eight-cell FL-3000N launcher, which is the Chinese equivalent of RAM. The ship also carries two 6-cell Type-87 240mm ASW rocket launchers.

== See also ==
- List of active ships of the Bangladesh Navy
- Type 056 corvette
