= BNS Shadhinota =

History

Bangladesh
- Name: BNS Shadhinota
- Ordered: October 2012
- Builder: Wuchang Shipyard
- Laid down: 8 January 2013
- Launched: 30 November 2014
- Acquired: 11 December 2015
- Commissioned: 19 March 2016
- Home port: Chittagong
- Identification: Pennant number: F111
- Status: In active service

General characteristics
- Class & type: Type 056 corvette
- Displacement: 1330 tonnes
- Length: 90.1 metres (296 ft)
- Beam: 11.14 metres (36.5 ft)
- Draft: 3.37 metres (11.1 ft)
- Propulsion: 2 x SEMT Pielstick 12PA6 diesel
- Speed: 25 knots (46 km/h; 29 mph)
- Complement: 78 (18 officer)
- Sensors & processing systems: Type 360 air/surface search radar, E/F band; Type 348 fire control radar for main gun; Kelvin Hughes SharpEye I-band (X-band) radar; Kelvin Hughes SharpEye E/F-band (S-band) radar
- Armament: 1 x H/PJ-26 76 mm main gun; 2 x H/PJ-17 30 mm gun turret; 2 x 2 cell C-802A anti-ship missiles; 1 x 8 cell FL-3000N; 2 × 6-tube Type-87 ASW rocket launchers
- Aviation facilities: Helicopter deck

BNS Shadhinota is a Type 056 stealth surface warfare guided missile corvette of the Bangladesh Navy.It was built at Wuchang Shipyard of China. It is the first corvette of the class for the Bangladesh Navy. The ship is serving the Bangladesh Navy since 2016.

== Career ==
BNS Shadhinota was launched at Wuchang Shipyard on 30 November 2014. The ship was handed over to the Bangladesh Navy on 11 December 2015. She reached Chittagong, Bangladesh on 10 January 2016. On 19 March 2016, she was commissioned to Bangladesh Navy.

Due to inclement weather in the Bay of Bengal, six fishing trawlers of Bangladesh with 90 fishermen entered into Indian waters with their boats damaged. On 21 August 2016, BNS Shadhinota with her sister ship BNS Prottoy were sent to rescue them.

The ship participated in the International Maritime Defence Exhibition (IMDEX) 2017 at Singapore. She left Chittagong on 2 May 2017 to participate the event. On her way, she visited the port of Lumut, Malaysia. She also participated in 6th Western Pacific Naval Symposium (WPNS) Multilateral Sea Exercise and Maritime Information Sharing Exercise (MARISX) 2017. On her way back, she visited the Phuket port of Thailand.

Shadhinota participated in International Maritime Defence Exhibition (IMDEX) Asia 2019, held at Singapore. She left Chattogram for Singapore on 5 May 2019. On her way, she will make goodwill visits to the Port Klang of Malaysia and Phuket Port of Thailand. She is scheduled to return on 25 May 2019.

BNS Shadhinota took part in Coordinated Patrol (CORPAT-2019) exercise with the India Navy along the Bangladesh-India maritime border from 10 to 12 October 2019. The ship reached Visakhapatnam Port of India as a part of exercise on 12 October 2019. She came back home on 18 October 2019.

The ship left for Qatar on 28 February 2020 to take part in 7th Doha International Maritime Exhibition and Conference (DIMDEX-2020), was supposed to be held from 16 to 18 March 2020. But later on, due to COVID-19 pandemic, the exhibition was cancelled.

== Design ==
The ship is 90.1 metres (296 ft) long, has a beam of 11.14 metres (36.5 ft) and a draught of 3.37 metres (11.1 ft). With a displacement of 1,300 tonnes, she has a complement of 78 personnel including 60 sailors and 18 officers. She is propelled by two SEMT Pielstick 12PA6 diesel engines with a distance adjustable tail rotor which can provide enough power for her top speed of more than 25 knots (46 km/h; 29 mph). She has two power stations, forward and rear, and electricity supply works with one of the power station sunk. Compared to the traditional round bilge boat, the ship is designed with V type, having angle bending line at the bottom so that she can sail with high speed in rough sea states. However, the ship does not carry any type of sonar so she has limited anti-submarine warfare capability. As a result, she will act mainly as a surface warfare corvette. BNS Shadhinota has a helicopter deck aft which can support a medium-size helicopter, but she has no hangar.

=== Electronics ===
The ship uses SharpEye I-Band (X-band) and E/F-band (S-band) radars from Kelvin Hughes with MantaDigital tactical display software. These radars are used for surface search and navigation purposes and can be used for helicopter control and recovery also. A low peak transmission power of these radars reduces the probability of intercept by ESM systems.

=== Armaments ===
The ship carries one H/PJ-26 76 mm main gun placed forward. Two 2-cell C-802A Anti-ship missiles are installed in the ship for anti surface operations. Two H/PJ-17 30 mm remote controlled gun turrets at amidship. For air defence, she carries an eight-cell FL-3000N launcher, which is the Chinese equivalent of RAM. The ship also carries two 6-cell Type-87 240mm ASW rocket launchers.

== See also ==
- List of active ships of the Bangladesh Navy
- Type 056 corvette
