= List of corvette classes in service =

The list of corvette classes in service includes all those currently with navies or armed forces and auxiliaries in the world. Ships are grouped by type, and listed alphabetically within.

== Type 056 corvette (NATO codename Jiangdao) ==
- Builders: China (Hudong Shipyard in Shanghai and Huangpu Shipyard in Guangzhou), Algeria
- Type: Stealth missile corvette
- Displacement: 1,300–1,440 tons (estimated)
- Aircraft: 1 Harbin Z-9
- Armament: 2 × 2 YJ-83 (C-803) anti-ship missile; 1 × FL-3000N SAM; 1 × ATK-176 76 mm main gun; 2 × 30 mm remote weapon system; 6 × torpedo tubes
- Powerplant: 2 diesels
- Speed: 28 knots
- Ships in class: 60 (PLAN)
- Operator: People's Liberation Army Navy, Bangladesh Navy, Nigerian Navy, Royal Cambodian Navy, Algerian National Navy
- Commissioned: February 2013
- Status: 42 in active service; 18 under sea trial, fitting out, under construction or planned (PLAN)

== Abhay-class corvette ==
- Builders: India Garden Reach Shipbuilders and Engineers
- Type: Corvette
- Displacement: Full load: 485 tonnes
- Length: 58.5 metres
- Beam: 10.2 metres
- Draught: 3.3 metres
- Speed: 32 knots
- Range: 2,400 miles at 14 knots
- Complement: 32 including 6 officers
- Armament:
  - 1 × AK-176 76 mm gun
  - 2 × RBU-1000
  - 4 × Strela-2M SAM MANPADS
  - 4 × 533 mm torpedo tubes
- Ships in class: 4
- Commissioned: 1989–1991
- Status: In active service

== Ada-class corvette ==
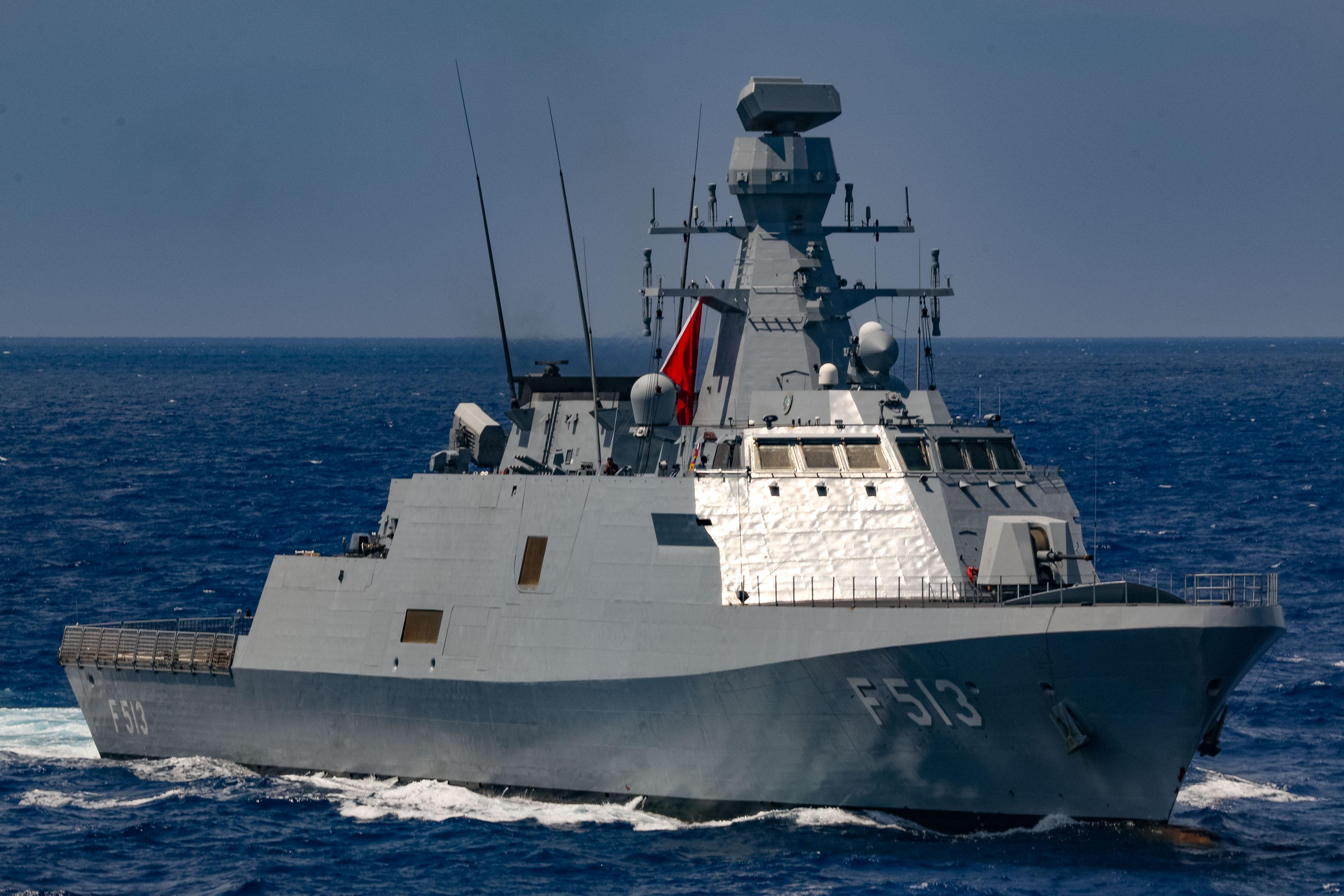
TCG Burgazada

- Builders: Turkey (Istanbul Naval Shipyard)
- Type: Corvette (Patrol and Anti-Submarine Warfare)
- Displacement: 2400 tons
- length: 99.56 meters
- Beam: 14.40 meters
- Draft: 3.90 meters
- Propulsion: 1 gas turbine, 2 diesels, 2 shafts
- Speed: 30 knots
- Range: 3,500 nautical miles
- Complement: 93 including aviation officers, with accommodation for up to 106
- Armament: 1 × 76 mm (retractable for lower radar cross section, guidance by fire control radar and electro-optical systems), A position, 2 × 12.7 mm Aselsan STAMP Stabilized Machine Gun Platform (guidance by Laser/IR/TV and electro-optical systems, automatic and manual modes), B position, 8 Harpoon SSM, 21 × RAM (PDMS), 2 × 324 mm Mk 32 triple launchers for Mk 46 torpedoes
- Ships in class: 10
- Commissioned: 2011–present
- Status: In service
- Operators: Turkish Navy : 5 in service, Pakistan Navy : 1 in service(3 Launched), Ukrainian Navy : (1 under construction)

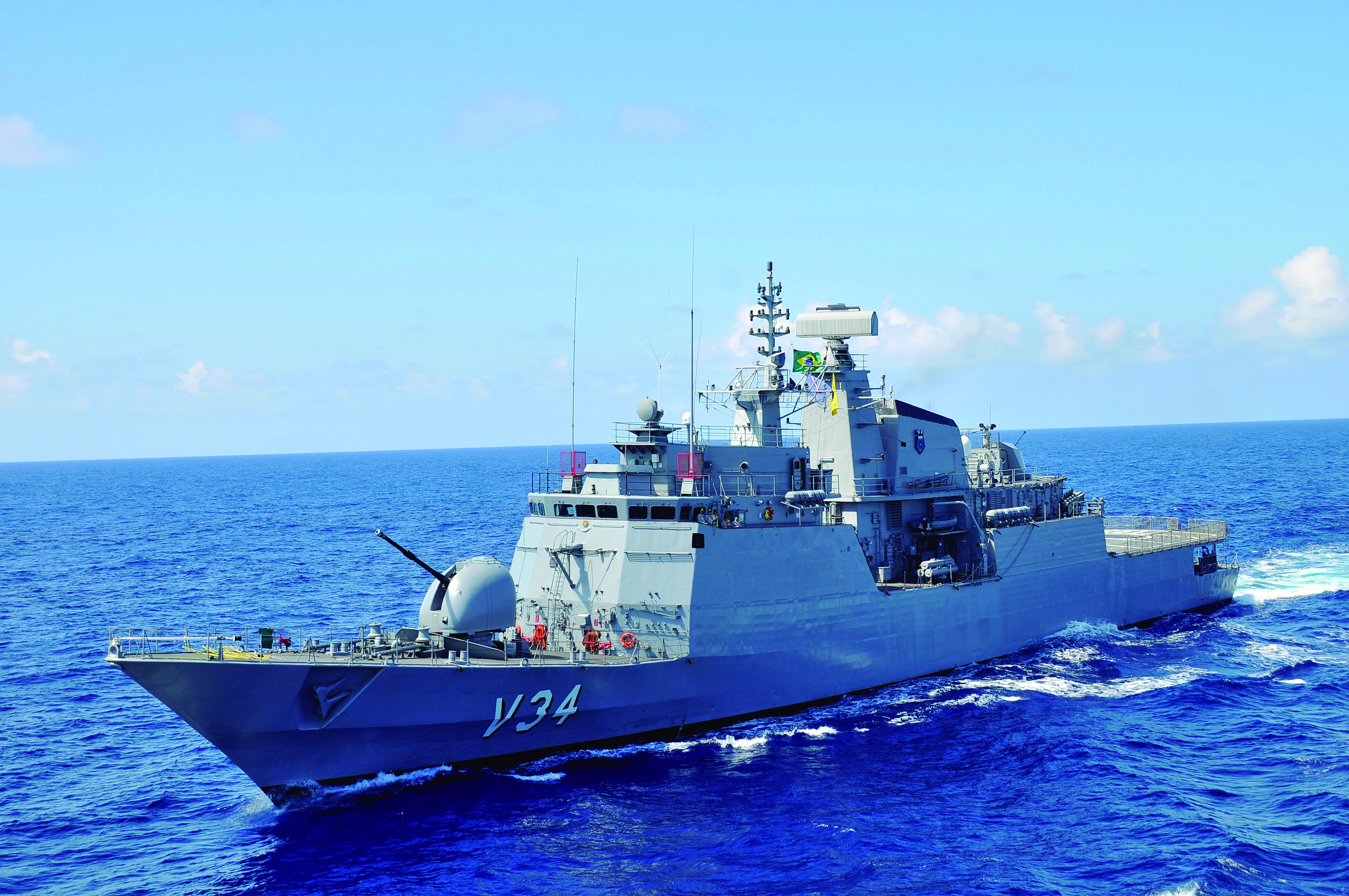
Barroso

== Barroso-class corvette ==
- Builder: Brazil
- Displacement: 2,350 tons full load
- length: 103.4 meters
- Beam: 11.4 meters
- Draft: 5.3 meters
- Propulsion: CODOG arrangement: 1 gas turbine (27500shp), 2 diesels, 2 shafts
- Speed: 27+ knots
- Range: 4,000 nautical miles at 15 knots
- Complement: 154
- Armament: 1 × 4.5 in (113 mm) Vickers Mk 8 gun, 1 × 40 mm Bofors Trinity Mk 3 gun, 4 × MBDA Exocet MM40 Block 2/3, 2 × ARES SLT Mod 400 triple-tube (324 mm) launchers for Mk 46 Mod 5 ASW torpedoes
- Ships in class: 1
- Commissioned: 2008–present
- Operator: Brazilian Navy: 1 in service

== Bora (Project 1239 Sivuch)-class corvette ==
- Builder: Russia
- Displacement: 1,050 tons
- Operator: Russian Navy: 2 in service

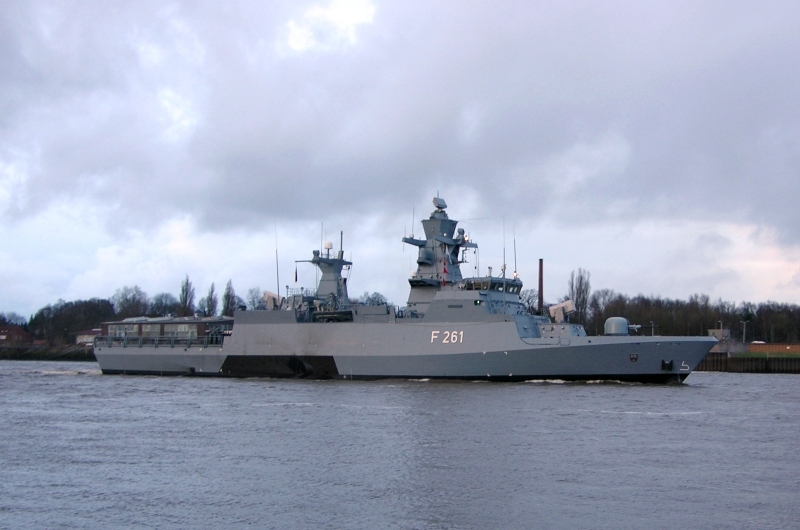
Magdeburg

== Braunschweig-class corvette ==
- Builders: Germany
- Type: Corvette
- Displacement: 1,840 tonnes
- Propulsion: 2 diesel-engines, 7.4 MW each, driving 2 controllable pitch propellers
- Speed: > 26 kn (48 km/h)
- Range: approx. 4,000 nmi (7,400 km) at 15 kn (28 km/h)
- Aircraft: 2 Camcopter S-100 UAVs
- Armament:
  - 1 Otobreda 76 mm dual-purpose gun
  - 2 MLG 27 mm autocannons
  - 2 × 21 cell RAM launcher
  - 2 × 2 cell launcher with RBS-15 Mk3 surface-to-surface missiles with land-attack capability
  - mine laying capability
- Countermeasures
  - TKWA/MASS (Multi Ammunition Softkill System)
  - UL 5000 K ECM suite
- Ships in class: 5
- Operator: German Navy
- Commissioned: 2008–2009
- Status: In active service

== Bung Tomo-class corvette ==
- Builders: United Kingdom
- Type: Corvette
- Displacement: 1,940 tonnes
- Propulsion: 4 diesel engine; 2 shaft; 30.2 MW total power
- Speed: 30 kn (56 km/h)
- Range: approx. 5,000 nmi (9,300 km) at 12 kn (22 km/h)
- Armament:
  - 1 × OTO Melara 76 mm
  - 2 × DS 30B REMSIG 30 mm guns
  - 16 × Vertical launching system for MBDA (BAE Systems) MICA SAM launcher
  - 2 × 4 Exocet MM40 Block II missile launchers
  - 2 × triple BAE Systems Mark 32 Surface Vessel Torpedo Tubes
- Ships in class: 3
- Operator: Indonesian Navy
- Commissioned: 2014
- Status: In active service

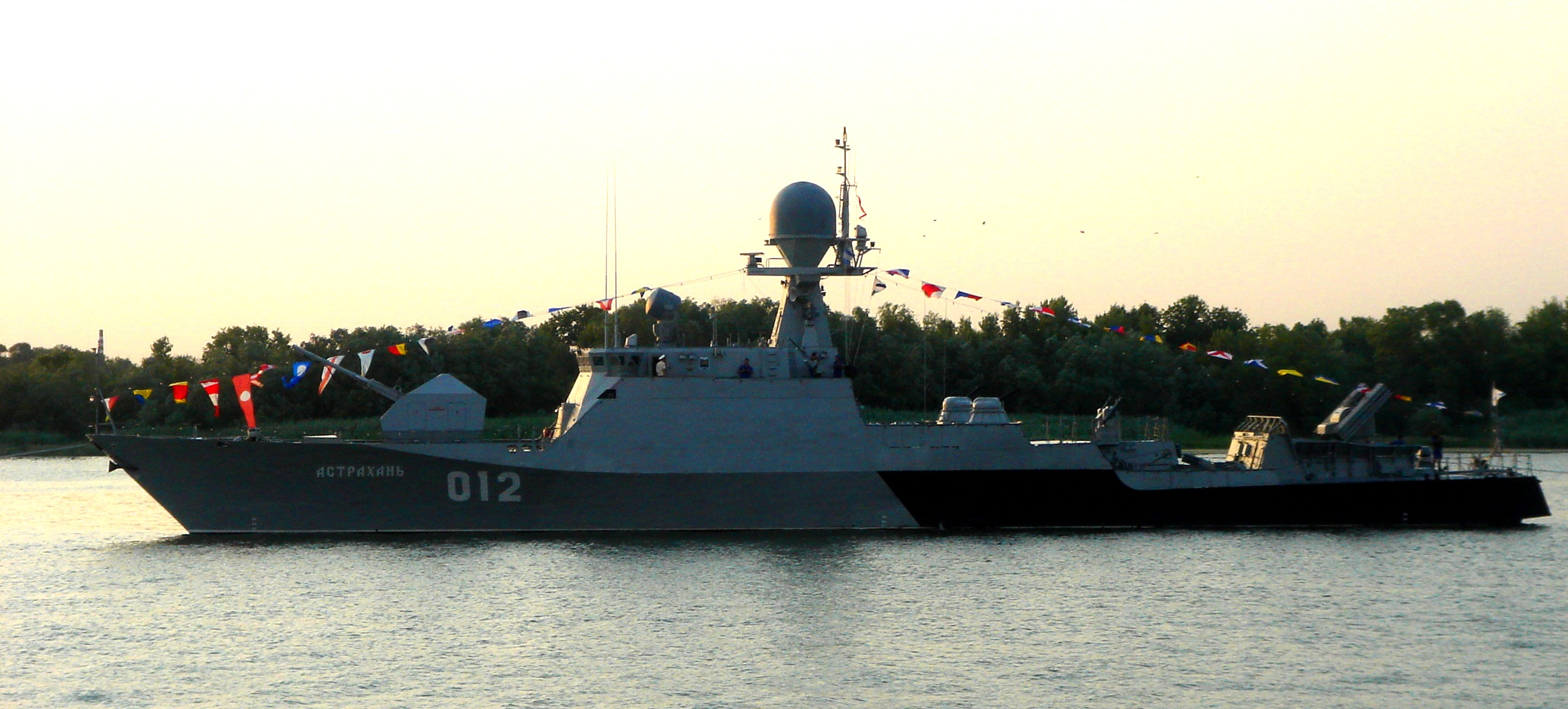
Astrakhan

== Buyan-class corvette ==
- Builders: Russia
- Type: Corvette
- Displacement: 550 tonnes
- Propulsion: 2 shaft CODAD
- Speed: 28 kn (52 km/h)
- Range: approx. 1,500 nmi (2,800 km) at 17 kn (31 km/h)
- Armament:
  - 1 × Arsenal A-190 100 mm
  - 2 × MTPU pedestal machine gun 14.5 mm
  - 2 × AK-630M 30 mm
  - 1 × 4 3M-47 Gibka a-a missile system of short-range
  - 1 × 40 A-215 "Grad-M" 122 mm rocket launcher
- Countermeasures
  - Fire control radar: «Pozitiv-M1.2» flat active phased array air/surface radar
  - Sonar: «Anapa-M»
- Ships in class: 3
- Operator: Russian Navy
- Commissioned: 2006
- Status: In active service

== Durjoy-class corvette ==
- Builders: China (Wuchang Shipyard), Bangladesh (Khulna Shipyard)
- Type: Corvette
- Displacement: 650 tonnes
- Armament: 4 × C-704 AShM; 1 × H/PJ-26 76 mm main gun, forward; 2 × Type 730B 6-barrel 30 mm CIWS; 12 × Super Barricade chaff launchers; Torpedo launchers
- Speed: 28 knots
- Range: 2,500 nmi
- Ships in class: 2
- Operator: Bangladesh Navy
- Commissioned: 2012
- Status: 2 in active service;

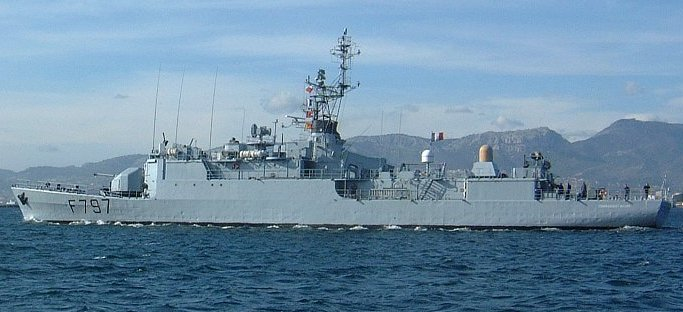
Commandant Bouan

== D'Estienne d'Orves (Type A69)-class aviso ==
- Builders: France
- Type: Aviso
- Displacement: 1,250 tons
- Armament: 2 Exocet MM38 SSM; 1 × 100 mm gun; 2 × 20 mm guns; 4 machineguns; 1 rocket launcher; 4 L5 torpedoes
- Powerplant: 2 Pielstick diesel engines; 2 shafts; 12,000 shp total power
- Speed: 24 knots
- Range: 4,500 nmi at 15 knots
- Ships in class: 20
- Operator: French Navy, Argentine Navy, Turkish Navy
- Commissioned: 1979
- Status: 18 in active service (9 with France, 6 with Turkey, and 3 with Argentina);

== Diponegoro (Sigma 9113)-class corvette ==
- Builders: Netherlands
- Type: Corvette
- Displacement: 1,720 tonnes
- Speed: 28 kn (52 km/h)
- Range: approx. 4,800 nmi (8,900 km) at 14 kn (26 km/h)
- Ships in class: 4
- Operator: Indonesian Navy
- Commissioned: 2007
- Status: In active service

== Espora (MEKO 140A16)-class corvette ==
- Builder: Germany Argentina
- Displacement: 1,790 tons (full load)
- Operator: Argentine Navy: 6 in service

== Fatahillah-class corvette ==
- Builders: Netherlands
- Type: Corvette
- Displacement: 1,450 tonnes
- Propulsion: CODOG: 1 gas turbine, 2 diesel engine; 2 shaft
- Speed: 30 kn (56 km/h)
- Range: approx. 1,780 nmi (3,300 km)
- Armament:
  - 1 × Bofors 120 mm gun model 1950
  - 1 × Bofors 40 mm anti-aircraft gun
  - 2 × 20 mm cannon
  - 4 × Exocet MM 38 anti-ship missiles
  - 1 × Bofors 375 mm twin anti-submarine rocket launcher
  - 2 × Mk 32 launchers for 324 mm torpedoes
- Ships in class: 3
- Operator: Indonesian Navy
- Commissioned: 1979
- Status: In active service

== Freedom-class littoral combat ship ==
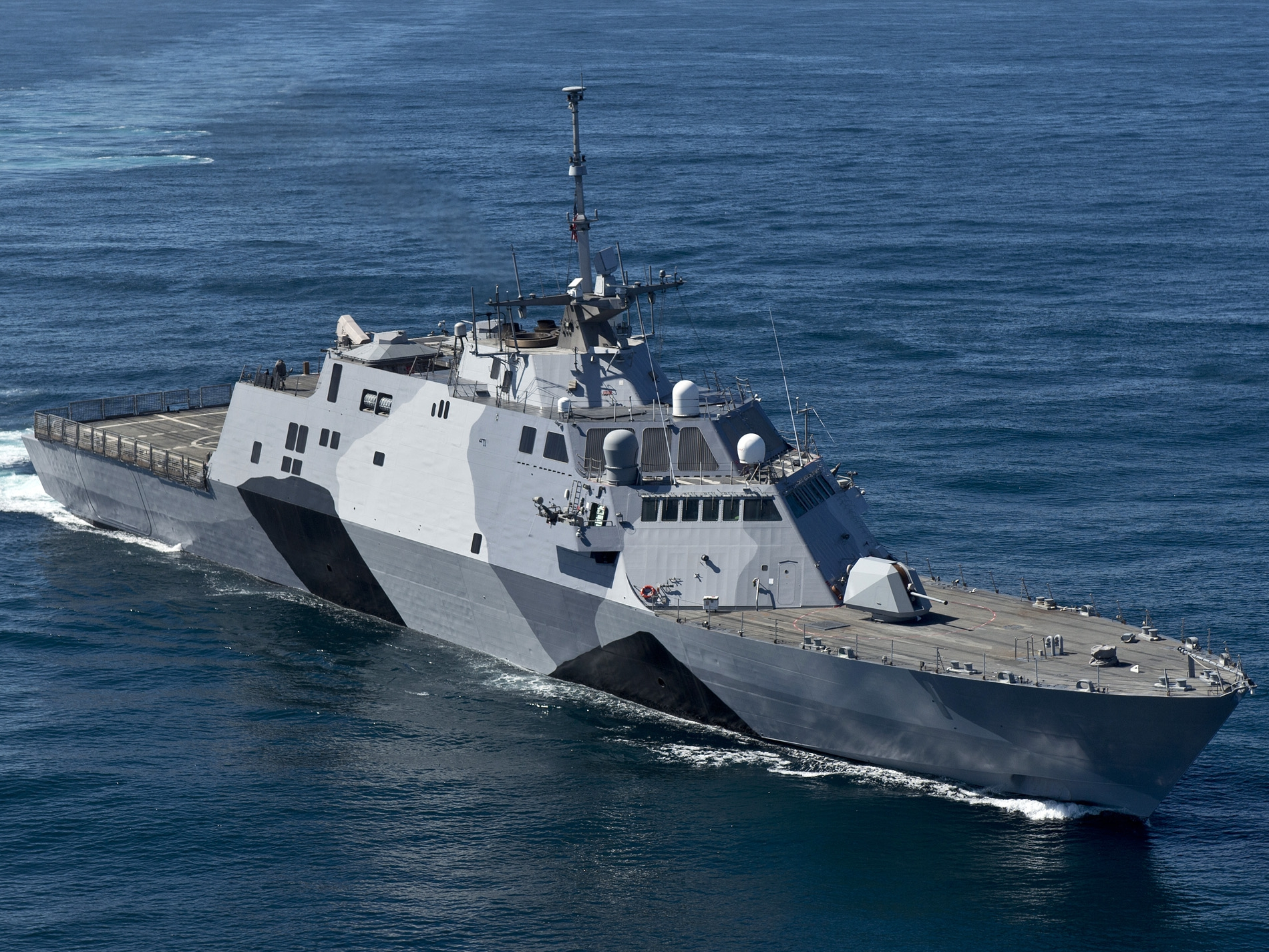
Freedom

- Builder: United States Marinette Marine
- Displacement: 3,500 tons (full load)
- Armament:
  - 1 × BAE Systems Mk 110 57 mm gun
  - 1 × Mk 49 Launcher with 21 × RIM-116 Rolling Airframe Surface to Air Missiles
  - 4 × .50 in machine guns
  - 2 × 30 mm Mk 44 Bushmaster II guns (SUW Module)
  - 24 × AGM-114 Hellfire missiles (SUW Module)
- Operator: United States Navy: 9 active

== Göteborg-class corvette ==
- Builder: Sweden Kockums
- Displacement: 400 tons
- Operators: Swedish Navy: 2 active, 2 decommissioned and 2 cancelled

== Independence-class littoral combat ship ==
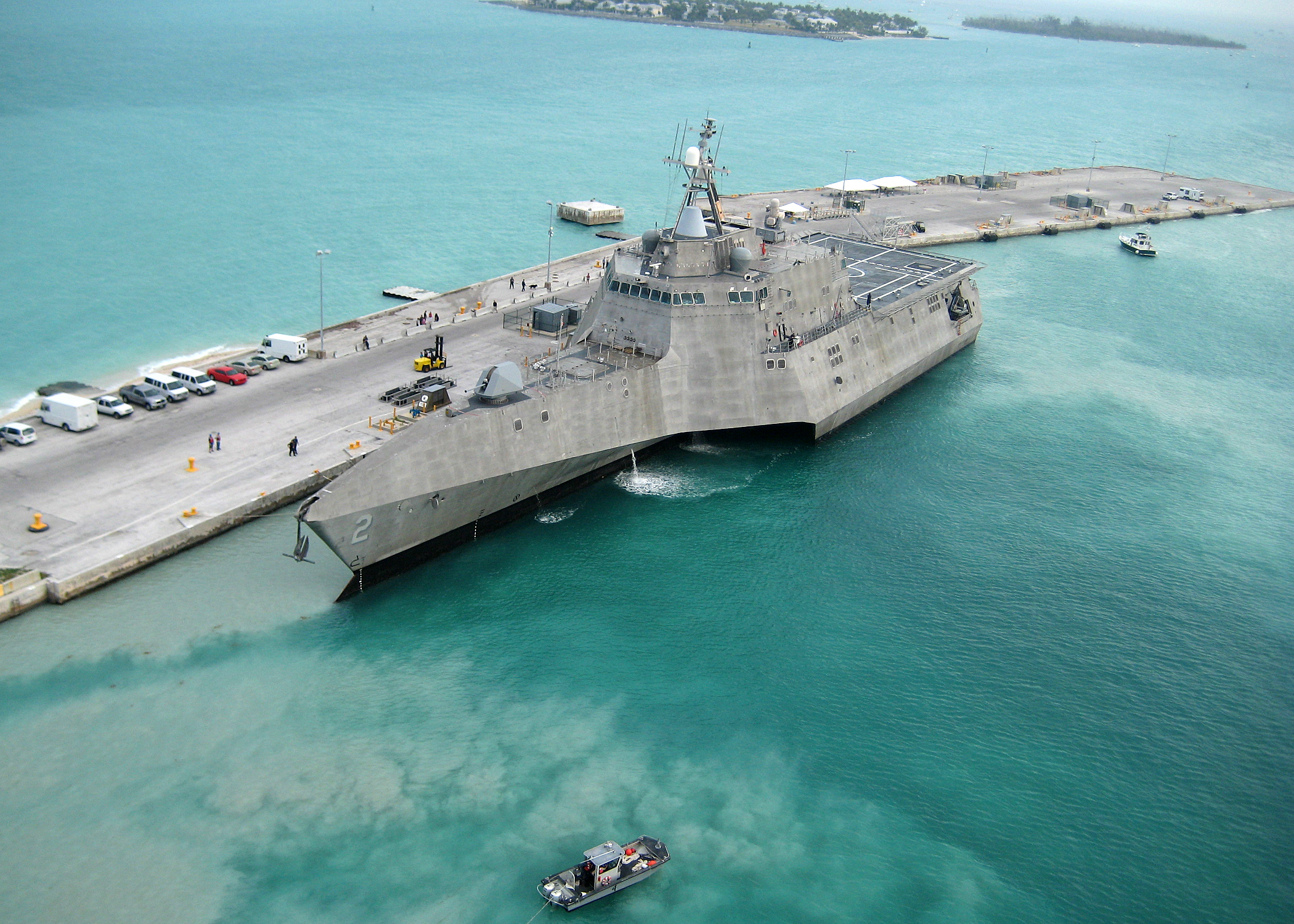
Independence

- Builder: United States Austal USA
- Displacement: 3,104 tons (full load)
- Armament:
  - 1 × BAE Systems Mk 110 57 mm gun
  - 1 × SeaRAM CIWS
  - 4 × .50 cal guns
  - 2 × 30 mm Mk 44 Bushmaster II guns (SUW Module)
  - 24 × AGM-114 Hellfire missiles (SUW Module)
- Operator: United States Navy: 13 active

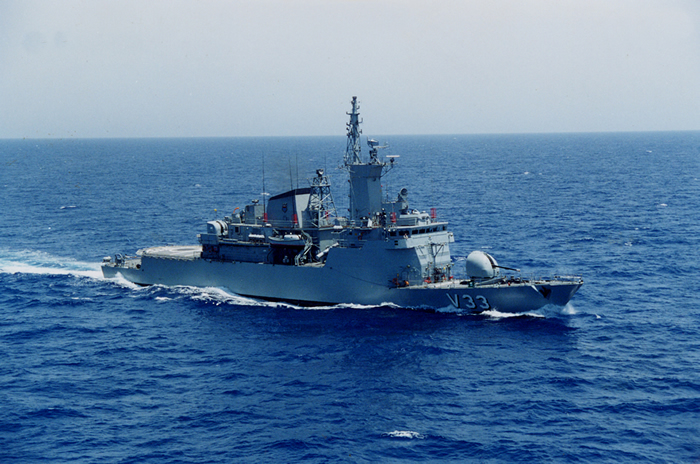
Frotin

== Inhaúma-class corvette ==
- Builder: Brazil
- Displacement: 1,970 tons (full load)
- Operator: Brazilian Navy: 2 in service

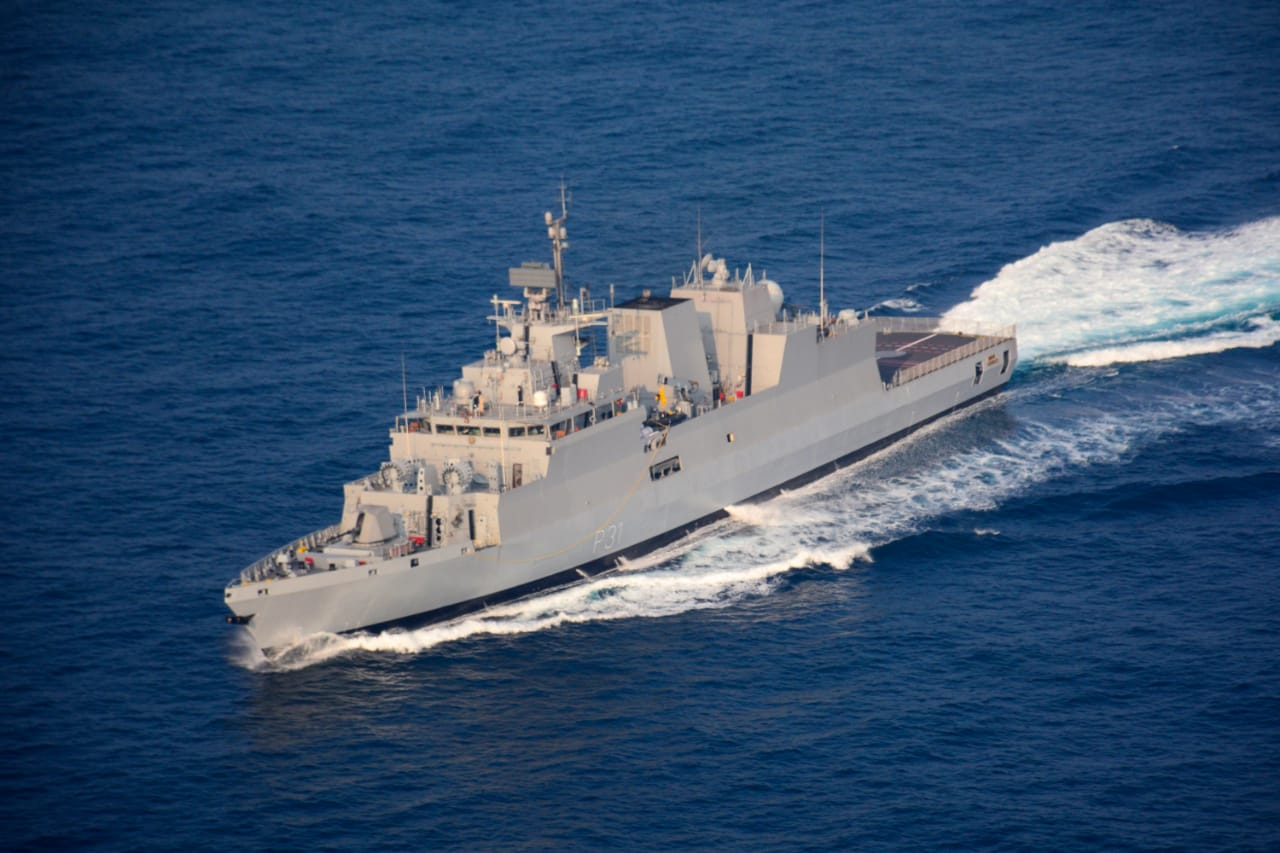
INS Kavaratti

== Kamorta-class corvette ==
- Builders: India Garden Reach Shipbuilders and Engineers
- Type: Corvette
- Displacement:
  - Full load: 3300 tonnes
- Length: 109 metres
- Beam: 13.7 metres
- Propulsion: 4 × CODAD diesel engines
- Speed: 25 knots
- Range: 3,700 miles at 16 knots
- Complement: 193 including 13 officers
- Armament:
  - 1 × 76mm SRGM
  - 2 × AK-630M close-in weapon system
  - 2 × RBU-6000 anti-submarine rocket launcher
  - 4 × 533 mm torpedo tubes
- Ships in class: 4
- Operator: Indian Navy
- Commissioned: 2014–19
- Status: 4 in service

== Khukri-class corvette ==
- Builders: India Mazagon Dock Limited, Garden Reach Shipbuilders and Engineers
- Type: Corvette
- Displacement: Full load: 1,350 tonnes
- Length: 91.1 metres
- Beam: 10.5 metres
- Draught: 4.5 metres
- Propulsion: 2 diesel engines, 14,400 hp each, 2 shafts and cp props
- Speed: 25 knots
- Range: 4,000 miles at 16 knots
- Complement: 79 including 10 officers
- Armament:
  - 1 × AK-176 76 mm gun
  - 16 × Kh-35
  - 2 × Strela-2M SAM MANPADS
  - 2 × AK-630 CIWS
- Ships in class: 4
- Operator: Indian Navy (2 ships), Vietnam People's Navy (1 ship)
- Commissioned: 1989–1991
- Status: 3 ships in service, 1 decommissioned

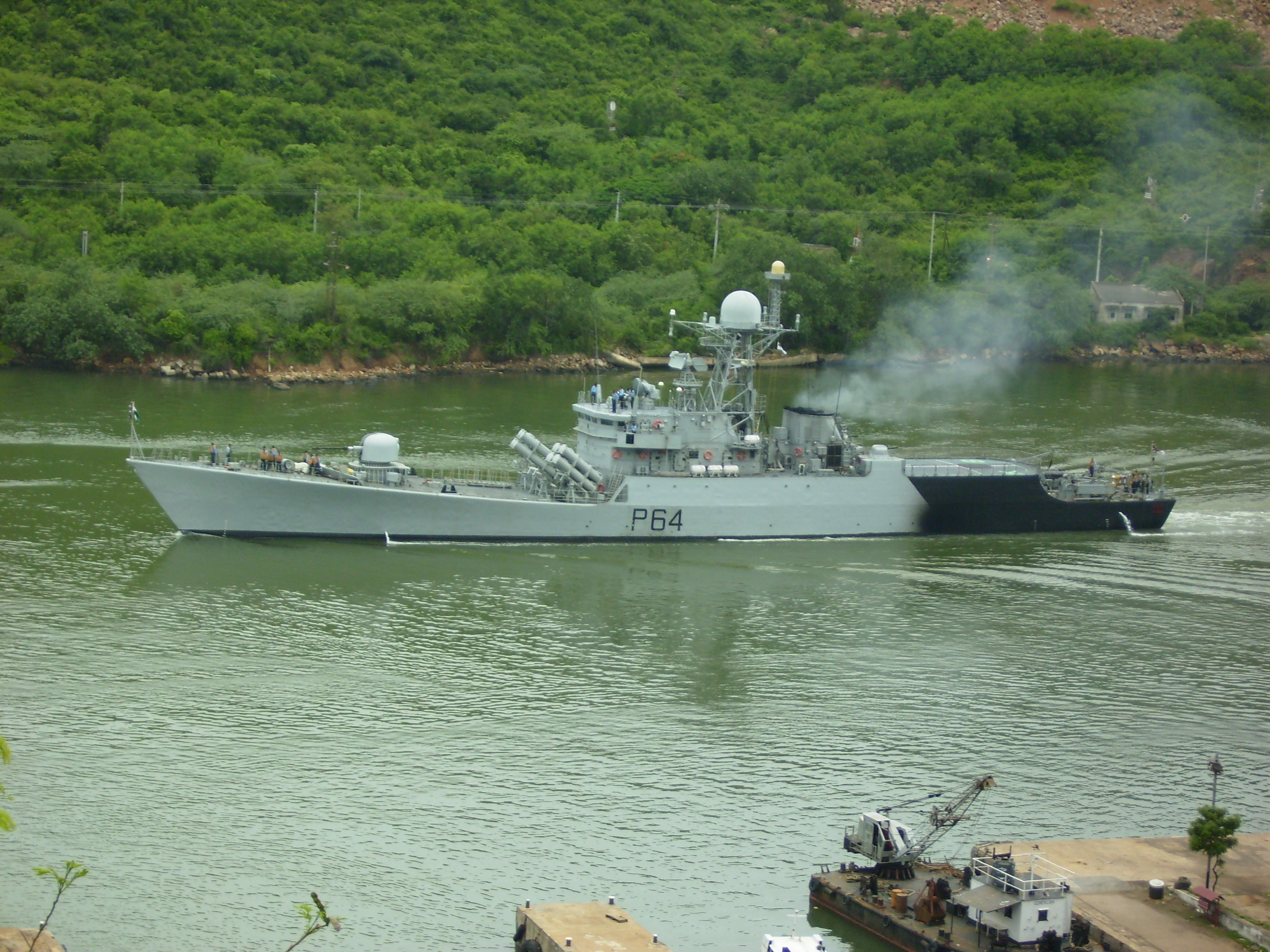
INS Karmuk

== Kora-class corvette ==
- Builders: India Garden Reach Shipbuilders and Engineers
- Type: Corvette
- Displacement:
  - Standard: 1350 tonnes
  - Full load: 1500 tonnes
- Length: 91.1 metres
- Beam: 10.5 metres
- Draught: 4.5 metres
- Propulsion: 2 diesel engines, 14,400 hp each, 2 shafts and cp props
- Speed: 25 knots
- Range: 4,000 miles at 16 knots
- Complement: 79 including 10 officers
- Armament:
  - 1 × AK-176 76 mm gun
  - 4 × P-20M missiles
  - 2 × Strela-2M or Igla-1E MANPADS
  - 2 × AK-630 CIWS
- Ships in class: 4
- Operator: Indian Navy
- Commissioned: 1998–2004
- Status: In service

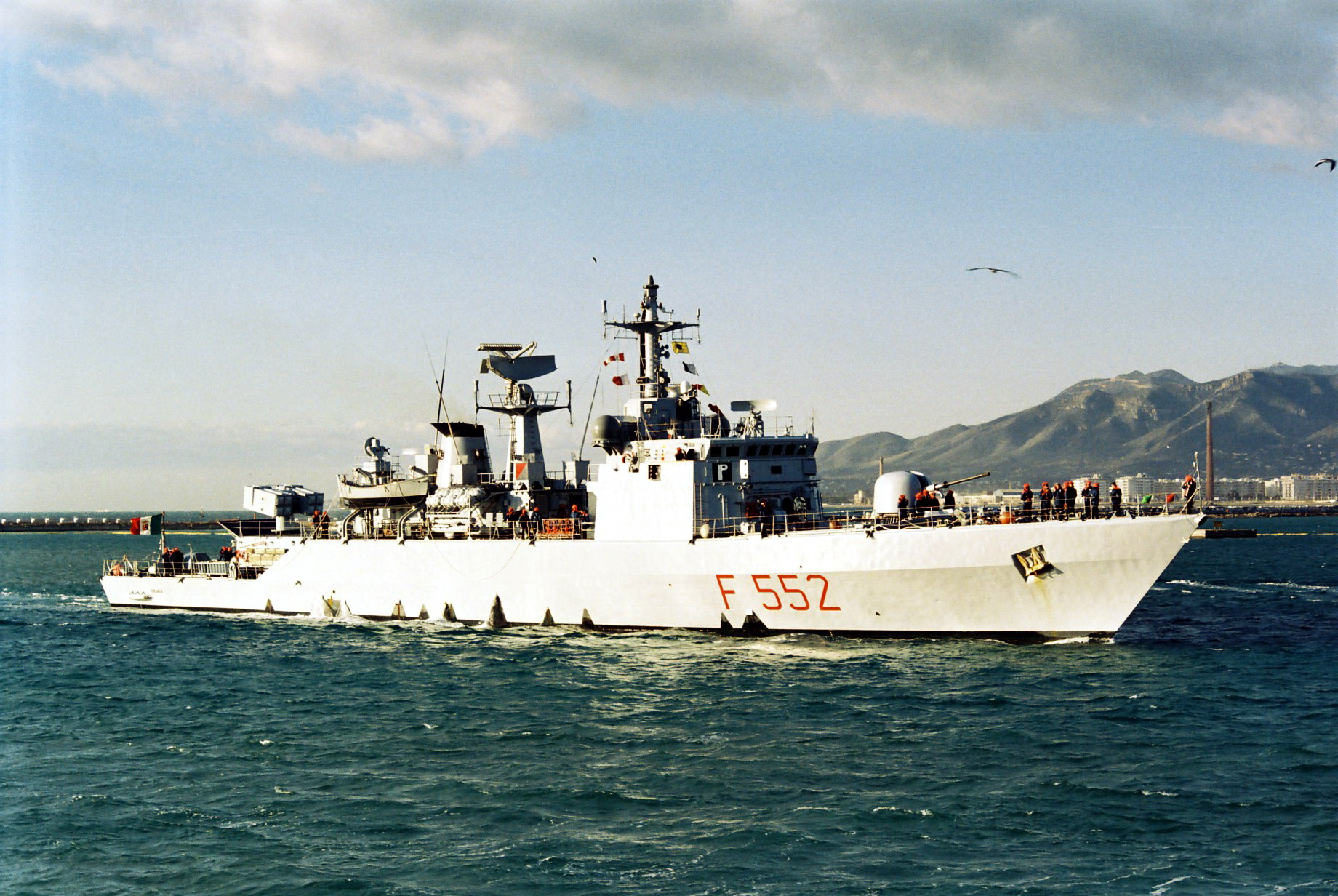
Urania

== Minerva-class corvette ==
- Builder: Italy
- Displacement: 1285 tons
- Operators: Marina Militare: 6 in service

== Nanuchka (Project 1234)-class corvette ==
- Builder: Soviet Union
- Displacement: 730 tons
- Operators: Russian Navy: 17 Nanuchka III in service plus 1 Nanuchka IV

== Pohang-class corvette ==
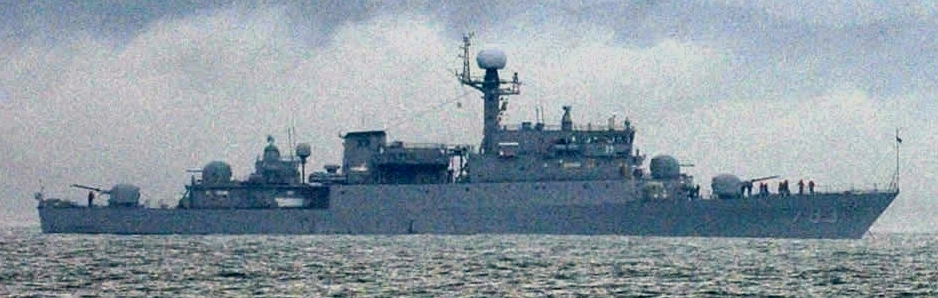
Pohang

- Builders: South Korea
- Ships in class: 24
- Displacement: 1,350 tons
- Speed: 32 knots
- Basic Armament:
  - 2 × OTO Melara 76 mm/62 compact cannon
  - 2 × Nobong 40mm/70 twin cannons
  - 2 × Mark 32 triple torpedo tubes (with 6× Blue Shark torpedoes)
  - 12 × Mark 9 depth charges
- Optional Armament:
  - 4 × SSM (Exocet, Harpoon, 700K C-Star)
  - Mistral MANPADS
- Operators:
  - Republic of Korea Navy : 7 active
  - Colombian National Navy: 1 active
  - Egyptian Navy 1 active
  - Peruvian Navy: 2 active
  - Philippine Navy: 1 active, 1 awaiting transfer
  - Vietnam People's Navy: 2 active

== Parchim (Project 133)-class corvette ==
- Builder: East Germany
- Displacement: 935 tons
- Ships in class: 28
- Operator: Indonesian Navy: 14 in service, Russian Navy: 6 in service

== Peacock-class corvette ==
- Builder: United Kingdom
- Displacement: 712 tons
- Armament: Irish Naval Service: 1 × 76mm OTO Melara; 2 × 20mm; 2 × 12.7mm
- Speed 25 knots (Sprint speed 30 knots)
- Ships in class: 5
- Commissioned: 1983–85
- Operators:
  - Irish Naval Service: 2 delivered in 1988
  - Philippine Navy: 3 delivered in 1997

== Sa'ar 5 (Eilat)-class corvette ==
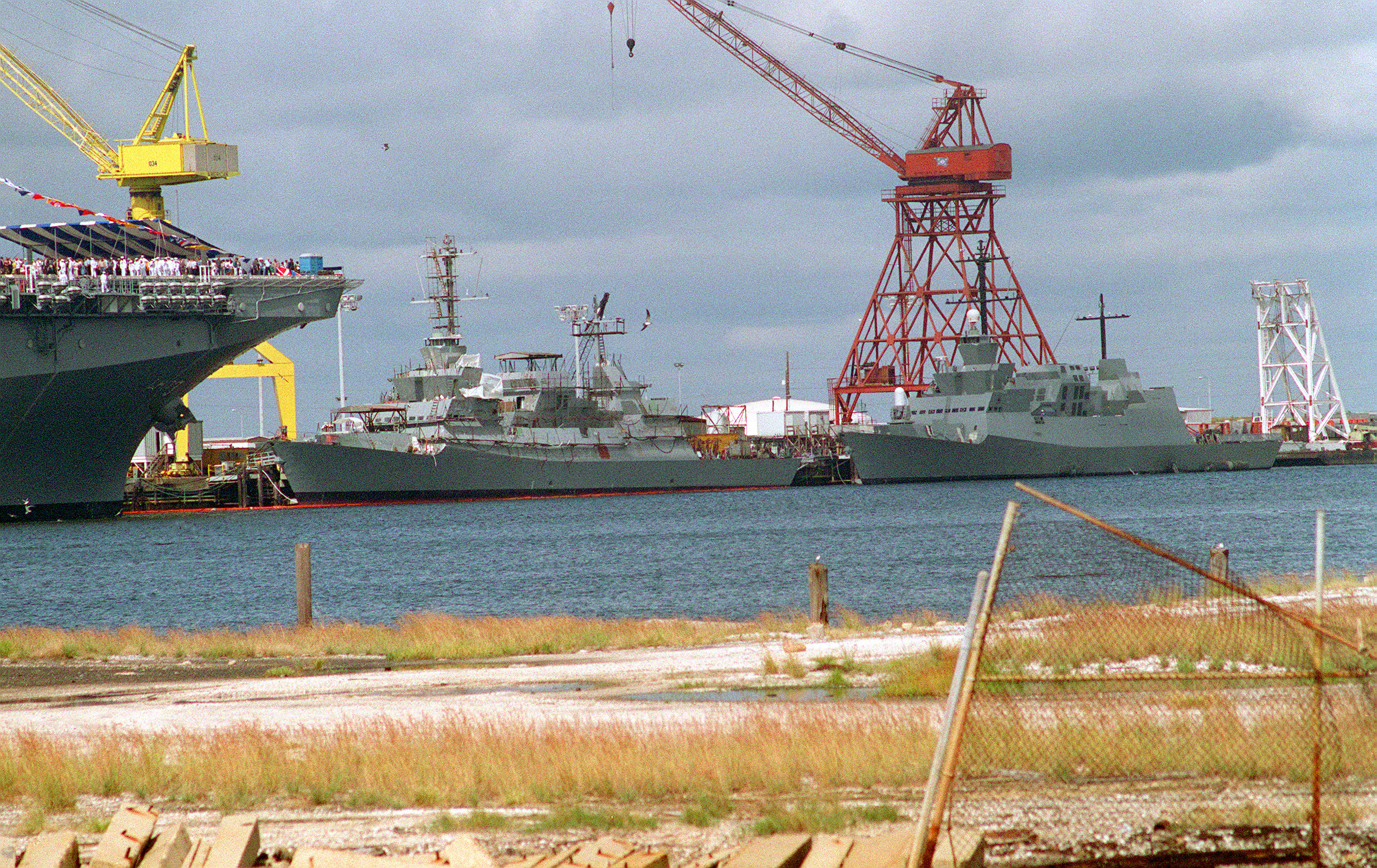
Eilat and Lahav

- Builders: United States (Ingalls Shipbuilding)
- Type: Guided-missile corvette
- Displacement: 1227 tons
- Armament: 8 Harpoon SSM;; 8 Gabriel SSM; 2 Barak 1 launchers; 20 mm Phalanx CIWS; 2 × Mk 32 torpedo launchers (6 tubes)
- Powerplant: 1 General Electric LM-2500 gas turbine; 2 MTU type 12V1163 TB82 diesels; total SHP 30,000
- Speed: 32 knots (59 km/h)
- Range: 3,500 nautical miles (6,480 km)
- Ships in class: 3
- Operator: Israeli Navy
- Commissioned: February 1993
- Status: In active service

== Skjold-class corvette ==
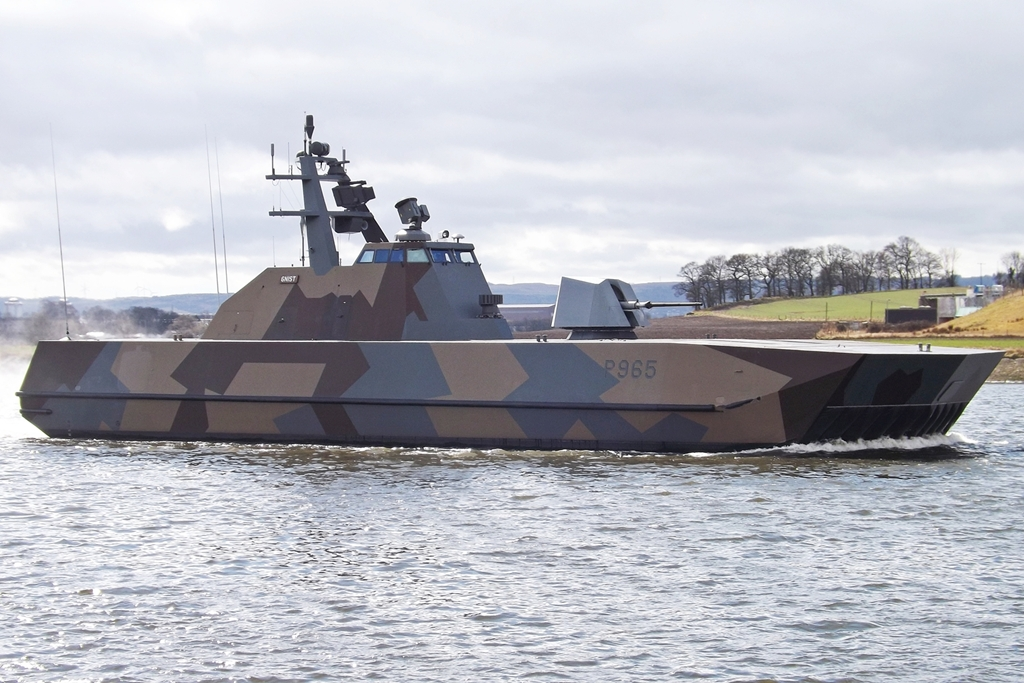
Skjold-class corvette

- Builders: Norway (Umoe Mandal AS)
- Type: Corvette (stealth missile corvette)
- Displacement: 274 tonnes full load
- length: 47.50 meters
- Beam: 13.5 meters
- Draft: 1.0 meter
- Propulsion:
  - 2 × Pratt & Whitney ST18M plus
  - 2 × Pratt & Whitney ST40M gas turbines
- Speed: 60 knots
- Range: 800 nmi (1,500 km) at 40 knots (74 km/h)
- Complement: Officially 20+, reported to work with lower numbers in peacetime.
- Armament:
  - 8 × Kongsberg Naval Strike Missile SSMs, kept in an internal weapons bay
  - 1 × 76mm Otobreda Super Rapid multi-role cannon
  - 2 × 12.7mm Browning M2HB HMGs
  - Portable SIMBAD version Mistral SAMs
  - Protector (RWS) (Sea Protector)
- Ships in class: 6
- Commissioned: 1999–present
- Status: In service
- Operators: Royal Norwegian Navy: 6 in service

== Steregushchiy-class corvette ==
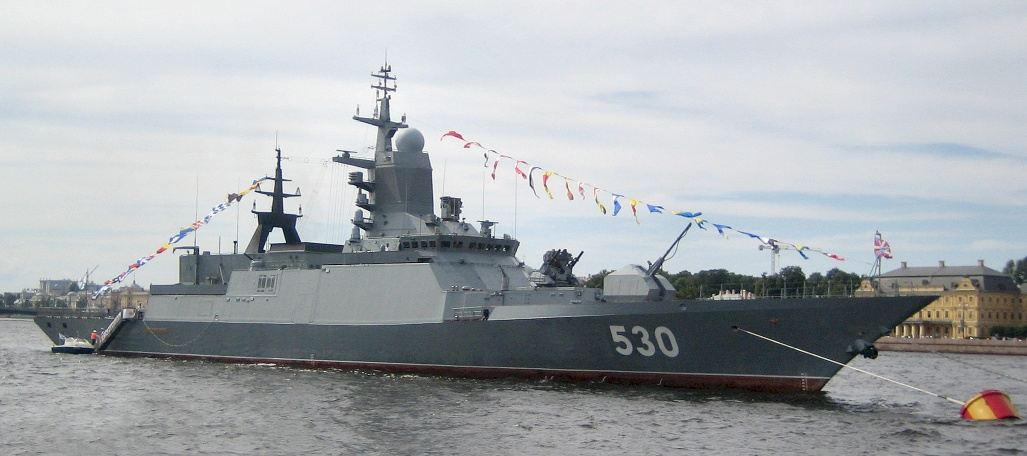
Steregushchy

- Builders: Russia
- Type: Corvette
- Displacement: 1,950 tonnes
- Propulsion: 2 shaft CODAD, 4 16D49 diesels 24.000 hp (17.9 MW), power supply AC 380/220V, 50 Hz, 4 × 630 kW diesel genset
- Speed: 27 kn (50 km/h)
- Range: approx. 4,000 nmi (7,400 km) at 17 kn (31 km/h)
- Aircraft: 1 Kamov Ka-27
- Armament:
  - 1 × Arsenal A-190 100 mm
  - 2 × MTPU pedestal machine gun 14.5 mm
  - 2 × AK-630M 30 mm
  - 1 × Kashtan-M CADS
  - 8 × Kh-35 missiles
  - 4 × 400 mm torpedo tubes
- Countermeasures
  - Fire control radar: Ratep 5P-10E Puma for A-190
    HOT FLASH radar
  - Air search radar: Furke-E 3D, E/F band
  - Sonar: Zarya-ME suite, bow mounted. Vinyetka low frequency active/passive towed array
- Ships in class: 3 + 3 Laid down
- Operator: Russian Navy
- Commissioned: 2007
- Status: In active service

== Veer-class corvette ==
- Builders: India Mazagon Dock Limited; Garden Reach Shipbuilders and Engineers
- Type: Corvette
- Displacement: 455-477 tonnes
- Length: 56.1 metres
- Beam: 11.5 metres
- Draught: 2.5 metres
- Propulsion: 2 × COGAG gas turbines couples to two shafts
- Speed: 36 knots
- Range: 2,300 miles at 16 knots
- Complement: 41 including 5 officers
- Armament:
  - 1 × 76mm SRGM
  - 2 × AK-630M close-in weapon system
  - 2 × RBU-6000 anti-submarine rocket launcher
  - 4-16 × anti-ship missiles
  - 4 × air defense missiles
- Ships in class: 15
- Commissioned: 1987–2002
- Status: 13 completed, 2 cancelled, 8 active, 4 retired and 1 lost

== Visby-class corvette ==
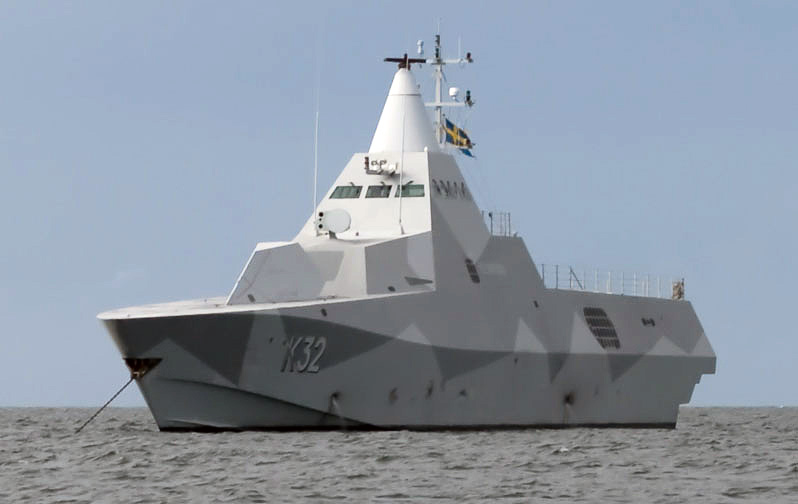
Visby

- Builders: Sweden
- Type: Corvette
- Displacement: 640 tonnes
- Propulsion: CODOG, 2 × 125SII Kamewa Waterjets, 4 × Vericor TF50A gas turbines, total rating 16 MW[2], 2 × MTU Friedrichshafen 16 V 2000 N90 diesel engines, total rating 2.6 MW, 3 × generators of 270 kW each
