= BNS Sangram =

Corvette of the Bangladesh Navy

History

Bangladesh
- Name: BNS Shongram
- Ordered: 21 July 2015
- Builder: Wuchang Shipyard
- Laid down: 9 August 2016
- Launched: 12 February 2018
- Acquired: 28 March 2019
- Commissioned: 18 June 2020
- Identification: Pennant number: F113
- Status: In service

General characteristics
- Class & type: Type 056 corvette
- Displacement: 1330 tonnes
- Length: 90.1 metres (296 ft)
- Beam: 11.14 metres (36.5 ft)
- Draught: 3.37 metres (11.1 ft)
- Propulsion: 2 x SEMT Pielstick 12PA6 diesel
- Speed: 25 knots (46 km/h; 29 mph)
- Complement: 78 (18 officer)
- Sensors & processing systems: SR 2410C S-band 3D multifunctional radar; Type 348 fire control radar for main gun
- Armament: 1 x H/PJ-26 76 mm main gun; 2 x H/PJ-17 30 mm gun turret; 2 x 2 cell C-802A anti-ship missiles; 1 x 8 cell FL-3000N; 2 × 6-tube Type-87 ASW rocket launchers
- Aviation facilities: Helicopter deck

BNS Shongram is a Type 056 surface warfare guided missile corvette of the Bangladesh Navy. She was built at Wuchang Shipyard of China. She is the third corvette of the class for the Bangladesh Navy.

== Career ==
The Bangladesh Navy signed a contract with the China State Shipbuilding Corporation for second batch of two C-13B version of Type 056 corvettes on 21 July 2015. The ships were laid down at Wuchang Shipyard on 9 August 2016. BNS Shongram was launched on 12 February 2018 and handed over to the Bangladesh Navy on 28 March 2019. She began her delivery voyage from the port of Shanghai, China to Bangladesh on 12 April 2019, with stops at the Yantian port in China and the Port Klang in Malaysia, reaching BNS Issa Khan, Chattogram on 27 April 2019. Shongram was commissioned into the Bangladesh Navy on 18 June 2020.

On 9 August 2020, she departed Chattogram for Lebanon under Captain Faisal Mohammad Arifur Rahman Bhuiyan to join UN peacekeeping operations, UNIFIL. On her way to Lebanon, she made a port call at Mormugao Port, India, on 17 August 2020. She took over from BNS Bijoy which had been damaged in the Beirut explosions. She joined UNIFIL in September 2020.

== Design ==
The ship is 90.1 metres (296 ft) long, has a beam of 11.14 metres (36.5 ft) and a draught of 3.37 metres (11.1 ft). With a displacement of 1,300 tonnes, she has a complement of 78 personnel including 60 sailors and 18 officers. She is propelled by two SEMT Pielstick 12PA6 diesel engines with a distance adjustable tail rotor which can provide enough power for her top speed of more than 25 knots (46 km/h; 29 mph). She has two power stations, forward and rear, and electricity supply works with one of the power station sunk. Compared to the traditional round bilge boat, the ship is designed with V type, having angle bending line at the bottom so that she can sail with high speed in rough sea state. she will act mainly as a surface warfare corvette. BNS Shongram has a helicopter deck aft which can support a medium-size helicopter, but she has no hangar.

=== Electronics ===
The ship uses SMART-S MK2 S-band 3D AESA radar for surface and air search purposes. This radar can also be used for helicopter landing control and as a fire control radar. The radar has a detection range of 250 kilometres (160 mi).

=== Armaments ===
The ship carries one H/PJ-26 76 mm main gun placed forward. Two 2-cell C-802A anti-ship missiles are installed in the ship for anti surface operations. Two H/PJ-17 30 mm remote controlled gun turrets amidships. For air defence, she carries an eight-cell FL-3000N launcher, which is the Chinese equivalent of RAM. The ship also carries two 6-cell Type-87 240mm ASW rocket launchers.

== See also ==
- List of active ships of the Bangladesh Navy
