= BNS Prottasha =

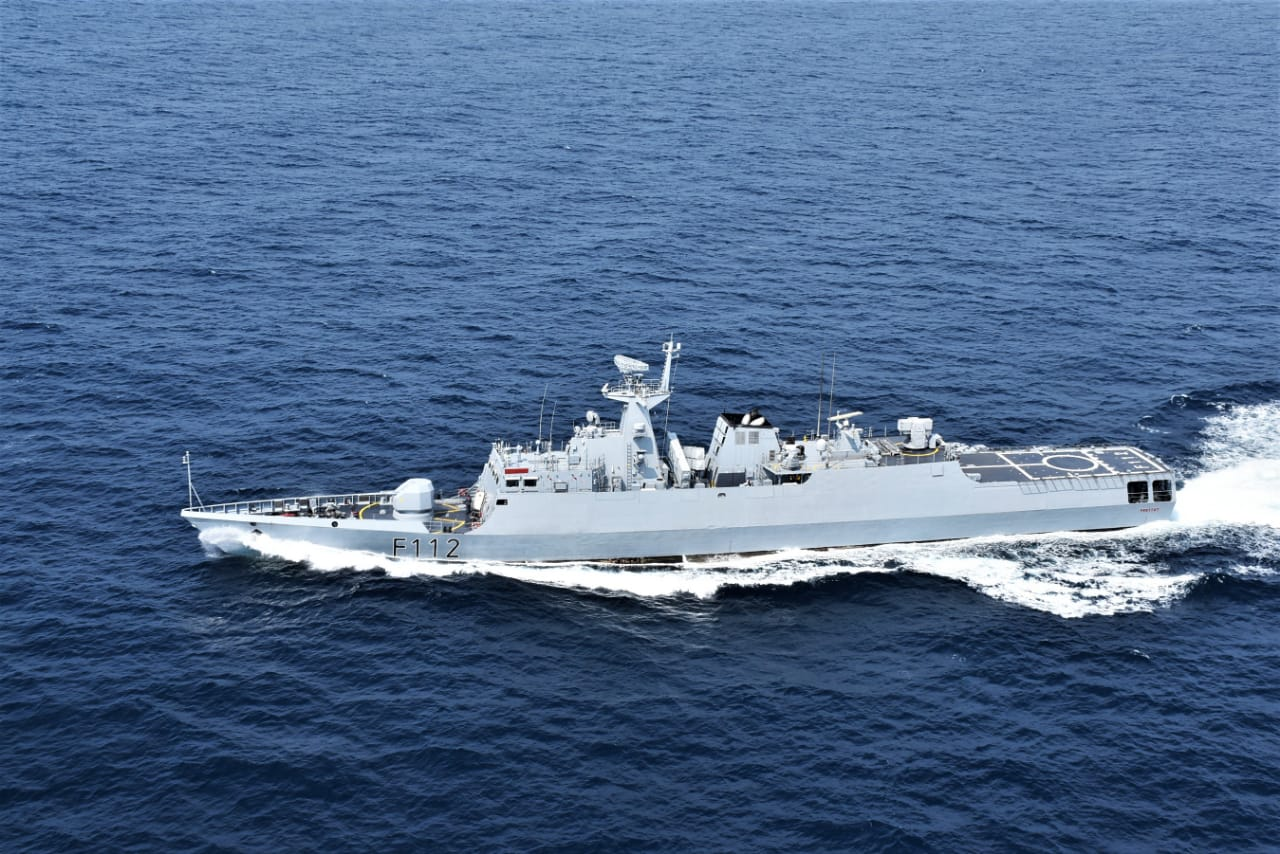
- BNS Prottoy (F112) sistership of BNS Prottasha(F114).

History

Bangladesh
- Name: BNS Prottasha
- Ordered: 21 July 2015
- Builder: Wuchang Shipyard
- Laid down: 9 August 2016
- Launched: 8 April 2018
- Acquired: 28 March 2019
- Commissioned: 5 November 2020
- Identification: Pennant number: F114; MMSI number: 405000234; Callsign: S3VY
- Status: In active service

General characteristics
- Class & type: Type 056 corvette
- Displacement: 1400 tonnes
- Length: 90.1 metres (296 ft)
- Beam: 11.14 metres (36.5 ft)
- Draft: 3.37 metres (11.1 ft)
- Propulsion: 2 x SEMT Pielstick 12PA6 diesel
- Speed: 25 knots (46 km/h; 29 mph)
- Complement: 78 (18 officer)
- Sensors & processing systems: SR2410C S-band 3D multifunctional radar; Type 348 fire control radar for main gun
- Armament: 1 x H/PJ-26 76 mm main gun; 2 x H/PJ-17 30 mm gun turret; 2 x 2 cell C-802A anti-ship missiles; 1 x 8 cell FL-3000N; 2 × 6-tube Type-87 ASW rocket launchers
- Aviation facilities: Helicopter deck

BNS Prottasha is a Type 056 stealth surface warfare guided missile corvette of the Bangladesh Navy. She was built at Wuchang Shipyard of China. She is the fourth corvette of the class for the Bangladesh Navy.

== Career ==
Bangladesh Navy signed a contract with China State Shipbuilding Corporation for second batch of two C-13B version of Type 056 corvettes on 21 July 2015 to China. The ships were laid down at Wuchang Shipyard in China on 9 August 2016. BNS Prottasha was launched on 8 April 2018. China Shipbuilding Industry Corporation (CSIC) handed over the ship to the Bangladesh Navy on 28 April 2019. She started her delivery sail from the port of Shanghai, China to Bangladesh on 12 April 2019. On the way home, she made stoppages at the Yantian port of China and the port Klang of Malaysia. She reached home on 27 April 2019. BNS Prottasha was commissioned to the Bangladesh Navy on 5 November 2020.

BNS Prottasha left for Qatar on 5 March 2022 to take part in 7th Doha International Maritime Exhibition and Conference (DIMDEX-2022), to be held from 21 to 23 March 2022. After completing the exercise, she will sail for India to take part in IONS Maritime Exercise-2022 (IMEX-2022), to be held from 28 to 30 March 2022. The ship is expected to return home on 7 April 2022.

== Design ==
The ship is 90.1 metres (296 ft) long, has a beam of 11.14 metres (36.5 ft) and a draught of 3.37 metres (11.1 ft). With a displacement of 1,300 tonnes, she has a complement of 78 personnel including 60 sailors and 18 officers. She is propelled by two SEMT Pielstick 12PA6 diesel engines with a distance adjustable tail rotor which can provide enough power for her top speed of more than 25 knots (46 km/h; 29 mph). She has two power stations, forward and rear, and electricity supply works with one of the power station sunk. Compared to the traditional round bilge boat, the ship is designed with V type, having angle bending line at the bottom so that she can sail with high speed in rough sea states. However, the ship does not carry any type of sonar so she has limited anti-submarine warfare capability. As a result, she will act mainly as a surface warfare corvette. BNS Prottasha has a helicopter deck aft which can support a medium-size helicopter, but she has no hangar.

=== Armaments ===
The ship carries one H/PJ-26 76 mm main gun placed forward. Two 2-cell C-802A Anti-ship missiles are installed in the ship for anti surface operations. Two H/PJ-17 30 mm remote controlled gun turrets at amidship. For air defence, she carries an eight-cell FL-3000N launcher, which is the Chinese equivalent of RAM. The ship also carries two 6-cell Type-87 240mm ASW rocket launchers.

== See also ==
- List of active ships of the Bangladesh Navy
- Type 056 corvette
