= Type 056 corvette =

Class of Chinese light frigates

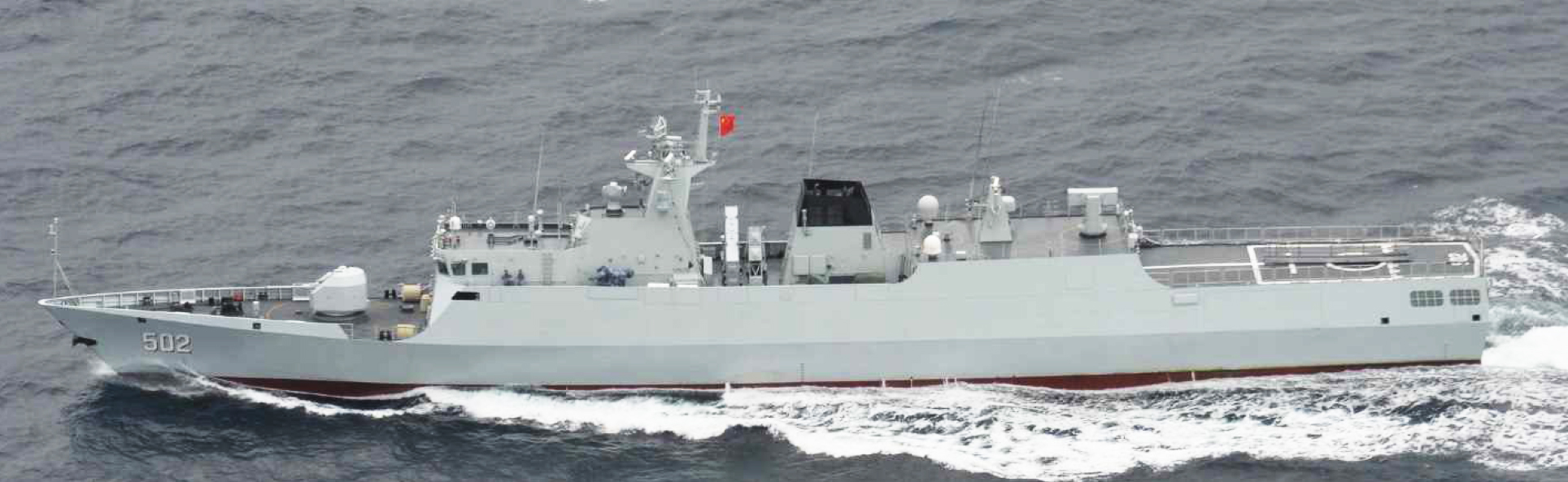
- Type 056A corvette Huangshi

Class overview
- Builders: Hudong-Zhonghua Shipbuilding; CSSC Huangpu Wenchong Shipbuilding; Wuchang Shipyard; Liaonan Shipyard
- Operators: People's Liberation Army Navy; China Coast Guard; Bangladesh Navy (C13B); Nigerian Navy (P18N); Algerian National Navy (F-15A); Royal Cambodian Navy
- Preceded by: Type 037
- Built: 2012–2021
- In commission: 2013–present
- Building: 2 (Cambodian navy)
- Completed: 22 (Type 056); 50 (Type 056A); 4 (C13B); 2 (P18N); 1 (F-15A)
- Active: 50 (PLAN); 22 (China Coast Guard); 7 (Others)

General characteristics
- Type: Corvette (per NATO)
- Displacement: 1,500 tons
- Length: 90 m (295 ft 3 in)
- Beam: 11.14 m (36 ft 7 in)
- Draught: 4 m (13 ft 1 in)
- Propulsion: 2 SEMT Pielstick PA6-STC diesel motors
- Speed: 25 knots (46 km/h; 29 mph)
- Range: 3,500 nmi (6,500 km; 4,000 mi) at 16 kn (30 km/h; 18 mph)
- Complement: 78
- Sensors & processing systems: Type 360 air/surface search radar; Type 347G fire control radar; Bow sonar; Towed array and variable depth sonar (Type 056A)
- Armament: 1 × H/PJ-26 76 mm (3.0 in) gun; 2 × H/PJ-17 30 mm (1.2 in) autocannon; 2× 2-cell YJ-83 anti-ship missiles, amidships; 1 × 8-cell HHQ-10 SAM-based CIWS; 2 × triple 324 mm (12.8 in) torpedo tubes
- Aviation facilities: Helipad for 1 medium-lift helicopter (Harbin Z-9)

The Type 056 corvette (NATO reporting name: Jiangdao-class light frigate) is a class of littoral combat-oriented corvette deployed by the Chinese People's Liberation Army Navy (PLAN). The first ship entered service in March 2013. Later ships were completed with a towed array sonar; these are commonly designated as the Type 056A and entered service in November 2014. The last ship commissioned in February 2021. All of the 22 Type 056s were transferred to the China Coast Guard after removing missiles and torpedoes between mid 2021 and January 2023, with the PLAN retaining 50 Type 056A. Variants were produced for export too.

== History and development ==
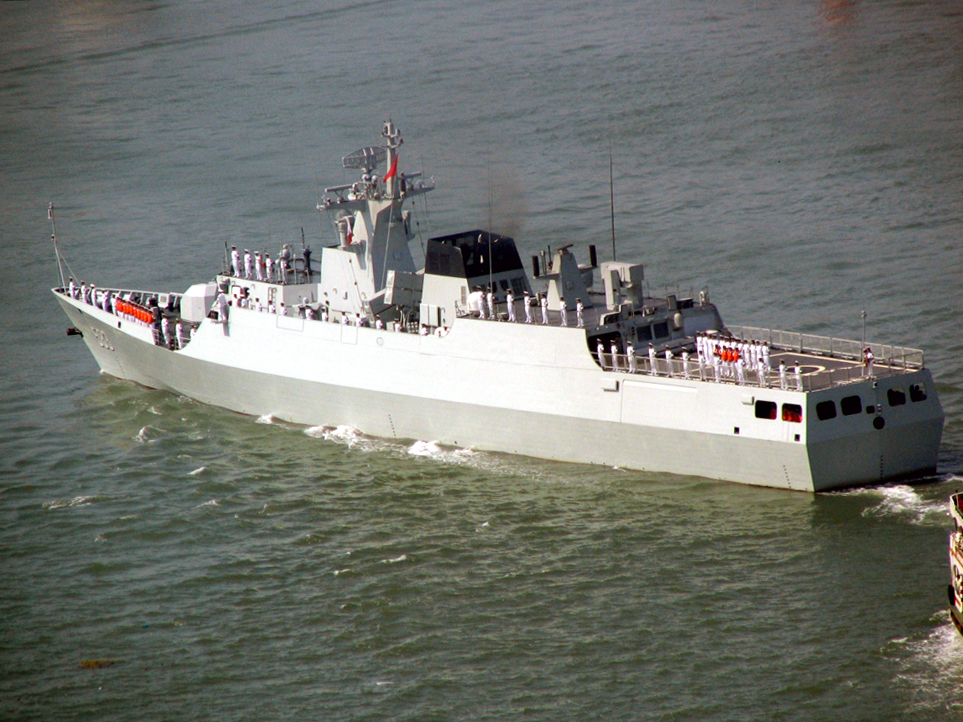
Type 056 corvette Shangrao

The Type 056 hull may have been based on the Pattani-class offshore patrol vessels, which were built in China for Thailand from 2005 to 2006.

In late 2012, four Chinese shipyards were producing the corvettes. They replaced older coastal patrol craft and some of the Type 053H frigates.

The Type 056A were in production by late 2013. The Type 056 series was constructed at a high production rate to enhance the PLAN's littoral warfare capabilities. The last ship commissioned in February 2021. 22 Type 056s and 50 Type 056As were produced.

Starting in mid 2021, the PLAN transferred the 22 original Type 056s to the China Coast Guard. The first 20 Type 056As received new pennant numbers in the new "600" series, which was also used for subsequent production.

== Design ==
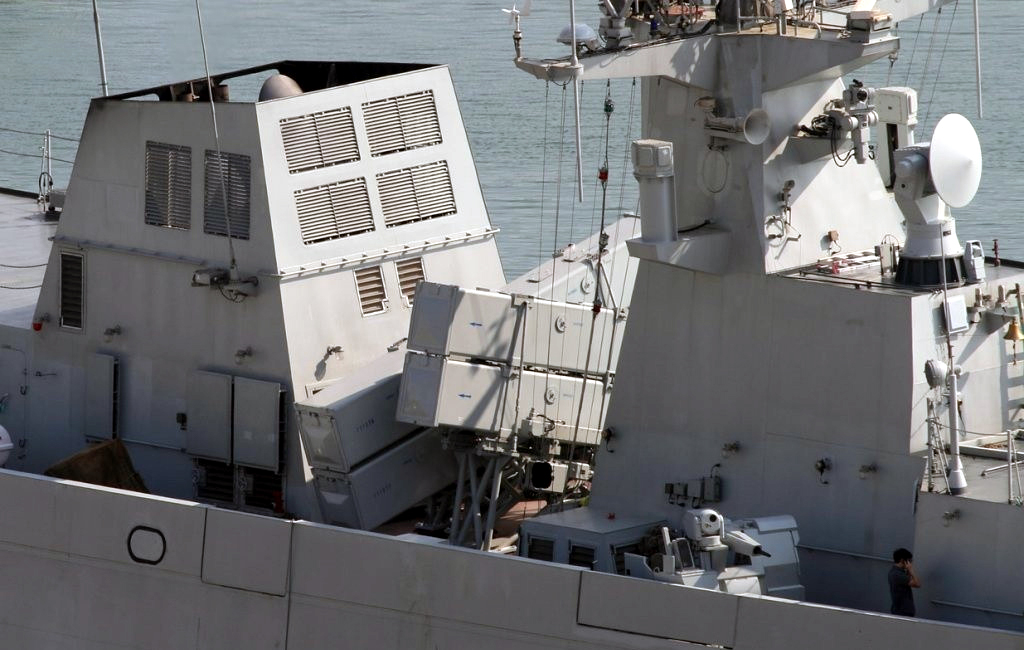
YJ-83 ASM launchers

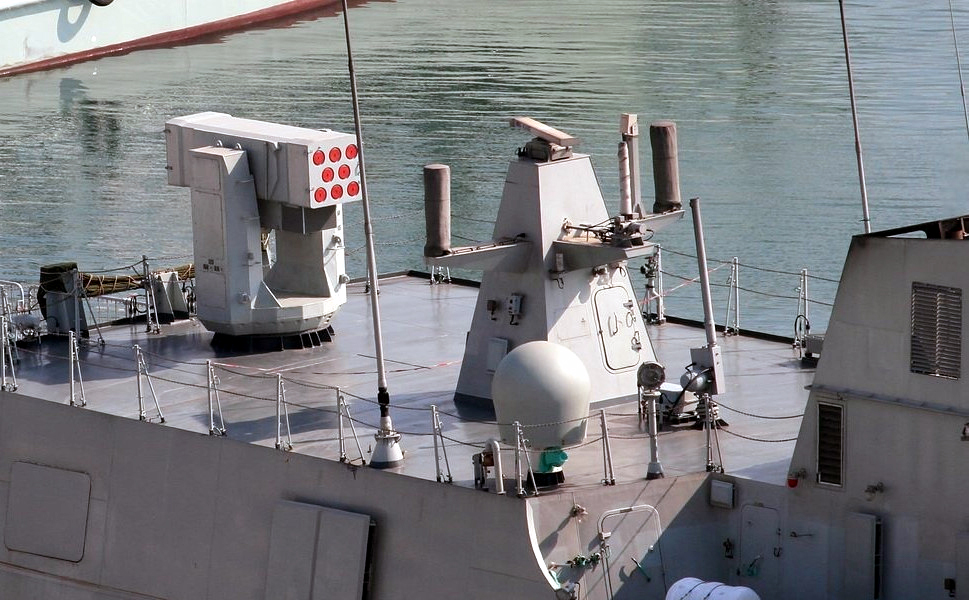
HHQ-10 SAM launcher

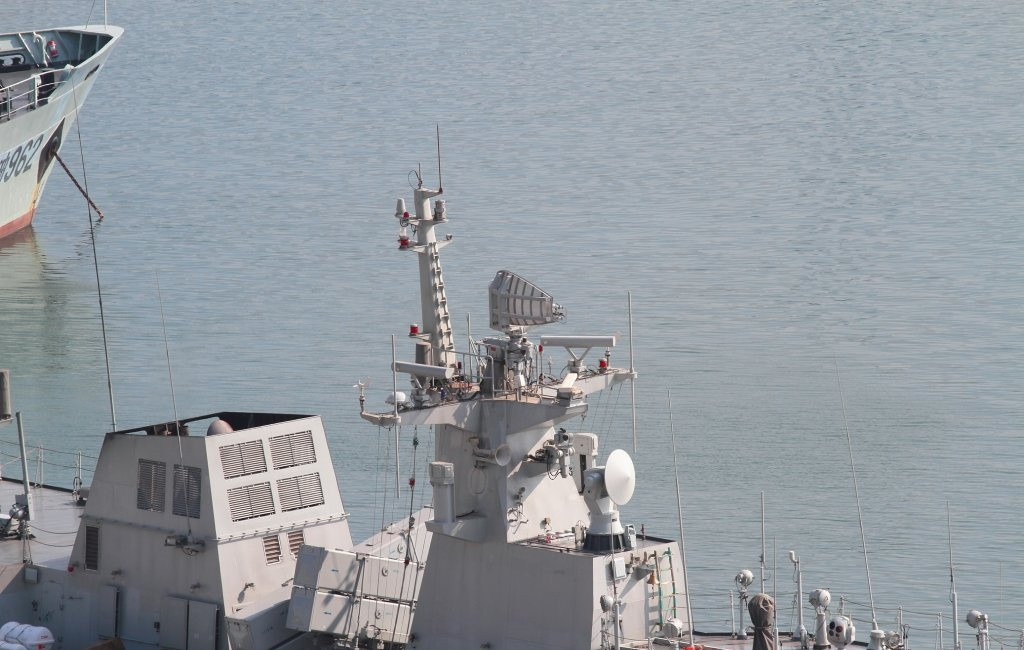
Type 360 radar

The Type 056 corvette fills the capability gap between the Type 022 missile boat and the Type 054A frigate. It is 90 m (300 ft) long with a gross displacement of 1500 tons, and incorporates anti-radar features. The Type 056 is suited for mid-range green-water missions and littoral duties, but not for major blue-water combat operations. The Type 056 corvette has a crew of 78 people with a top speed of 25 knots (46 km/h; 29 mph), and a cruise range of 3,500 nautical miles (6,500 km; 4,000 mi) at 16 knots (30 km/h; 18 mph).

Surface armament is reported as an H/PJ-26 76 mm (3.0 in) gun, two H/PJ-17 30 mm (1.2 in) autocannons, and four pod-launched YJ-83 anti-ship missiles (AShM). HHQ-10 (or FL-3000N in foreign-operated vessels) surface-to-air missiles (SAM) are carried in a single eight-cell launcher. Finally, there are two triple-tube 324 mm (12.8 in) torpedo launchers, which may carry Yu-7 light anti-submarine (ASW) torpedoes.

The 30 mm autocannons can also be used for a de-mining purpose.

The basic Type 056 is equipped with Type 347G (LR66) radar and bow-mounted sonar. The Type 056A adds towed array and variable depth sonars (VDS); the towed body suggests the VDS is "not an exact copy" of either the Italian/US DE-1163 or the French DUBV-43. It is likely that the Chinese will have undertaken extensive trials and analysis of any imported equipment and built a nominally indigenous system using the knowledge gained.

The Type 056 has a helicopter deck for landing a Z-9-sized helicopter, but no hangar.

== Other operators ==
=== Algeria ===
The Algerian National Navy operates one of the F-15A corvette variant. El Moutassadi was ordered in 2020 and delivered in 2023. and arrived in Algeria in 2023. In 2024 Algeria announced plans to build Type 056s locally.

=== Bangladesh ===
The Bangladesh Navy operates four of the C13B corvette variant, called Shadhinota-class in service. The C13B is 90 metres (295 ft 3 in) long and displaces 1,330 tons. Armament includes a 76 mm gun, C-802 AShMs, and FL-3000N SAMs. The stern has a helicopter pad but no hangar. The first two ships have SR 60 radar, and the last two have a phased-array radar; none have ASW sensors or weapons. All were built by Wuchang Shipyard in Wuhan.

Shadhinota − the lead ship − and Prottoy were ordered in October 2012 and commissioned in 2016. Sangram and Prottasha were ordered in late-2015 and commissioned in 2020.

=== China Coast Guard ===
A Type 056 variant for the China Coast Guard was under construction at Huangpu in late 2014. The forward superstructure was moved back to make for a raised structure ahead of the bridge. Large davits were installed ahead of the flight deck on both sides of the ships. It is not expected to be armed with the 76 mm gun, missiles, or other weapon systems.

Between mid-2021 and January 2023, China also transferred all 22 of the original Type 056 variant to the China Coast Guard.

=== Nigeria ===
The Nigerian Navy operates two of the P18N offshore patrol vessel (OPV) variant. The P18N displaces 1,800 tons, is 95 m (311 ft 8 in) long, has an endurance of 20 days, a maximum speed of 21 knots (39 km/h; 24 mph) and a range of 3,000 nautical miles (5,600 km; 3,500 mi) at 14 knots (26 km/h; 16 mph). It has a crew of 75. Armament is reportedly a single NG-16-1 76 mm gun with a TR47 fire-control radar, two 30 mm guns, and two 20 mm (0.79 in) guns. The class has an Oil Support Recovery System to combat oil spills. Unlike the Type 056, the P18N has a helicopter hangar. Both were built at the Wuchang Shipyard.

Nigeria ordered the ships from CSOC in April 2012 for US$42 million each. Centenary − the lead ship − commissioned in February 2015. Unity commissioned in December 2016.

The final 50–70% of the work on Unity was originally expected to be completed at the Nigerian Naval Shipyard in Port Harcourt; CSOC was contracted to upgrade the shipyard. Unity was ultimately completed at Wuchang.

=== Cambodia ===
China has donated two Type 056 corvettes which are under construction.

== Ships of class ==
China Coast Guard

#	Pennant Number	Name	Namesake	Builder	Laid Down	Launched	Commissioned	Fleet	Current Status	Notes
Type 056										
1	582 (In navy service); 21616 (In Coast Guard Service)	蚌埠 / Bengbu (In navy service) 南澳 / Nan'ao (In Coast Guard Service)	Bengbu (In navy service) Nan'ao County (In Coast Guard Service)	Hudong-Zhonghua Shipbuilding	2010	23 May 2012	12 March 2013	East Sea Fleet (In Navy Service); Guangdong Provincial Coast Guard Bureau (In coast guard service)	Transferred to China Coast Guard	On January 3, 2024, Nan'ao intercepted cigarette smugglers, seizing a total of 100,000 smuggled cigarettes worth 14 Million RMB and arresting 7 suspects.
2	596	惠州 / Huizhou	Huizhou	Huangpu, Guangzhou	2010	3 June 2012	1 July 2013	Hong Kong Garrison	Transferred to China Coast Guard	
3	584	梅州 / Meizhou	Meizhou	Wuchang Shipyard	2010	31 July 2012	29 July 2013	South Sea Fleet	Transferred to China Coast Guard	
4	580	大同 / Datong	Datong	Liaonan Shipyard	2011	10 August 2012	18 May 2013	North Sea Fleet	Transferred to China Coast Guard	
5	583	上饶 / Shangrao	Shangrao	Hudong-Zhonghua	2011	19 August 2012	10 June 2013	East Sea Fleet	Transferred to China Coast Guard	
6	597	钦州 / Qinzhou	Qinzhou	Huangpu, Guangzhou	2011	30 August 2012	1 July 2013	Hong Kong Garrison	Transferred to China Coast Guard	
7	585	百色 / Baise	Baise	Wuchang Shipyard	2011	25 October 2012	19 October 2013	South Sea Fleet	Transferred to China Coast Guard	
8	581	营口 / Yingkou	Yingkou	Liaonan Shipyard	2011	18 November 2012	1 August 2013	North Sea Fleet	Transferred to China Coast Guard	
9	586	吉安 / Ji'an	Ji'an	Hudong-Zhonghua	2012	25 February 2013	8 January 2014	East Sea Fleet	Transferred to China Coast Guard	
10	587	揭阳 / Jieyang	Jieyang	Huangpu, Guangzhou	2012	26 January 2013	26 January 2014	East Sea Fleet	Transferred to China Coast Guard	
11	588	泉州 / Quanzhou	Quanzhou	Hudong-Zhonghua	2012	25 June 2013	8 August 2014	East Sea Fleet	Transferred to China Coast Guard	
12	589	清远 / Qingyuan	Qingyuan	Huangpu, Guangzhou	2012	30 May 2013	11 June 2014	South Sea Fleet	Transferred to China Coast Guard	
13	590 (In navy service) 4103 (In coast guard service)	威海 / Weihai (in Navy service) 飞鱼 / Feiyu (in Coast Guard Service)	Weihai (in navy service) Flying fish (in Coast Guard service)	Liaonan Shipyard	2012	1 August 2013	15 March 2014	North Sea Fleet(in navy service); 4th Bureau of the China Coast Guard (in Coast Guard Service)	Transferred to China Coast Guard in 2021	Rammed and water cannoned BFAR vessel BRP Datu Sunday on August 25, 2024; two dents were visible
14	591	抚顺 / Fushun	Fushun	Liaonan Shipyard	2012	1 August 2013	12 July 2014	North Sea Fleet	Transferred to China Coast Guard	
15	592	泸州 / Luzhou	Luzhou	Wuchang Shipyard	2012	16 July 2013	7 June 2014	South Sea Fleet	Transferred to China Coast Guard	
16	595	潮州 / Chaozhou	Chaozhou	Wuchang Shipyard	2012	14 November 2013	28 November 2014	East Sea Fleet	Transferred to China Coast Guard	
17	501	信阳 / Xinyang	Xinyang		2013		March 2015	North Sea Fleet	Transferred to China Coast Guard	All crew of the ship were made honorary citizens of Xinyang in December 2017. During the COVID-19 pandemic, the crew of Xinyang raised 10600 RMB to assist virus control in Xinyang.
18	503	宿州 / Suzhou	Suzhou	Wuchang Shipyard	2013	17 May 2014	11 February 2015	East Sea Fleet	Transferred to China Coast Guard	
19	509	淮安 / Huai’an	Huai‘an	Hudong-Zhonghua	2014	15 August 2015	11 August 2016	East Sea Fleet	Transferred to China Coast Guard	
20	510	宁德 / Ningde	Ningde	Huangpu, Guangzhou	2014	24 October 2015	28 December 2016	East Sea Fleet	Transferred to China Coast Guard	
21	511 (In navy service); 1108 (In coast guard service)	保定 / Baoding (In navy service) 海警1108 / Haijing 1108	Baoding	Wuchang Shipyard	2014	22 October 2015	12 December 2016	East Sea Fleet (In navy service); 1st Bureau of the China Coast Guard (In coast guard service)	Transferred to China Coast Guard	
22	512	菏泽 / Heze	Heze	Liaonan Shipyard	2014	7 July 2015	12 December 2016	East Sea Fleet	Transferred to China Coast Guard	

People's Liberation Army Navy

#	Pennant Number	Name	Namesake	Builder	Laid Down	Launched	Commissioned	Fleet	Status
Type 056A
23	638 (ex 593)	三门峡 / Sanmenxia	Sanmenxia	Hudong-Zhonghua	2012	30 November 2013	13 November 2014	East Sea Fleet	Active
24	639 (ex 594)	株洲 / Zhuzhou	Zhuzhou	Huangpu, Guangzhou	2012	30 November 2013	28 November 2014	East Sea Fleet	Active
25	655 (ex 502)	黄石 / Huangshi	Huangshi	Hudong-Zhonghua	2013	16 May 2014	6 May 2015	North Sea Fleet	Active
26	666 (ex 504)	宿迁 / Suqian	Suqian	Huangpu, Guangzhou	2013	29 June 2014	20 July 2015	South Sea Fleet	Active
27	656 (ex 505)	秦皇岛 / Qinhuangdao	Qinhuangdao	Hudong-Zhonghua	2013	11 October 2014	16 October 2015	North Sea Fleet	Active
28	667 (ex 506)	荆门 / Jingmen	Jingmen	Huangpu, Guangzhou	2014	25 December 2014	25 January 2016	South Sea Fleet	Active
29	664 (ex 507)	铜仁 / Tongren	Tongren	Hudong-Zhonghua	2014	19 March 2015	20 February 2016	East Sea Fleet	Active
30	668 (ex 508)	曲靖 / Qujing	Qujing	Huangpu, Guangzhou	2014	16 July 2015	8 June 2016	South Sea Fleet	Active
31	640 (ex 513)	鄂州 / Ezhou	Ezhou	Hudong-Zhonghua	2014	25 December 2015	18 January 2017	East Sea Fleet	Active
32	669 (ex 514)	六盘水 / Liupanshui	Liupanshui	Huangpu, Guangzhou	2015	31 March 2016	31 May 2017	South Sea Fleet	Active
33	641 (ex 518)	义乌 / Yiwu	Yiwu	Hudong-Zhonghua	2015	20 May 2016	21 July 2017	East Sea Fleet	Active
34	648 (ex 520)	汉中 / Hanzhong	Hanzhong	Huangpu, Guangzhou	2015	22 July 2016	11 July 2017	South Sea Fleet	Active
35	645 (ex 535)	宣城 / Xuancheng	Xuancheng	Wuchang Shipyard	2015	19 August 2016	25 September 2017	East Sea Fleet	Active
36	643 (ex 556)	宜春 / Yichun	Yichun	Hudong-Zhonghua	2015	7 September 2016	16 October 2017	East Sea Fleet	Active
37	650 (ex 540)	乌海 / Wuhai	Wuhai	Liaonan Shipyard	2015	14 September 2016	15 January 2018	North Sea Fleet	Active
38	646 (ex 551)	遂宁 / Suining	Suining	Wuchang Shipyard	2015	3 October 2016	28 November 2017	South Sea Fleet	Active
39	649 (ex 552)	广元 / Guangyuan	Guangyuan	Huangpu, Guangzhou	2015	28 October 2016	16 November 2017	South Sea Fleet	Active
40	642 (ex 554)	德阳 / Deyang	Deyang	Hudong-Zhonghua	2015	29 December 2016	19 January 2018	East Sea Fleet	Active
41	654 (ex 541)	张掖 / Zhangye	Zhangye	Liaonan Shipyard	2015	7 December 2016	March 2018	North Sea Fleet	Active
42	647 (ex 557)	南充 / Nanchong	Nanchong	Wuchang Shipyard	2016	2 February 2017	1 June 2018	South Sea Fleet	Active
43	610	朔州 / Shuozhou	Shuozhou	Hudong-Zhonghua	2016	26 July 2017	10 December 2019	East Sea Fleet	Active
44	608	聊城 / Liaocheng	Liaocheng	Hudong-Zhonghua	2017	21 December 2017	19 January 2020	East Sea Fleet	Active
45	625	巴中 / Bazhong	Bazhong	Huangpu, Guangzhou	2017	2 March 2018	5 November 2019	South Sea Fleet	Active
46	611	六安 / Lu'an	Lu'an	Hudong-Zhonghua	2017	17 March 2018	18 January 2020	East Sea Fleet	Active
47	603	定州 / Dingzhou	Dingzhou	Liaonan Shipyard	2017	29 April 2018	2020	North Sea Fleet	Active
48	604	牡丹江 / Mudanjiang	Mudanjiang	Liaonan Shipyard	2017	29 April 2018	May 2020	North Sea Fleet	Active
49	615	孝感 / Xiaogan	Xiaogan	Hudong-Zhonghua	2017	16 May 2018	March 2020	East Sea Fleet	Active
50	626	梧州 / Wuzhou	Wuzhou	Huangpu, Guangzhou	2017	8 August 2018	29 December 2019	South Sea Fleet	Active
51	622	广安 / Guang'an	Guang'an	Wuchang Shipyard	2017	August 2018	31 December 2019	South Sea Fleet	Active
52	621	攀枝花 / Panzhihua	Panzhihua	Wuchang Shipyard	2017	27 August 2018	10 January 2020	South Sea Fleet	Active
53	617	景德镇 / Jingdezhen	Jingdezhen	Hudong-Zhonghua	2018	12 September 2018	17 June 2020	East Sea Fleet	Active
54	623	文山 / Wenshan	Wenshan	Huangpu, Guangzhou	2018	11 December 2018	31 December 2019	South Sea Fleet	Active
55	605	张家口 / Zhanhjiakou	Zhangjiakou	Liaonan Shipyard	2018	15 January 2019	April 2020	North Sea Fleet	Active
56	606	辛集 / Xinji	Xinji	Liaonan Shipyard	2018	15 January 2019	2020	North Sea Fleet	Active
57	627	恩施 / Enshi	Enshi	Huangpu, Guangzhou	2018	7 March 2019	April 2020	South Sea Fleet	Active
58	620	赣州 / Ganzhou	Ganzhou	Wuchang Shipyard	2018	11 January 2019	10 January 2020	South Sea Fleet	Active
59	616	泰安 / Tai'an	Tai'an	Hudong-Zhonghua	2018	19 March 2019	August 2020	East Sea Fleet	Active
60	628	永州 / Yongzhou	Yongzhou	Huangpu, Guangzhou	2018	9 May 2019	January 2020	South Sea Fleet	Active
61	618	商丘 / Shangqiu	Shangqiu	Hudong-Zhonghua	2018	5 July 2019	February 2021	East Sea Fleet	Active
62	624	随州 / Suizhou	Suizhou	Huangpu, Guangzhou	2019	15 July 2019	2020	South Sea Fleet	Active
63	637	十堰 / Shiyan	Shiyan	Hudong-Zhonghua	2019	21 August 2019	4 February 2021	East Sea Fleet	Active
64	600	松原 / Songyuan	Songyuan	Liaonan Shipyard	2019	17 September 2019	28 October 2020	North Sea Fleet	Active
65	602	平顶山 / Pingdingshan	Pingdingshan	Liaonan Shipyard	2019	17 September 2019	28 October 2020	North Sea Fleet	Active
66	607	东营 / Dongying	Dongying	Huangpu, Guangzhou	2019	17 October 2019	January 2021	North Sea Fleet	Active
67	636	济宁 / Jining	Jining	Wuchang Shipyard	2019	8 November 2019	2021	East Sea Fleet	Active
68	631	天门 / Tianmen	Tianmen	Wuchang Shipyard	2019	14 November 2019	January 2021	South Sea Fleet	Active
69	629	铜陵 / Tongling	Tongling	Huangpu, Guangzhou	2019	November 2019	January 2021	South Sea Fleet	Active
70	609	石嘴山 / Shizuishan	Shizuishan	Hudong-Zhonghua	2019	25 December 2019	January 2021	East Sea Fleet	Active
71	619	南阳 / Nanyang	Nanyang	Wuchang Shipyard	2019	December 2019	30 January 2021	East Sea Fleet	Active
72	630	阿坝 / Aba	Aba	Huangpu, Guangzhou	2019	30 December 2019	January 2021	South Sea Fleet	Active

Bangladesh Navy

Pennant Number	Name	Builder	Launched	Commissioned	Status
C13B
F111	Shadhinota	Wuchang	30 November 2014	19 March 2016	Active
F112	Prottoy	Wuchang	30 December 2014	19 March 2016	Active
F113	Sangram	Wuchang	February 2018	18 June 2020	Active
F114	Prottasha	Wuchang	8 April 2018	5 November 2020	Active

Nigerian Navy

Pennant Number	Name	Builder	Launched	Commissioned	Status
P18N
F91	Centenary	Wuchang	January 2014	February 2015	Active
F92	Unity	Wuchang	29 November 2014	15 December 2016	Active

Algerian National Navy

Pennant Number	Name	Builder	Launched	Commissioned	Status
F-15A
940	El Moutassadi	Hudong-Zhonghua Shipbuilding Group		2023	Active

== See also ==
=== Ships of comparable role, configuration, and era ===
- Bung Tomo-class corvette
- Buyan-class corvette
- Diponegoro-class corvette
- Freedom-class littoral combat ship
- Independence-class littoral combat ship
- Kora-class corvette
- Project 22160 patrol ship
- Sa'ar 5-class corvette

=== Related lists ===
- List of active People's Liberation Army Navy ships

== Sources ==
- The International Institute for Strategic Studies (13 February 2024). The Military Balance 2024. London: Routledge. ISBN 978-1-032-78004-7.
