= Lumut Port =

Port in Perak, Malaysia

- Interactive map of Lumut Port

Location
- Country: Malaysia
- Location: Kampung Acheh, Lumut, Perak
- Coordinates: 4.2333°N 100.6333°E

Details
- Opened: 24 July 1995; 30 years ago
- Operated by: Lumut Maritime Terminal Sdn Bhd
- Type of harbour: Seaport

Statistics
- Website lumutport.com

Lumut Port (Malay: Pelabuhan Lumut) is a seaport at Kampung Acheh, Lumut, in Perak, on the Straits of Malacca coast of Peninsular Malaysia. It is owned and operated by Lumut Maritime Terminal Sdn Bhd and was officiated on 24 July 1995.

== Operations ==
In 2002 the port began operating and managing the Lekir Bulk Terminal, a deep-water bulk terminal with a natural depth of 20 metres. An adjacent industrial park provides land for warehousing and transhipment.

== Development ==
In March 2024 the Perak state government launched the Lumut Maritime Terminal 2 (LMT2) project, an expansion of the port, with about RM282 million allocated to its development. The port forms part of the planned Lumut Maritime Industrial City; in 2025 the Perak State Development Corporation and Port of Antwerp-Bruges International announced a partnership to develop it as a maritime industrial hub.

== Cargo ==
The port handles break bulk, dry bulk (such as limestone and coal), and liquid bulk cargo, as well as project cargo.
