= TY-90 =

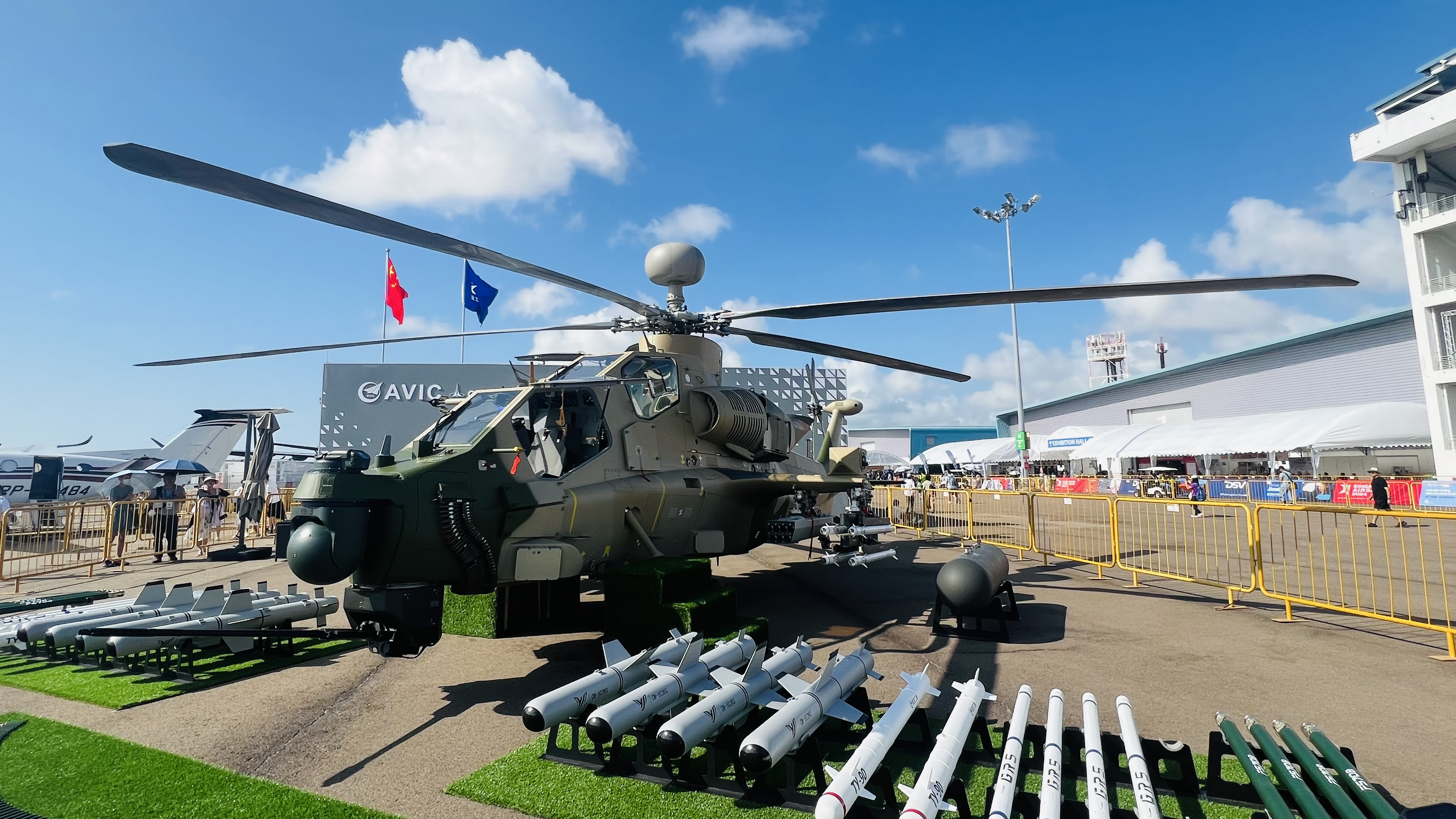
- TY-90 mock-ups (bottom-center) displayed in front a Changhe Z-10 helicopter
- Type: Air-to-air & surface-to-air missiles
- Place of origin: China

Service history
- In service: 1990’s – present
- Used by: China

Production history
- Manufacturer: China Aviation Industry Corporation I
- Produced: since 1990s

Specifications
- Mass: 25 kg
- Length: 1.95 meter
- Diameter: 90 mm
- Wingspan: 216 mm
- Warhead: 3 kg warhead
- Detonation mechanism: impact / proximity
- Engine: Solid-fuel rocket motor
- Propellant: Solid fuel
- Operational range: 0.5 – 8 km
- Flight ceiling: 6 km
- Flight altitude: 0 – 6 km
- Maximum speed: > Mach 2
- Guidance system: ImIR IR
- Launch platform: Air & surface

TY-90 or AKK-90 (Chinese: 天燕-90; pinyin: Tiān Yàn-90; lit. 'Sky Swallow-90'; NATO reporting name: CH-SA-13) is a Chinese air-to-air missile specifically developed for attack helicopter dogfights in the late 1990s. Contrary to erroneous claims, the missile is not developed from MANPADS missiles, but instead, it is specifically designed as an air-to-air missile to engage in helicopter combat.

== Design and development ==
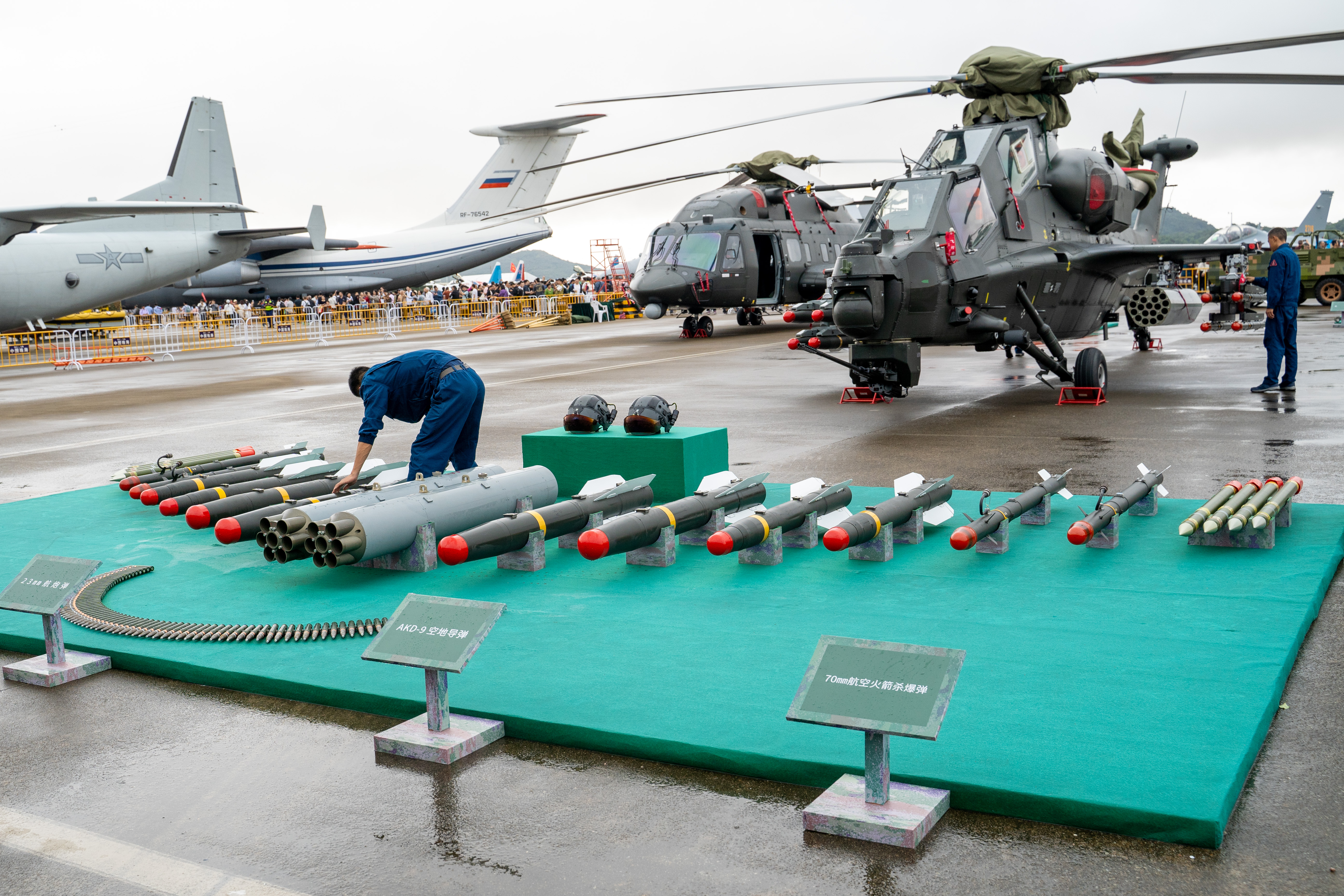
TY-90 (right-center) missiles showcased at Zhuhai Airshow 2024

The Chinese determined that the MANPAD missiles converted for helicopter dogfights were not adequate, so a brand-new air-to-air missile specifically for helicopter use was sanctioned, and TY-90 was the resulting product. The 3 kg (6.6 lb) warhead of the missile is specially designed to sever the rotary wings with a single shot, and the missile has all-aspect attack capability. The missile is designed to ensure a single shot would be sufficient to down an opposing attack helicopter or at least knock it out of action.

At least three additional versions have been developed in addition to the basic version, two of them being air-to-air versions. The first adopts a dual-band guidance, adding UV to the original IR, while the second adopts an Imaging IR (ImIR) guidance. During the 5th Zhuhai Airshow held at the end of 2004, a ground-launched air defense version appeared, with the designation of DY-90, which was essentially the original TY-90, but with an additional option of incorporating a rocket booster to increase range upon the customer's request.

A naval surface-to-air version is also developed, utilizing the FLS-1 system and the basic version with IR guidance, thus providing a fire-and-forget capability in comparison to the case where QW-3 is used. However, this naval version has not entered service as of 2008, and the reason is reported to be that the Chinese military wants to wait until the more advanced dual-band or ImIR version can be incorporated into the FLS-1 system, which was under development. However, at Zhuhai Airshow, AVIC I, the developer of TY-90 only acknowledged the development and active marketing of such systems, but refused to further confirm whether the Chinese military or any foreign customers had placed any orders, and neither did the developer confirm such developmental works were privately funded by the developer or received any funds from the state or foreign customers.

== Variants ==
=== SG-II ADS ===
In 2004, a land-based air defense variant of TY-90 was revealed to the Chinese public after entering Chinese service in small numbers for some time. Shengong (Deity Bow, 神弓)-II Air Defense System (SG-II ADS) is the upgrade of its predecessor SG ADS, with a quadruple TY-90/DY-90 missile launcher replacing the original Type 80 23mm AAA gun in its predecessor, resulting in the new SG-II ADS. Like its predecessor, SG-II ADS is also a towed system and uses all other subsystems of its predecessor, with the exception of the gun. Because TY/DY-90 is a fire-and-forget weapon, no modification is needed for the fire control system of the original SG ADS.

=== Hunter air defense system ===
During the 5th Zhuhai Airshow held at the end of 2004, a mobile land-based air defense variant of TY-90 was revealed, dubbed as LS ADS, short for Lie-Shou (猎手, meaning Hunter) Air Defense System. Eight TY-90 in two groups of four are mounted in the back of a Dongfeng EQ2050, and the fire control system consists of electro-optics, including laser, IR & TV, mounted between the two quadruple launchers.

The LS ADS is developed by Norinco, with Dongfeng Motor Corporation as the subcontractor to develop the chassis (vehicle). LS ADS is capable of being air transported, including being slung under helicopters. The system is operated by a team of two, one driver and one weaponry system officer. The system can also be integrated into a larger air defense network. A small number subsequently entered PLA service for evaluation purposes.

=== Type 92 Yitian ===
The TY-90 has been mounted on the WZ-551 armored personnel carrier as an air defense vehicle for mechanized forces. In 2005, this mobile land-based air defense system was revealed to the Chinese public, called Yi-Tian (Chinese: 倚天) Air Defense System, or YT ADS. The weaponry includes eight TY-90 missiles, QJC-88 12.7 mm heavy machine gun, and 2 sets of 4 smoke grenade dischargers. WZ-551 is the chassis of the Yi-Tian air defense system, giving the system amphibious capability and added protection. Additionally, a light solid-state 3-D passive phased array radar is added to the fire control system, just above the original electro-optical fire control system, providing the ADS with a greater surveillance range. The radar can be folded down for traveling and transportation. Yi-Tian system was modified and improved upon customer request, and renamed to Tianlong 6 (Sky Dragon 6) SHORAD missile weapon system. Laotian army signed the contract with China in 2010, becoming the first customer of the Tianlong 6 system.

Specifications:

- Maximum target altitude: 4 km
- Minimum target altitude: 15 meter
- Maximum target range: 6 km
- Minimum target range: 300 meter
- Maximum target speed: > 400 meter / second
- Maximum radar searching range: >20 km
- Maximum radar tracking range: 10 – 12 km
- System reaction time: 6 – 8 seconds

=== Yitian-L ===
The Yitian-L is a short-range air defense system consisting of 4 TY-90 missiles and an X-band 3D search radar mast mounted on a 4x4 Dongfeng tactical vehicle chassis. Yitian-L's TY-90 missile has the same range of 6 km (3.7 mi), but the radar has a detection range of 18 km (11 mi). Aside from Mengshi, the Yitian-L missile system can also be mounted on other high mobility chassis such as the Yema 4x4.

In 2026, the Yitian-L system is upgraded with a new launcher arrangement, allowing a single Dongfeng Mengshi vehicle to carry 12 missiles.

=== SWS-2 ===
The SWS-2 is a SHORAD gun/missile system, based on the chassis of VN-1. It is armed with a 35 mm revolver cannon and four TY-90 surface-to-air missiles. The system was marketed by China in 2016.

== Operational history ==
=== Democratic Republic of the Congo ===
Rwandan Defence Force (RDF) and its backed rebel group, the March 23 Movement, used WZ-551-based Type 92 Yitian system in the Democratic Republic of the Congo. In 2025, the rebels used WZ-551 air-defence vehicles to shoot down Armed Forces of the Democratic Republic of the Congo (FARDC) aircraft in eastern Democratic Republic of the Congo (DRC). During the 2025 Goma offensive, it was reported that Chinese CH-4 and Turkish Bayraktar TB2 drones operated by the FARDC were shot down, contributing to a sharp reduction in government air sorties over North and South Kivu.

== Operators ==
China

- People's Liberation Army Ground Force

Laos

- Laotian Army (Type 92 Yitian/Tianlong-6)

Mali

- Malian Armed Forces (Yitian-L)

Mauritania

- Mauritanian Army (Yitian-L)

Pakistan

- Pakistan Army (TY-90)

Rwanda

- Rwandan Defence Force (Type 92 Yitian/Tianlong-6)

=== Non-state actors ===
Wa State

- United Wa State Army

March 23 Movement (M23)

== Specifications (TY-90) ==
For air-to-air version:

- length: 1.9 meter
- diameter: 0.09 metre
- weight: 20 kg
- warhead: 3 kg
- Maximum g-force: 20 g
- guidance: infrared homing
- fuze: laser proximity / contact
- speed: > Mach 2
- minimum range: 0.5 km
- maximum range: 8 km
- minimum altitude: 0 meter
- maximum altitude: 6 km
- single-shot kill probability: > 80%
- developer: China Aviation Industry Corporation I

== See also ==
- WZ-551
- Changhe Z-10
