= Wuchang Shipbuilding Industry Group =

Chinese shipbuilding company

General information
- Coordinates: 30.587204°N 114.673033°E

Wuchang Shipbuilding Industry Group (WS), commonly called Wuchang Shipyard or Wuhan Shipyard, is a major state-owned in-land shipyard in Wuchang, Wuhan, China. It was founded in 1934. It is part of the China Shipbuilding Industry Corporation.

The shipyard designs, builds, and repairs civil and military vessels and constructs other structures such as a satellite launching pad, a heavy oil catalytic cracking unit, shiplifters, hydropower stations, and bridges. It is authorized to import and export products. Located on an area of about 6 million square meters adjacent to the Yangtze river, WS has about 11,000 employees. Its six product divisions are military industry and trade, civil vessels, bridge equipment, oceanographic engineering equipment, and complete plant and steel structures.

WS is an important factory producing submarines for the Chinese Navy. In July 2024, satellite pictures showed floating cranes at the location where WS had been docking a submarine under construction of the new nuclear-powered Zhou-class leading to speculation that the submarine had sunk.
