= List of Ministry of Defence Police locations =

Ministry of Defence Police locations and units include:

== Force Headquarters ==
RAF Wyton

=== ICOS - Intelligence, Crime & Operational Support ===
- ICOS officers are controlled centrally from Wyton and are located in regional offices based at Catterick, Faslane and Wyton.
- Intelligence Support Officers may be forward deployed to support local stations or operations.
- Operational Support Unit North RAF Menwith Hill
- Operational Support Unit South RAF Wyton

=== Mobile Support Units ===
- Central Support Group Aldershot
- Central Support Group Bicester
- Nuclear Guard Force—assembled from officers nationwide once activated by NARO and deployed to a specific incident.

== Stations ==
=== Region 1 – Scotland (Central) ===
- Clyde
- Coulport

=== Region 2 – England (North West) ===
- Barrow-in-Furness

=== Region 3 – England (North East) ===
- Fylingdales
- Menwith Hill

=== Region 4 – England (Central West) ===
- Raynesway (Derby)
- Hereford

=== Region 5 – England (Central East) ===
- Alconbury
- Croughton
- Lakenheath/Mildenhall

=== Region 6 – London ===
- Whitehall

=== Region 7 – England (Central South) ===
- Aldermaston
- Burghfield
- Special Escort Group (Based at AWE)

=== Region 8 – England (South East) ===
- Oakhanger
- Porton Down
- Portsmouth

=== Region 9 – England (South West) ===
- Corsham
- Devonport
- Fairford
- Welford
