= Special Escort Group (Ministry of Defence Police) =

British unit transporting nuclear material

- Active: 1991 – present
- Country: United Kingdom
- Branch: AWE Division
- Type: Domestic Law Enforcement, Paramilitary
- Role: Defence Nuclear Material Transport Operations, Counter Terrorism and Law Enforcement
- Part of: Ministry of Defence Police
- Nickname(s): SEG

The Special Escort Group (Ministry of Defence Police) or SEG (MDP) are a specialised unit of the Ministry of Defence Police. It is primarily responsible for the movement of all nuclear weapons and Defence Special Nuclear Material within the United Kingdom.

== Role ==
The SEG conduct nuclear weapons convoys, by road, between AWE Burghfield and RNAD Coulport, and special nuclear materials by road, rail, and air. Special nuclear materials within the UK are defined as: tritium, enriched uranium and depleted uranium and plutonium, as well as new and used reactor fuel from Royal Navy submarines.

The SEG provides the staff for the close escort and traffic management of nuclear weapons convoy movements. During these convoy movements it works alongside military personnel from Fleet Protection Group Royal Marines and Atomic Weapons Establishment civilian staff. Rail escorts include radiological safety escorts with railway personnel. There is liaison with local police forces whilst the convoy is en route. Nuclear weapon convoys are regularly monitored by the nuclear disarmament campaigning network NukeWatch UK and convoys have, on occasion, been disrupted by anti-nuclear weapon protesters.

The SEG may escort other Ministry of Defence assets, and has escorted U.S. munitions (such as during Operation Telic). It also provides specialist support, to other units of the Ministry of Defence Police and elsewhere; such as ceremonial duties during the visit of the Queen to HMNB Portsmouth for Trafalgar 200.

== Location ==
The SEG is based at AWE Aldermaston near Reading, Berkshire. Training there includes emergency procedures and tactical firearms support. Exercise scenarios include counter terrorism exercises, anti-nuclear protest tactics and convoy armed security.

== Nuclear accidents ==
In the event of a nuclear accident, responsibility for coordinating a response falls to the Nuclear Accident Response Organisation (NEO), part of the Ministry of Defence. An Immediate Response Force would be embedded within the convoy, or in the case of air transport be ready to fly by helicopter to the scene. Each is commanded by an MoD Incident Co-ordinator. Within 24 hours a Follow on Force can be deployed if required. The Ministry of Defence Police would co-ordinate a joint response with the United States for accidents involving U.S. nuclear warheads or nuclear materials within the United Kingdom.

Detailed public emergency plans are drawn from the Local Authority & Emergency Services Information (LAESI) plans.

== See also ==
- Ministry of Defence Police and Guarding Agency
