= Defence Nuclear Material Transport Operations =

Defence Nuclear Material Transport Operations is the movement of military Defence Nuclear Materials (DNM) within, to and from the United Kingdom. Defence Nuclear Material Transport Operations are also known as DNM Transportation; Defence Nuclear Material in transit; Nuclear movements; and DNM movements.

The Special Escort Group of the Ministry of Defence Police, SEG (MDP), escort the nuclear materials and remain on standby during their transit. Immediate Response Forces (IRF) are embedded within the road and rail transports, and on standby with air transports.

Defence Nuclear Materials are moved using the following transport means:

- Trident nuclear weapons, special nuclear material (SNM) and new submarine reactor fuel are transported by road.
- Used reactor fuel from Royal Navy submarines is transported by rail (and may involve a short road journey to the railhead).
- Special nuclear material is also moved by air, as are US nuclear weapons.

== Categories ==
=== Nuclear weapon transport by road ===
Trident NWs are contained within PD AWG 516 packages. These are kept on Load Transfer Platform Trolleys (LTPT) until moved by crane or put onto Truck Cargo Heavy Duty (TCHD) carriers. Hence these transport operations are often referred to as TCHD Convoys.

The Mark I TCHDs were AEC Mammoth Majors. The Mark II TCHD carriers were 7-axle articulated lorries, the four-axle tractors for which were built by Foden. These vehicles have cargo bodies designed to provide extra protection to the nuclear weapon containers. The Mark III vehicle introduced in 2011, which replaced the Foden towing a similar three-axle trailer, is a similarly capable four-axle tractor based on a highly modified Mercedes-Benz Actros, which has its Mercedes-Benz logo removed.

The primary logistical movement of nuclear weapons is from the Atomic Weapons Establishment (AWE) in Berkshire, England, to the Royal Naval Armaments Depot RNAD Coulport in Argyll, Scotland (part of HMNB Clyde). Because the warheads need to be constantly refurbished, batches are shuttled by road convoy several times a year. Convoys use Staging Posts (SP) and Crew Change Locations (CCL) during this journey.

The TCHDs containing the weapons are escorted in a convoy of MoD vehicles commanded by a Ministry of Defence (MDP) Chief Inspector. A crew of up to 50 people include a first aid team, fire crew and personnel equipped to monitor for radiological hazards. The convoy maintains contact by radio and telephone with Task Control, MDP Central Information Room, Wethersfield, Essex, which monitors its movement, and with the civil police force through whose area it is passing.

Police forces are notified at least 24 hours in advance of a convoy being routed through their area; this enables them to advise the convoy about any local traffic problems. Police forces may advise fire brigades of the presence of the convoy if it is moving into the vicinity of a fire brigade operation.

Three organisations are involved in the convoy: Fleet Protection Group Royal Marines, AWE civilian personnel and the Special Escort Group.

Convoy vehicles include:-

- The Stand Off Escort – Royal Marines provide armed military personnel to counter any potential threat and the SEG’s role is the close escort (security) and traffic management throughout any convoy move.
- The Escort Commander's vehicle leads the convoy, navigating the routes and managing the timings by constantly being kept informed of traffic situations up ahead.
- The TCHDs, or Truck, Cargo, Heavy Duty vehicles which carry the nuclear weapons. There are up to five in a convoy. Each AWE driver is accompanied by an armed SEG officer as close escort.
- Fire Tender, with staff employed by AWE – the Convoy Safety Officer & Fire Crew
- Convoy Commander’s Vehicle, manned by MDP Chief Inspector and his team.
- The Traffic Car with two SEG police officers keep traffic behind by putting on a 'rolling block' whenever there is a traffic build up ahead or the convoy approaches hazards such as roundabouts or junctions.
- Two miles behind the main part of the Convoy there is a Support Element that includes a Convoy Support vehicle, a recovery vehicle and a coach. The AWE provides a Deputy Convoy Safety Officer who is responsible for this element.

Many details on NW convoys are kept secret by the Government and MoD who operate a Neither Confirm Nor Deny (NCND) policy on informing the public regarding NW convoys. Evidence given by the Nuclear Information Campaign to the Defence Select Committee (based on figures from campaign group Nukewatch UK for 2000 to 2006) give the number of convoys as ranging from two to six return journeys per year from Aldermaston to Coulport. Estimates of the warhead numbers transported during this period are that 88 were moved from Aldermaston to Coulport while 120 were returned, indicating a withdrawal of between 30 and 50 warheads leaving an operational stockpile of between 150 and 170 warheads.

The convoy is tracked by the Task Control, MOD Police (MDP) Central Information Room in Wethersfield, Essex and the Special Safety Cell (SSC) in Ensleigh, Bath. In the event of a nuclear accident the SSC would activate the MoD’s Nuclear Accident Response Organisation (NARO) and would alert the local police constabulary immediately.

The responsibility for these operations rests with the Director Nuclear Movements & Nuclear Accident Response Group (D NM&NARG). All mission critical support vehicles involved in the NW transport operation are owned by D NM&NARG. The vehicles were purchased by the MOD for use in their then current role from the Royal Air Force (RAF) Nuclear Weapon Convoy Group and transferred to D NM&NARG en bloc in 2002. Prior to 2002 the RAF were in commanding roles during NW convoys.

Protesters regularly try to stop the convoys and climb onto the TCHDs. The MDP are trained on a regular basis to counter any protest. MDP motorcyclists and traffic car officers make arrests and then hand over responsibility to the local Police Force. For 22 years AWPC (Aldermaston Women’s Peace Campaign) have held a monthly camp outside the fence at AWE Aldermaston. Nukewatch UK tracks convoys and has provided evidence for the House of Commons Defence Select Committee (evidence from Nuclear Information Service)

=== Special nuclear material (SNM) transport by road ===
SNM is transported in the UK both by road and by air overseas. When transported by road it is moved in High Security Vehicles (HSV) escorted in a convoy of MoD vehicles commanded by an MDP Inspector. The convoy is made up of a crew of up to 30 which includes personnel in case of accident and the monitoring of radiological hazards.

The MDP started working with the SNM convoys in 1978, and their purpose was to escort the MOD’s Special Nuclear Materials around the United Kingdom, most of this work being to and from the Atomic Weapons Establishment at Aldermaston.

=== New reactor fuel transport by road ===
Reactor fuel for nuclear-powered submarines is manufactured at Rolls-Royce in Derby. It is transported by road to Devonport Dockyard for installation into submarines undergoing refit. In addition new reactor cores are transported to BAE Systems at Barrow-in-Furness for installation into new build submarines and very infrequently to the Vulcan Naval Reactor Test Establishment (NRTE) at Dounreay, in the north of Scotland.

New fuel is transported in the form of separate modular units that are individually packaged into protective containers known as New Module Containers (NMC). The NMCs are loaded onto standard road transport vehicles that travel in convoy. These movements are escorted by the Ministry of Defence Police Special Escort Group (MDP SEG), and specialists travelling in separate vehicles provide technical support in key areas such as radiation monitoring. The convoy crew consists of over 20 personnel. The civil police are given at least 24 hours notice prior to the move and are contacted by the convoy commander when the convoy enters and leaves their respective areas of responsibility. The Fire Services are informed by local agreement.

=== Nuclear weapon and SNM transport by air ===
UK nuclear weapons are moved by road, but movements of US nuclear weapons are conducted by air. The RAF maintains response teams at a number of bases along the flight route which are brought to immediate readiness during the transit of the aircraft through their area. The Special Safety Cell (SSC) at Ensleigh in Bath is staffed throughout the flight. Only multi-engined military transport aircraft are used to transport nuclear or SNM weapons by air, and after careful route selection. Aircraft selected for the task are subject to special safety checks and an enhanced maintenance regime.

SNM material is flown to the US under agreements. In a letter to the Campaign for Nuclear Disarmament, the MoD said they "can confirm that the Ministry of Defence does transport special nuclear material by air to the United States under the provisions of the 1958 UK/US Agreement for Cooperation on the Uses of Atomic Energy for Mutual Defence Purposes." Some non-nuclear states to the Nuclear Non-Proliferation Treaty (NPT) maintain that this movement of SNM breaks Article I of the NPT.

=== Used reactor fuel transport by rail ===
Used reactor fuel is transported by rail from Devonport (and occasionally Vulcan Naval Reactor Test Establishment, Dounreay when it was operational) to British Nuclear Fuels Limited (BNFL) at Sellafield. The used fuel is transported in protective purpose built transport containers designed in accordance with IAEA standards and loaded onto special wagons which may be configured for rail or road use. The train will carry one or two containers with each loaded onto a separate wagon.

The MoD is responsible for the consignment of used reactor fuel. All used fuel movements are escorted by the MDP SEG, who travel in a further two rail vehicles arranged at either end of the container transporter. Additional staff familiar with the load and capable of providing technical support during the journey, travel with the MDP SEG. The SEG communicate their position to the MDP at Wethersfield, and local police are informed in advance. The Fire Service would be informed by local agreement with the civil police.

=== Used reactor fuel transport by road ===
Used reactor fuel is transported by rail, and may involve a short road journey to the railhead. Security and safety measures are equivalent to those provided during road transport of new fuel. The used fuel consignment is transported in protective purpose-built transport containers designed in accordance with IAEA standards, and is loaded onto special wagons configured for rail as well as road use.

== Accident and terrorism risks ==
Transport containers for nuclear weapons, SNM and new and used reactor fuel, provide protection from impact, mechanical stress and fire. They are tested against International Atomic Energy Agency (IAEA) standards for abnormal environments.

In the event of an incident, control passes to Ministry of Defence Nuclear Accident Response Organisation (NARO). Defence Nuclear Material Transport Contingency Arrangements are in place in case of accidents involving DNMs.

In a report from the Nuclear Movements and Nuclear Accident Response Group an extreme accident could result in a nuclear explosion. A serious vehicle collision or an aircraft crash combined with multiple failures of the MoD's secret protective measures could mean that the weapon might not remain single-point safe. The report puts the overall yearly risk of an "inadvertent yield" in the UK at 2.4 in a billion, mainly due to the possibility of an aircraft crashing onto a nuclear weapons road convoy. Inadvertent yield suggests a partial nuclear explosion, also called fizzle yield, smaller than the full yield of up to 100 kilotons. The most significant health risk to members of public arises from the potential for a release of plutonium oxide aerosol from the fissile pit of a warhead, a high probability event if the warhead(s) was subject to intense fire sufficient to initiate detonation of the conventional high explosive compression packs that surrounds the nuclear heart of the warhead.

A potential risk of moving nuclear weapons is terrorist attack. In May 2005 the MoD's Director of Information, David Wray, refused a Freedom of Information request about convoy axle weights (it was alleged that the convoy had used a weak bridge) from an anti-nuclear activist on the grounds that it may help terrorists to plan an attack. "Such an attack has the potential to lead to damage or destruction of a nuclear weapon," he wrote. "The consequences of such an incident are likely to be considerable loss of life and severe disruption both to the British people's way of life and to the UK's ability to function effectively as a sovereign state."
