= Trident (UK nuclear programme) =

UK nuclear weapons programme

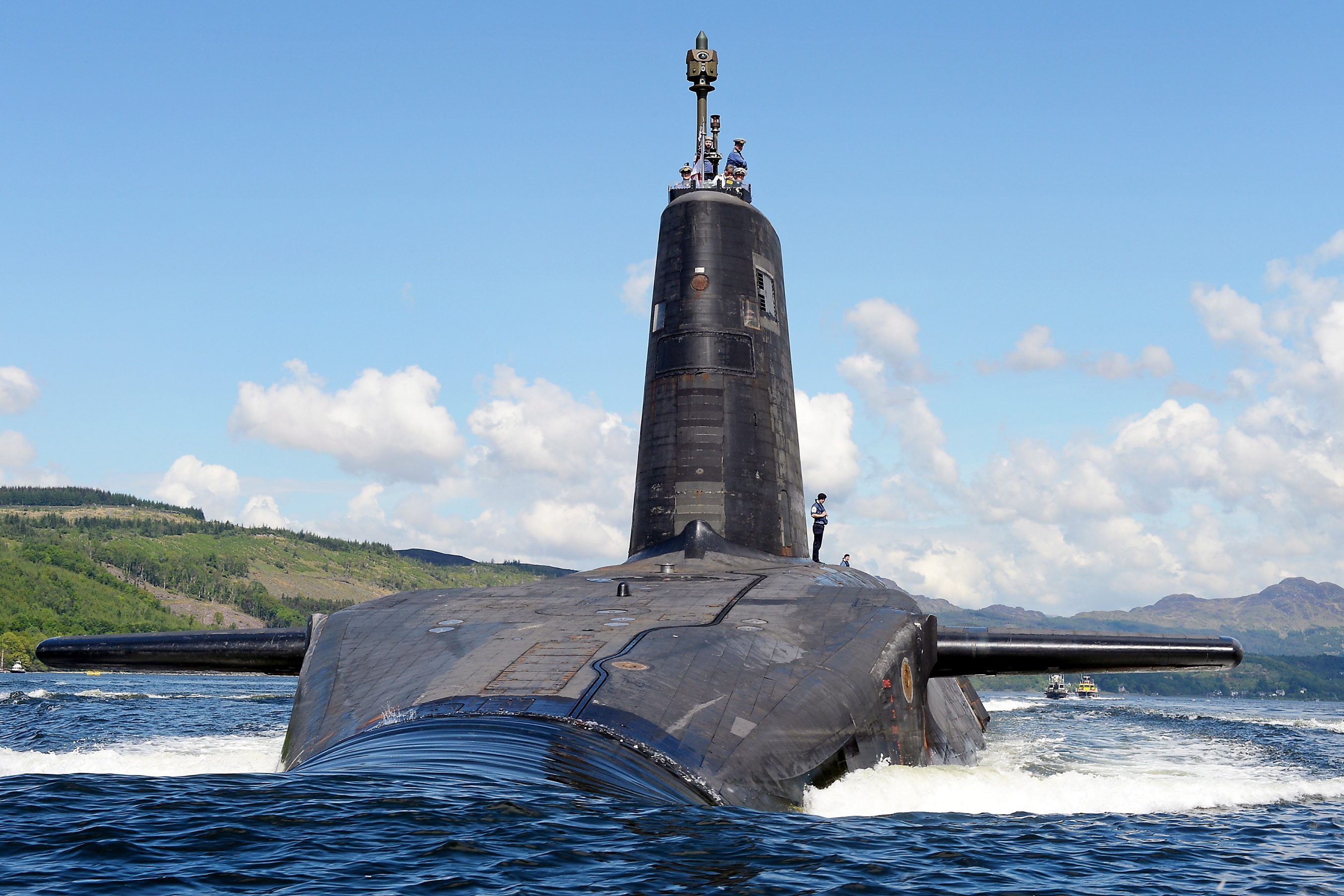
- HMS Victorious, a Trident missile–armed Vanguard-class submarine, leaving its base at HMNB Clyde on a training exercise in 2013
- Type of project: Deployment of Trident ballistic missile submarines
- Country: United Kingdom
- Established: 1980

Trident, also known as the Trident nuclear programme or Trident nuclear deterrent, covers the development, procurement and operation of submarine-based nuclear weapons in the United Kingdom. Its purpose, as stated by the Ministry of Defence, is to "deter the most extreme threats to our national security and way of life, which cannot be done by other means". Trident is an operational system of four Vanguard-class submarines armed with Trident II D-5 ballistic missiles, able to deliver thermonuclear warheads from multiple independently targetable reentry vehicles. It is operated by the Royal Navy and based at Clyde Naval Base on the west coast of Scotland. At least one submarine is always on patrol to provide "continuous at-sea deterrence". The missiles are manufactured in the United States, while the warheads are produced by the British Atomic Weapons Establishment. Trident began patrols in 1994, and fully replaced its predecessor, the Polaris submarine fleet, in 1996.

The missiles have an intercontinental range of 11,300 kilometres (7,000 mi). Up to 16 missiles can be carried by each submarine, and each missile can carry eight warheads in MIRV configuration. The warheads have a yield of 100 kilotons of TNT, six times greater than the bomb that destroyed Hiroshima. The design, codenamed "Holbrook", is believed to be based on the American W76 warhead used on its own Ohio-class submarines.

The programme's acquisition cost was £12.52 billion (approximately £23 billion in 2024/25 prices), and its annual cost is estimated at £3 billion. The submarines' service life was designed to be 25 years but will exceed 36 years. In 2016, the House of Commons voted by a large majority to proceed with building a fleet of Dreadnought-class submarines, to be operational by 2028, and to phase out the Vanguard fleet by 2032. A new warhead, Astraea, is also planned to be introduced in the 2030s.

Critics argue that geopolitical threats do not necessitate the high cost of Trident, or that threatening to use strategic nuclear weapons is unethical and likely to violate international law. According to YouGov, as of June 2025, 50% of British adults support replacement of Trident with an equally powerful system.

The British government initially negotiated with the Carter administration for the purchase of the Trident I C-4 missile. In 1981, the Reagan administration announced its decision to upgrade its Trident to the new Trident II D-5 missile. This necessitated another round of negotiations and concessions. The UK Trident programme was announced in July 1980 and patrols began in December 1994. Trident replaced the submarine-based Polaris system, in operation from 1968 until 1996. Trident is the only nuclear weapon system operated by the UK since the decommissioning of tactical WE.177 free-fall bombs in 1998.

NATO's military posture was relaxed after the collapse of the Soviet Union in 1991. Trident warheads have never been aimed at specific targets on an operational patrol, but await co-ordinates that can be programmed into their computers and fired with several days' notice. Under the Nassau Agreement, British nuclear weapons are committed to the defence of NATO. From 1995 to some time before 2021, a 10 kiloton sub-strategic yield option was included on one missile per submarine.

== Background ==
During the early part of the Second World War, the United Kingdom (UK) had a nuclear weapons project, code-named Tube Alloys, which the 1943 Quebec Agreement merged with the American Manhattan Project to create a combined American, British, and Canadian project. The British government expected that the United States (US) would continue to share nuclear technology, which it regarded as a joint discovery, but the United States Atomic Energy Act of 1946 (McMahon Act) ended technical co-operation. Fearing a resurgence of US isolationism, and losing its own great power status, the British government resumed its own development effort. The first British atomic bomb was tested in Operation Hurricane on 3 October 1952. The subsequent British development of the hydrogen bomb, and a fortuitous international relations climate created by the Sputnik crisis, facilitated the amendment of the McMahon Act, and the 1958 US–UK Mutual Defence Agreement (MDA), which allowed Britain to acquire nuclear weapons systems from the US, thereby restoring the nuclear Special Relationship.

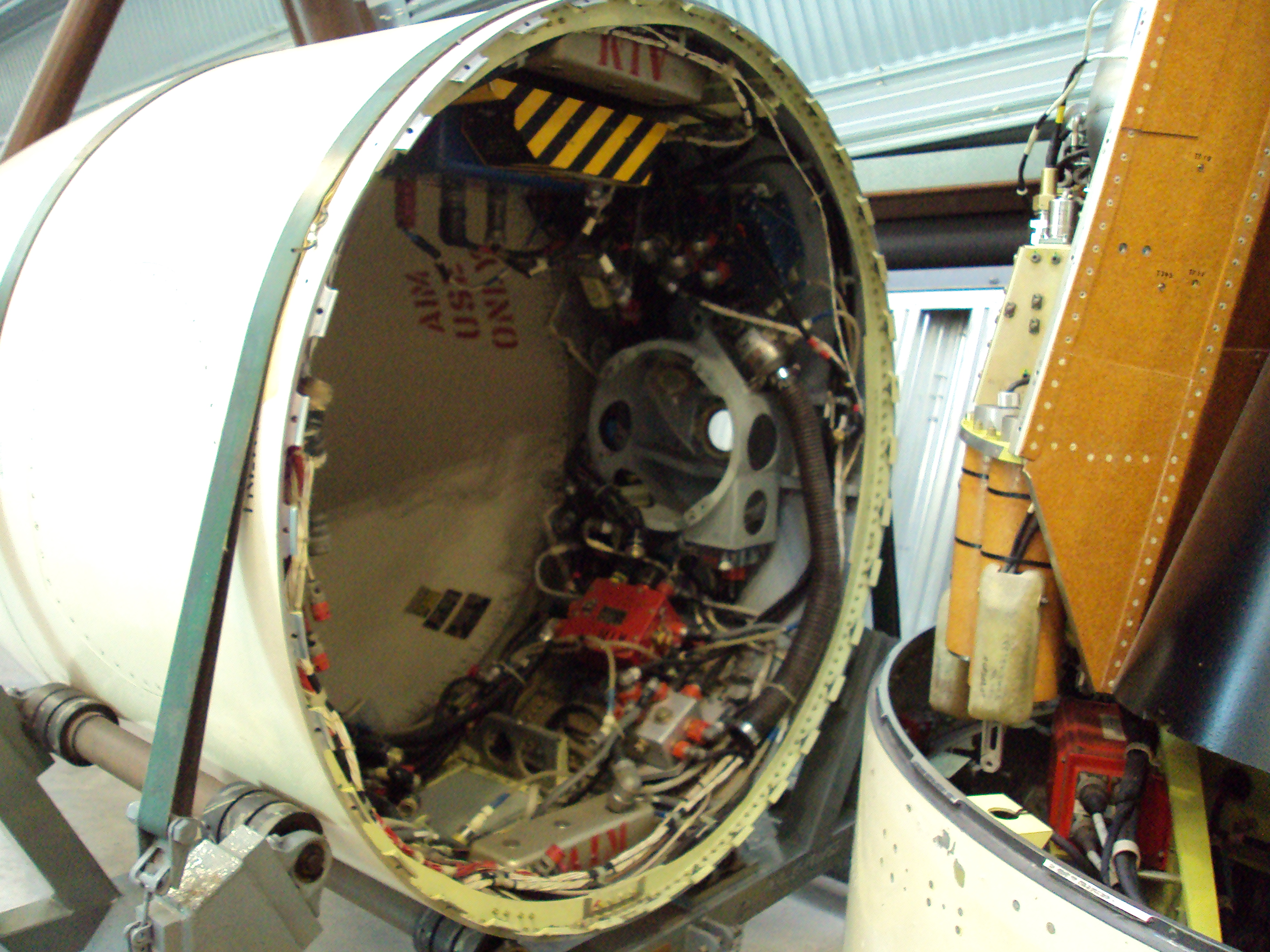
A Polaris missile at the Royal Air Force Museum Cosford, with Chevaline (right)

During the 1950s, Britain's nuclear deterrent was based around the V-bombers of the Royal Air Force (RAF), but developments in radar and surface-to-air missiles made it clear that bombers were becoming increasingly vulnerable, and would be unlikely to penetrate Soviet airspace by the mid-1970s. To address this problem, the UK embarked on the development of a Medium Range Ballistic Missile called Blue Streak, but concerns were raised about its own vulnerability, and the British government decided to cancel it and acquire the American Skybolt air-launched ballistic missile. In return, the Americans were given permission to base the US Navy's Polaris boats at Holy Loch in Scotland. In November 1962, the American government cancelled Skybolt. John F. Kennedy, then President of the United States, and Harold Macmillan, then UK Prime Minister, negotiated the Nassau Agreement, under which the US would sell Polaris systems for UK-built submarines, in exchange for the general commitment of the submarines to NATO. This was formalised in the Polaris Sales Agreement.

The first British Polaris ballistic missile submarine (SSBN), HMS Resolution, was laid down by Vickers-Armstrongs at its yard at Barrow-in-Furness in Cumbria on 26 February 1964. She was launched on 15 September 1965, commissioned on 2 October 1967, and conducted a test firing at the American Eastern Range on 15 February 1968. She was followed by HMS Repulse, which was completed by Vickers-Armstrongs on 29 September 1968; and two boats built by Cammell Laird in Birkenhead: HMS Renown, which was completed on 15 November 1968; and HMS Revenge, which was completed on 4 December 1969. The four Resolution-class boats were based at HMNB Clyde at Faslane on the Firth of Clyde, not far from the US Navy's base at Holy Loch, which opened in August 1968. It was served by a weapons store at nearby RNAD Coulport. HM Dockyard, Rosyth, was designated as the refit yard for the 10th Submarine Squadron, as the Polaris boats became operational.

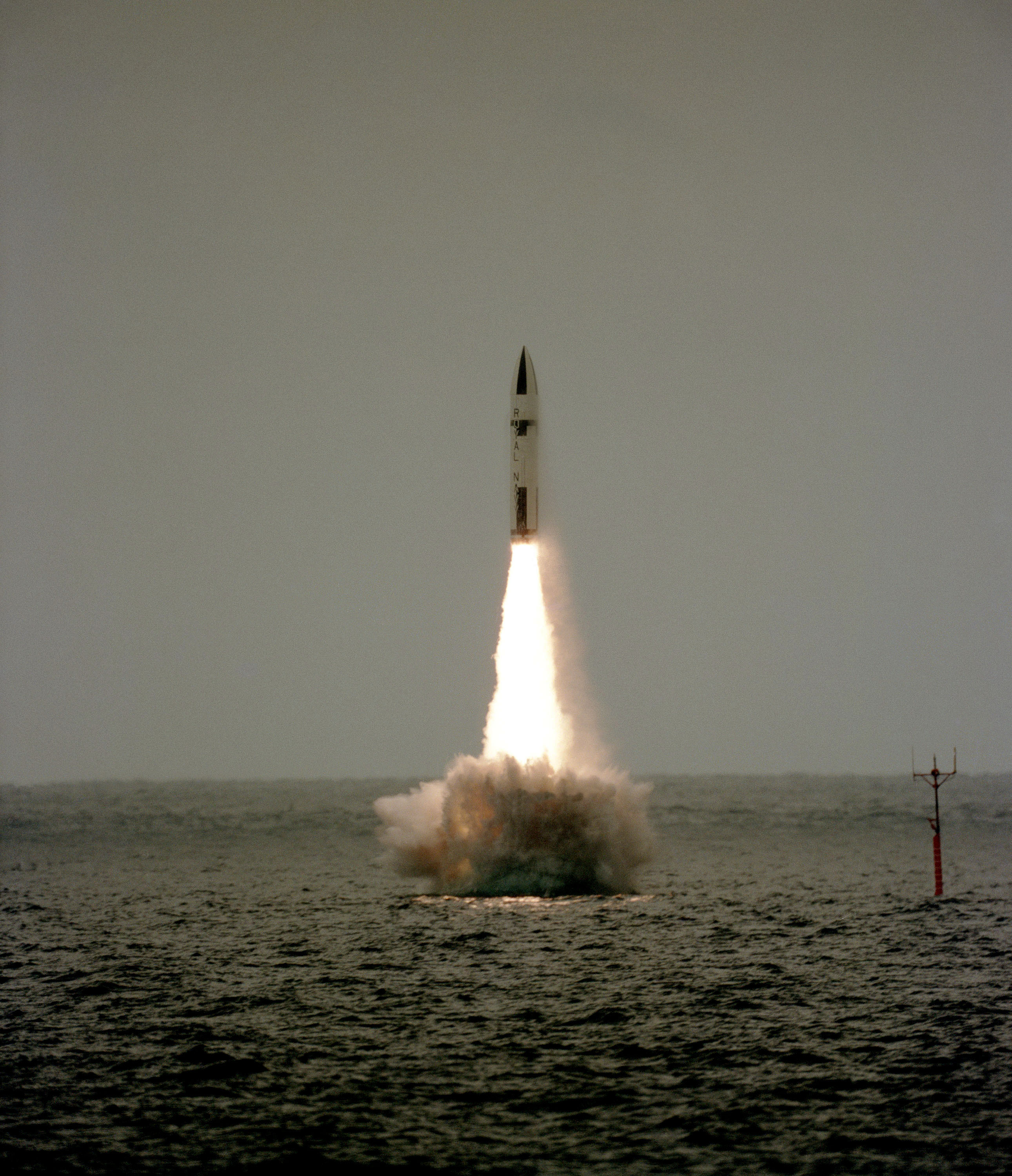
Polaris missile launch from Resolution-class submarine in 1983

Polaris proved to be reliable, and its second-strike capability conferred greater strategic flexibility than any previous British nuclear weapons system. However it had a limited lifespan, and was expected to become obsolete by the 1990s. It was considered vital that an independent British deterrent could penetrate existing and future Soviet anti-ballistic missile (ABM) capabilities. An ABM system, the ABM-1 Galosh, defended Moscow, and NATO believed the USSR would continue to develop its effectiveness. The deterrent logic required the ability to threaten the destruction of the Soviet capital and other major cities. To ensure that a credible and independent nuclear deterrent was maintained, the UK developed an improved warhead package Chevaline, which replaced one of the three warheads in a Polaris missile with multiple decoys, chaff, and other defensive countermeasures. Chevaline was extremely expensive; it encountered many of the same issues that had affected the British nuclear weapons projects of the 1950s, and postponed, but did not avert, Polaris's obsolescence.

The Conservative Party had a strong pro-defence stance, and supported the British nuclear weapons programme, although not necessarily at the expense of conventional weapons. The rival Labour Party had initiated the acquisition of nuclear weapons, but in the late 1950s its left wing pushed for a policy of nuclear disarmament, resulting in an ambiguous stance. While in office from 1964 to 1970 and 1974 to 1979, it built and maintained Polaris, and modernised it through the secret Chevaline programme. In opposition in the early 1980s, Labour adopted a policy of unilateral nuclear disarmament.

More important than political differences was a shared sense of British national identity. Britain was seen as an important player in world affairs, its economic and military weaknesses offset by its membership of NATO and the Group of Seven, its then active membership of the European Union, its permanent seat on the UN Security Council, its leadership of the Commonwealth of Nations, and the nuclear Special Relationship with the US. To accept a position of inferiority to its ancient rival, France, was unthinkable. Moreover, the UK sees itself as a force for good in the world with a moral duty to intervene, with military force if need be, to defend both its interests and its values. By the 1980s, possession of nuclear weapons was considered a visible sign of Britain's enduring status as a great power in spite of the loss of the British Empire, and had become a component of the national self-image.

== Negotiations ==
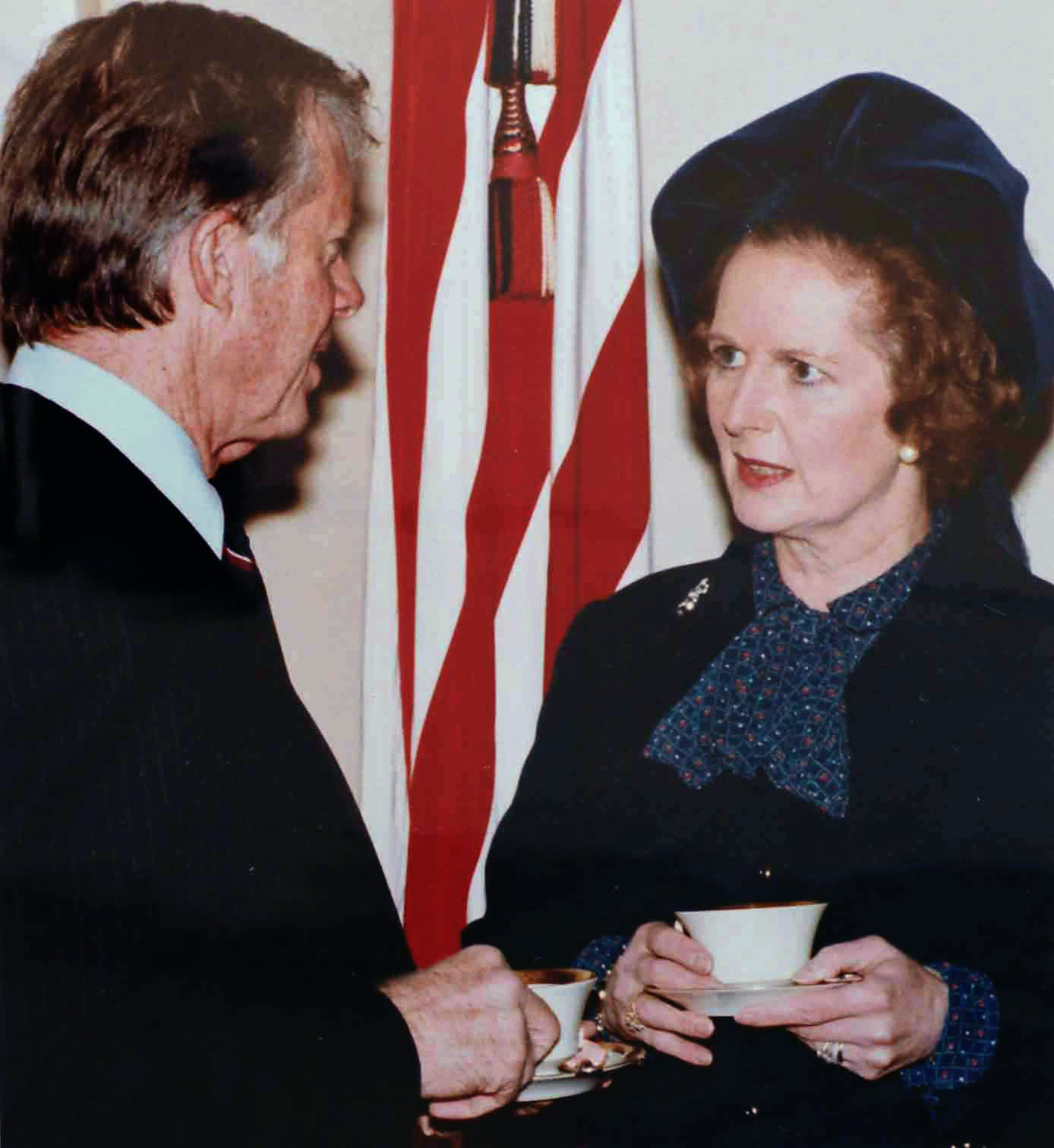
Margaret Thatcher visits President Jimmy Carter on 17 December 1979

The Cabinet Secretary, Sir John Hunt briefed Cabinet on Polaris on 28 November 1977, noting that a possible successor might take up to 15 years to bring into service, depending on the nature of system chosen, and whether it was to be developed by the UK, or in collaboration with France or the US. With the recent experience of Chevaline in mind, the option of a purely British project was rejected. A study of the options was commissioned in February 1978 from a group chaired by the Deputy Under-Secretary of State at the Foreign Office, Sir Antony Duff, with the Chief Scientific Adviser to the Ministry of Defence, Sir Ronald Mason. The Duff-Mason Report was delivered to the Prime Minister, James Callaghan, in parts on 11 and 15 December. It recommended the purchase of the American Trident I C-4 missile then in service with the US Navy. The C-4 had multiple independently targetable reentry vehicle (MIRV) capability, which was needed to overcome the Soviet ABM defences.

Callaghan approached President Jimmy Carter in January 1979, who responded positively, but did not commit. The Carter administration's main priority was the SALT II Agreement with the Soviet Union, which limited nuclear weapons stockpiles. It was signed on 18 June 1979, but Carter faced an uphill battle to secure its ratification by the US Senate. MIRV technology had proved to be a major loophole in the 1972 SALT I Agreement, which limited numbers of missiles but not warheads. During the SALT II negotiations the US had resisted Soviet proposals to include the British and French nuclear forces in the agreement, but there were concerns that supplying MIRV technology to the UK would be seen by the Soviets as violating the spirit of the non-circumvention clause in SALT II.

Callaghan was succeeded by Margaret Thatcher following the general election on 3 May 1979, and she discussed the issue with Carter in October, who agreed to supply C-4, but he asked that the UK delay a formal request until December in order that he could get SALT II ratified beforehand. In the meantime, the MDA, without which the UK would not be able to access US nuclear weapons technology, was renewed for five more years on 5 December, and the MISC 7 cabinet committee formally approved the decision to purchase C-4 the following day. (Note: In the UK system, most of the day-to-day work of the cabinet is carried out by cabinet committees, rather than by the full cabinet. Each committee has its own area of responsibility, and their decisions are binding on the entire cabinet. Their membership and scope is determined by the Prime Minister. During the post-Second World War period, in addition to standing committees, there were ad hoc committees that were convened to handle a single issue. These were normally short-lived. Each was given a prefix of GEN (general) or MISC (miscellaneous) and a number in order of formation.) When Thatcher met with Carter again on 17 December, he still asked for more time, but the Soviet invasion of Afghanistan on 24 December ended all hope of Senate ratification of SALT II, clearing the way for the sale to proceed.

The British government hoped that Trident could be secured on the same terms as Polaris, but when its chief negotiator, Robert Wade-Gery, sat down with his American counterpart, David L. Aaron, in March 1980, he found this was not the case. Instead of the 5 per cent levy in recognition of US research and development (R&D) costs agreed to in the Polaris Sales Agreement, a 1976 law now required a pro rata fixed fee payment; the levy would have been approximately $100 million, however the fixed fee amounted to around $400 million.

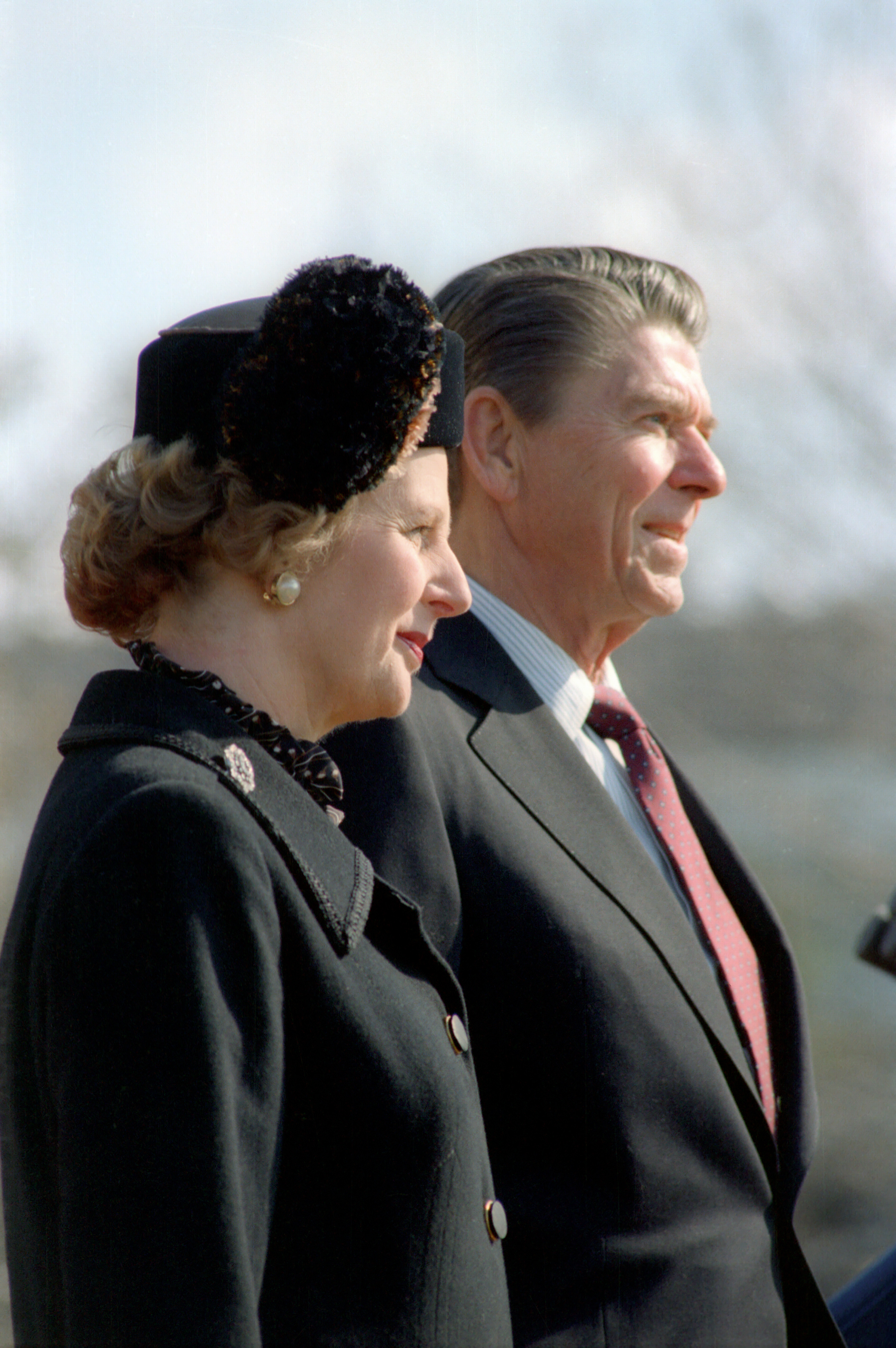
Margaret Thatcher and Ronald Reagan on 26 February 1981

The law could be waived if the President determined that it was in the interest of the US to do so, but for that the Carter administration wanted undertakings that the UK would raise defence spending by the same amount, or pay the cost of US forces manning Rapier batteries and Ground Launched Cruise Missile (GLCM) sites in the UK. On 2 June 1980, Thatcher and the US Secretary of Defense, Harold Brown, agreed to $2.5 billion for the C-4 missile system, plus a 5 per cent R&D levy, British personnel for the Rapier batteries, and an expansion of the US base on Diego Garcia, which had assumed great importance since the Soviet invasion of Afghanistan. The Secretary of State for Defence, Francis Pym, informed Cabinet of the decision to purchase Trident on 15 July 1980, and announced it in the House of Commons later that day. The agreement was effected by amending the Polaris Sales Agreement, changing "Polaris" to "Trident".

However, on 4 November 1980, Ronald Reagan was elected president. Part of his election platform was to modernise the US strategic nuclear forces. On 24 August 1981, the Reagan administration informed the British government of its intention to upgrade its Trident to the new Trident II D-5 missile by 1989, and indicated that it was willing to sell it to the UK. Despite the name, the D-5 was not an improved version of the C-4, but a completely new missile. Its purchase had already been considered in the Duff-Mason report, but had been rejected, as its additional capability—the extended range from 4,000 to 6,000 nautical miles (7,400 to 11,100 km)—was not required by the UK, and it was more expensive. Exactly how much more expensive was uncertain, as it was still under development. At the same time, the British government was well aware of the costs of not having the same hardware as the US. Nor did the Reagan administration promise to sell D-5 on the same terms as the C-4. To pay for Trident, the British government announced deep cuts to other defence spending on 25 June 1981.

Negotiations commenced on 8 February, with the British team again led by Wade-Gery. The Americans were disturbed at the proposed British defence cuts, and pressed for an undertaking that the aircraft carrier HMS Invincible be retained in service, which they felt was necessary to avert trouble over the Belizean–Guatemalan territorial dispute. They accepted a counter-offer that Britain would retain the two landing platform dock ships, HMS Fearless and Intrepid, for which the Americans reduced the R&D charge. Under the agreement, the UK would purchase 65 Trident II D-5 missiles that would operate as part of a shared pool of weapons based at Naval Submarine Base Kings Bay in the US. The US would maintain and support the missiles, while the UK would manufacture its own submarines and warheads to go on the missiles. The warheads and missiles would be mated in the UK. This was projected to save about £500 million over eight years at Coulport, while the Americans spent $70 million upgrading the facilities at Kings Bay. The sale agreement was formally signed on 19 October 1982 by the British Ambassador to the United States, Sir Oliver Wright, and the US Secretary of State, George Shultz.

The Trident programme was projected to cost £5 billion, including the four submarines, the missiles, new facilities at Coulport and Faslane and the contribution to Trident II D-5 R&D. It was expected to absorb 5 per cent of the defence budget. As with Polaris, the option for a fifth submarine (allowing two to be on patrol at all times) was discussed, but ultimately rejected. Thatcher's popularity soared as a result of the British victory in the Falklands War, in which the ships that the Americans had insisted be retained played a crucial part. Trident's future was secured the following year when the Conservative Party won the 1983 general election, defeating a Labour Party that had pledged to cancel Trident. The first Trident boat, HMS Vanguard was ordered on 30 April 1986. In view of the Labour Party's continued opposition to Trident, Vickers insisted that the contract include substantial compensation in the event of cancellation.

== UK's Nuclear Policies ==
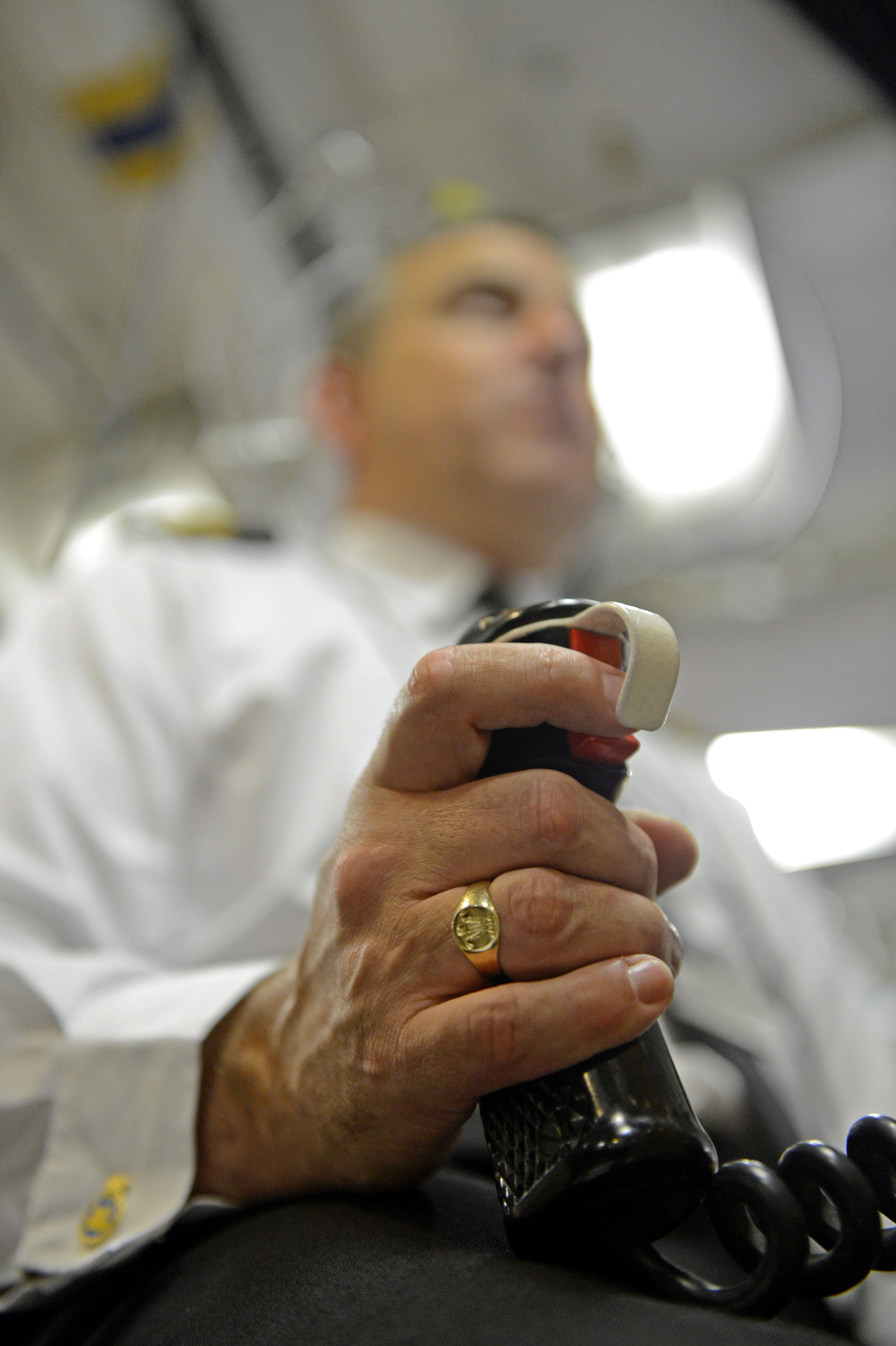
The training trigger used to launch a simulated Trident missile on HMS Vigilant

=== Cold War ===
The Trident programme was initiated during the Cold War, and it was designed to provide an ongoing independently controlled deterrent against major threats to the security of the UK and its NATO allies, including threats posed by non-nuclear weapons.

To provide an effective deterrent, the Trident system was intended to "pose a potential threat to key aspects of Soviet state power" whilst being invulnerable to a surprise or pre-emptive nuclear strike. As with Polaris, Trident was owned and operated by the UK but committed to NATO and targeted in accordance with plans set out by the organisation's Supreme Allied Commander Europe, who is traditionally a senior figure in the US military. Under the terms of the Polaris Sales Arrangement, the US does not have a veto on the use of British nuclear weapons, which the UK may launch independently, but this would only occur if "supreme national interests" required it.

The final decision on firing the missiles is the responsibility of the prime minister, who, upon taking office, writes four identical letters of last resort, one of which is locked in a safe on board each of the Vanguard-class submarines. If contact with the UK is lost, the commanding officer of a submarine has to follow the instructions in the letter if they believe that the United Kingdom has suffered an overwhelming attack. Options include retaliating with nuclear weapons, not retaliating, putting the submarine under the command of an ally, or acting as the captain deems appropriate. The exact content of the letters is never disclosed, and they are destroyed without being opened upon a new prime minister taking office.

=== Post-Cold War ===
By the time of the first Vanguard patrol in December 1994, the Soviet Union no longer existed, and the government adjusted its nuclear policy in the following years. Trident's missiles were "detargetted" in 1994 ahead of Vanguard's maiden voyage. The warheads are not aimed at specific targets but await co-ordinates that can be programmed into their computers and fired with several days' notice.

Under the terms of the 1987 Intermediate-Range Nuclear Forces Treaty with the Soviet Union, the US withdrew its surface naval nuclear weapons and short-range nuclear forces. The GLCMs were withdrawn from the UK in 1991, and the Polaris submarine base at Holy Loch was closed in 1992. The last US warheads in British service under Project E, the B57 nuclear depth bombs and the Lance missiles and W48 nuclear artillery shells used by the British Army of the Rhine, were withdrawn in July 1992. The British Conservative government followed suit. The deployment of ships carrying nuclear weapons caused embarrassment during the Falklands War, and in the aftermath it was decided to stockpile them ashore in peacetime. The nuclear depth bombs were withdrawn from service in 1992, followed by the WE.177 free-fall bombs used by the Royal Navy and RAF on 31 March 1998. This left Trident as Britain's sole nuclear weapons system.

Although Trident was designed as a strategic deterrent, the end of the Cold War led the British government to conclude that a sub-strategic—but not tactical—role was required, with Trident missiles assuming the role formerly handled by the RAF's WE.177 bombs. The 1994 Defence White Paper stated: "We also need the capability to undertake nuclear action on a more limited scale in order to ... halt aggression without inevitably triggering strategic nuclear exchanges". A later statement read: "We also intend to exploit the flexibility of Trident to provide the vehicle for both sub-strategic and strategic elements of our deterrent … as an insurance against potential adverse trends in the international situation". On 19 March 1998, the Defence Secretary, George Robertson, was asked to provide a statement "on the development of a lower-yield variant of the Trident warhead for the sub-strategic role". He replied, "the UK has some flexibility in the choice of yield for the warheads on its Trident missiles".

The UK has not declared a no first use policy regarding launching a nuclear attack; former British defence secretary Geoff Hoon stated in 2002 and 2003 that the UK would be willing to attack rogue states with them if nuclear weapons were used against British troops. In April 2017 Defence Secretary Michael Fallon confirmed that the UK would use nuclear weapons in a "pre-emptive initial strike" in "the most extreme circumstances". Fallon stated in a parliamentary answer that the UK has neither a 'first use' or 'no first use' in its nuclear weapon policy so that its adversaries would not know when the UK would launch nuclear strikes.

In March 2021, the UK suggested a shift in nuclear policy in its Integrated Defence Review, stating that the UK would reserve the right to use nuclear weapons in the face of weapons of mass destruction, which includes "emerging technologies that could have a considerable impact", including cyber technologies, to chemical or biological weapons. This marks a shift from existing UK policy, in that nuclear weapons would only be launched against another nuclear power or in response to extreme chemical or biological threats. It did, however, stress that the UK would not use or threaten to use nuclear weapons against any non-nuclear weapon party to the Treaty on the Non-Proliferation of Nuclear Weapons 1968, but only if the state is not in "material breach" of the Treaty's obligations. The shift in language comes after the UK lifted the cap on the number of Trident nuclear warheads it can stockpile by 40% from 180 to 260 warheads "in recognition of the evolving security environment". The UK has also stated it would no longer declare how many deployable warheads under a new policy of deliberate ambiguity. The move is intended to cement the UK's status as a nuclear power and a US defence ally. Labour Party Leader Keir Starmer, although supporting nuclear deterrence, criticised the new policy and questioned why Prime Minister Boris Johnson believed that increasing the stockpile was necessary. Kate Hudson of the Campaign for Nuclear Disarmament warned against the start of a "new nuclear arms race".

== Design, development and construction ==
=== Vanguard-class submarines ===
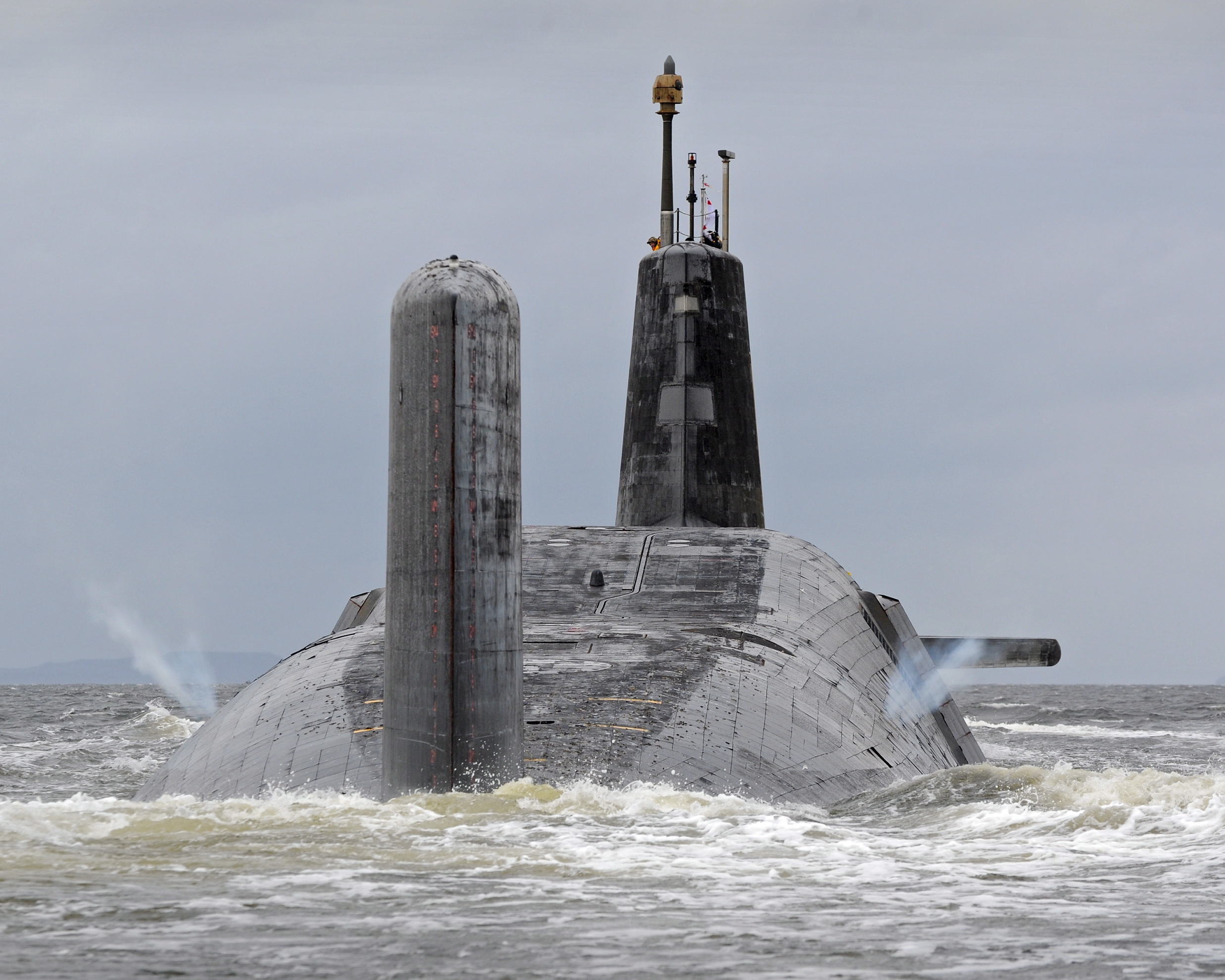
HMS Vanguard leaves HMNB Clyde in Scotland.

Four Vanguard-class submarines were designed and built at Barrow-in-Furness by Vickers Shipbuilding and Engineering, now BAE Systems Submarines, the only shipbuilder in the UK with the facilities and expertise to build nuclear submarines. Even so, £62 million worth of new shipbuilding and dock facilities were added for the project, with the Devonshire Dock Hall built specially for it. The initial plan was to build new versions of the Resolution-class, but in July 1981 the decision was taken to incorporate the new Rolls-Royce PWR2 pressurised water reactor. From the outset, the Vanguard submarines were designed with enlarged missile tubes able to accommodate the Trident II D-5. The missile compartment is based on the system used on the American Ohio class, although with capacity for only 16 missiles, rather than the 24 on board an Ohio boat. The boats are significantly larger than the Resolution class, and were given names formerly associated with battleships and aircraft carriers, befitting their status as capital ships. An important consideration was the depth of the Walney Channel, which connected Barrow to the Irish Sea, which limited the draft to 27 1/2 feet (8.4 m), while the Ohio-class boats had a draft of 33 feet (10 m). Each boat is 150 metres (490 ft) long and 13 metres (43 ft) in diameter, and carries a crew of 150 officers and ratings.

The submarines use a tactical-information and weapons-control system called the Submarine Command System Next Generation. This system was developed in collaboration with Microsoft, and is based on the same technology as Windows XP, which led the media to give it the nickname "Windows for Submarines", with the UK Defence Journal fact checking group countering claims the vessels run on Windows XP. In addition to the missile tubes, the submarines are fitted with four 21-inch (533 mm) torpedo tubes and carry the Spearfish torpedo, allowing them to engage submerged or surface targets at ranges up to 65 kilometres (40 mi; 35 nmi). Two SSE Mark 10 launchers are also fitted, allowing the boats to deploy Type 2066 and Type 2071 decoys, and a UAP Mark 3 electronic support measures (ESM) intercept system is carried. A "Core H" reactor is fitted to each of the boats during their long-overhaul refit periods, ensuring that none of the submarines will need further re-fuelling.

Thatcher laid the keel of the first boat, HMS Vanguard, on 3 September 1986, and it was commissioned on 14 August 1993. She was followed by her sisters, HMS Victorious, which was laid down on 3 December 1987 and commissioned on 7 January 1995; HMS Vigilant, which was laid down on 16 February 1991 and commissioned on 2 November 1996; and HMS Vengeance, which was laid down on 1 February 1993 and commissioned on 27 November 1999. The first British Trident missile was test-fired from Vanguard on 26 May 1994, and she began her first patrol in December of that year. According to the Royal Navy, at least one submarine has always been on patrol ever since.

=== Warheads ===
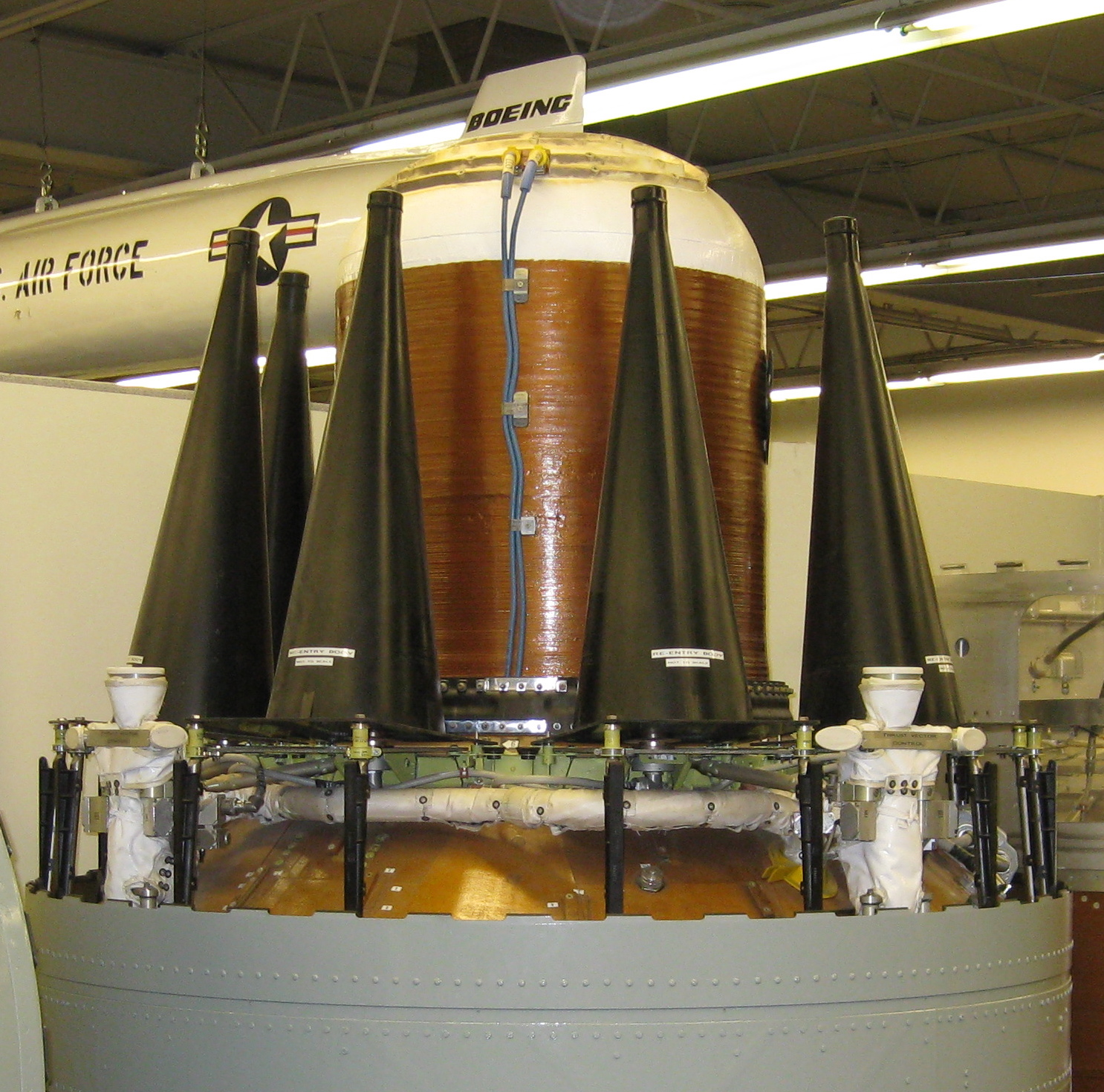
Models of the black warhead re-entry vehicles on a Trident missile at the National Museum of Nuclear Science & History in New Mexico

In British service, Trident II missiles are fitted with a thermonuclear warhead called Holbrook. The warhead has a choice of two warhead yields the highest of which is thought to be 100 kilotons of TNT (420 TJ), with a lower yield in the range of 0.3 to 10 kilotons of TNT (1.3 to 41.8 TJ). The UK government was sensitive to charges that the replacement of Polaris with Trident would involve an escalation in the numbers of British nuclear weapons. When the decision to purchase Trident II was announced in 1982, it was stressed that while American Trident boats carried 24 missiles with eight warheads each, a total of 192 warheads, British Trident boats would carry no more than 128 warheads—the same number as Polaris. In November 1993, the Secretary of State for Defence, Malcolm Rifkind, announced that each boat would deploy no more than 96 warheads. In 2010 this was reduced to a maximum of 40 warheads, split between eight missiles. The consequent reduction in warhead production and refurbishment was estimated to save £22 million over a ten-year period. However in 2021 the Prime Minister Boris Johnson announced that the total number of warheads was being lifted from 180 to 260.

The warheads are primarily constructed at AWE Aldermaston, with other parts being made at other AWE facilities such as Burghfield. The British government insists the warhead is indigenously designed, but analysts including Hans M. Kristensen with the Federation of American Scientists believe that it is largely based on the US W76 design. Under the 1958 US–UK Mutual Defence Agreement the UK is allowed to draw upon US warhead design information, but constructing and maintaining warheads for the Trident programme is the responsibility of AWE. US President George H. W. Bush authorised the transfer of nuclear warhead components to the UK between 1991 and 1996. The first Holbrook warhead was finished in September 1992 with production probably ending in 1999. Each warhead is housed in a cone-shaped re-entry vehicle made in the US called the Mark 4 and is the same reentry vehicle used by the US Navy with its W76 warhead. This shell protects it from the high temperatures experienced upon re-entry into Earth's atmosphere. The Trident warhead's fusing, arming and firing mechanisms are carefully designed so that it can only detonate after launch and ballistic deployment.

On 25 February 2020, the UK released a Written Statement outlining that the current UK nuclear warheads will be replaced and will match the US Trident SLBM and related systems. Earlier, it was reported that Commander US Strategic Command, Admiral Charles A. Richard, mentioned in a Senate hearing that the UK was already working to replace its warheads, which would share technology with the future W93 warhead. In March 2024, the Ministry of Defence released a report which detailed, the replacement warhead would be designated as the A21/Mk7 and named Astraea. The A21 Astraea warhead is to be a "sovereign design". It will be the first UK warhead to be deployed without live tests, relying on simulations and models from the AWE and EPURE, a joint UK-French facility. It is expected to enter service with the Dreadnought-class submarines.

As of 2016, the UK had a stockpile of 215 warheads, of which 120 are operationally available. In 2022 the UK Government announced that "the UK will move to an overall nuclear weapon stockpile of no more than 260 warheads." British SSBNs on patrol carried a maximum of 40 warheads and 8 missiles. In 2011 it was reported that British warheads would receive the new Mark 4A reentry vehicles and some or all of the other upgrades that US W76 warheads were receiving in their W76-1 Life Extension Program. Some reports suggested that British warheads would receive the same arming, fusing and firing system (AF&F) as the US W76-1. This new AF&F system, called the MC4700, would increase weapon lethality against hard targets such as missile silos and bunkers.

Due to the distance of 720 km (450 mi) between AWE Aldermaston and the UK's nuclear weapon storage depot at RNAD Coulport, Holbrook (Trident) warheads are transported by road in heavily armed convoys by Ministry of Defence Police. According to a pressure group, between 2000 and 2016 the vehicles were involved in 180 incidents, ranging from delays and diversions because of accidents, protests, or bad weather, to a sudden loss of power in one of the lorries, which halted a convoy and caused a double lane closure and a tailback on the M6 motorway. The group's analysis stated the incidents were more frequent in the years 2013–2015.

==== Sub-strategic option ====
From 1995 to sometime before 2021, as a response to the end of the Cold War and the UK's elimination of its WE.177 tactical nuclear weapons, Trident submarines operated a "sub-strategic" mission. Analysts believe a single missile on each submarine was armed with one or two warheads with only a 10 kiloton yield, as opposed to the full eight at 100 kilotons.

In 1997, the UK government stated "A substrategic strike would be an attack of a more restricted kind, perhaps against a specific military target". In 2006, a former SSBN commander told the UK Select Committee on Defence "[The sub-strategic option] is not a system that is geared or operated to achieve military objectives, by which I mean taking out a town, city, territory or whatever ... it offers the government of the day an extra option in the escalatory process before it goes for an all-out strategic strike which would deliver unacceptable damage to a potential adversary. It gives it a lower level of strike with which to demonstrate will, intent or whatever."

In 2021, a UK defense official informed researchers Hans M. Kristensen and Matt Korda that the sub-strategic option was no longer operational. The UK government previously stopped using the term due to a public perception that it was a tactical nuclear weapons system, that it had a lower threshold for use, and that it could be used against non-nuclear targets.

=== Trident II D-5 missiles ===
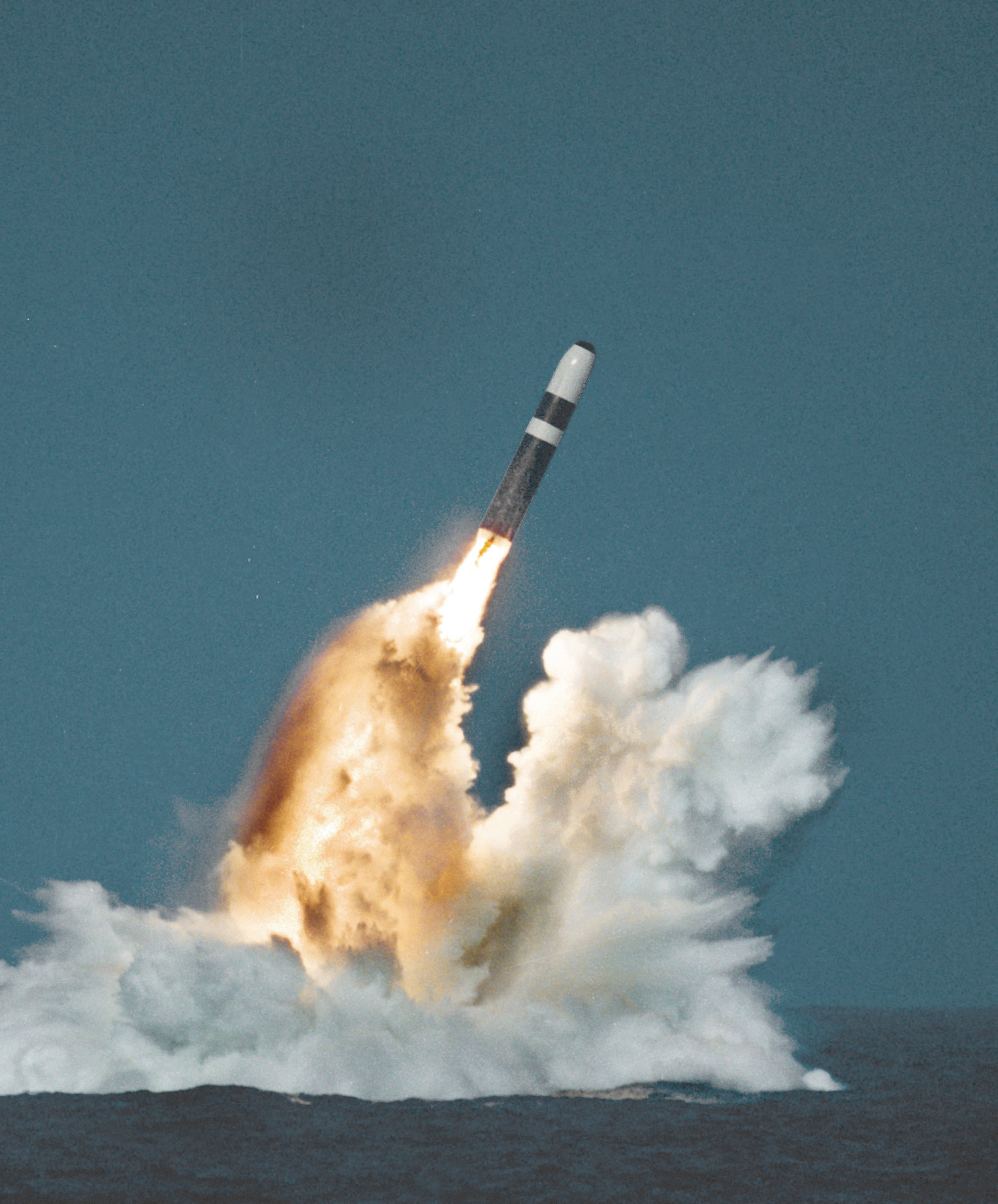
Test launch of a Trident II missile

Trident II D-5 is a submarine-launched ballistic missile built by Lockheed Martin Space Systems in Sunnyvale, California, and deployed by the US Navy and the Royal Navy. The British government contributed five per cent of its research and development costs under the modified Polaris Sales Agreement. The development contract was issued in October 1983, and the first launch occurred in January 1987. The first submarine launch was attempted by USS Tennessee in March 1989. This attempt failed because the plume of water following the missile rose to a greater height than expected, resulting in water being in the nozzle when the motor ignited. Once the problem was understood, simple changes were quickly made, but the problem delayed the entry into service of Trident II until March 1990.

Trident II D-5 is more sophisticated than its predecessor, Trident I C-4, and has a greater payload capacity. All three stages of the Trident II D-5 are made of graphite epoxy, making the missile much lighter than its predecessor. The first test from a British Vanguard-class submarine took place in 1994. The missile is 13 metres (43 ft) long, weighs 58.5 tonnes (57.6 long tons), has a range of 11,300 kilometres (7,000 mi), a top speed of over 21,600 km/h (13,400 mph) (Mach 17.4) and a circular error probable (CEP) accuracy to within "a few feet". It is guided using an inertial navigation system combined with a star tracker, and is not dependent on the American-run Global Positioning System (GPS).

The 1998 Strategic Defence Review announced that the number of missile bodies would be limited to the 58 already purchased or under order, and the Royal Navy would not receive the final seven missiles previously planned. This saved about £50 million. The UK missiles form a shared pool with the Atlantic squadron of the US Navy Ohio-class SSBNs at Kings Bay. The pool is "co-mingled" and missiles are selected at random for loading on to either nation's submarines. The first Trident boat, HMS Vanguard, collected a full load of 16 missiles in 1994, but Victorious collected only 12 in 1995, and Vigilant, 14 in 1997, leaving the remaining missile tubes empty.

By 1999, six missiles had been test fired, and another eight were earmarked for test firing. In June 2016, a Trident II D-5 missile test experienced anomalies with the telemetry equipment used, meaning it triggered a sequence to bring down the missile, as it could not be tracked to ensure it came down within its range safety conditions. The incident was not revealed until January 2017; the Sunday Times alleged that Downing Street had "covered up" the incident "just weeks before the crucial House of Commons vote on the future of the missile system." Subsequent media reports said this was at the request of the US. A second failure occurred at the next launch in January 2024. It was claimed the fault was specific to the test and would have been unlikely to occur when using a real nuclear warhead, according to the Ministry of Defence. In both instances, the failure was due to additional telemetric test-firing equipment, not used for live firing.

Successful Royal Navy test firings had occurred in 2000, 2005, 2009 and 2012. They are infrequent due to the missile's £17 million cost. As of 2024, there have been 196 successful test firings of the Trident II D-5 missile from submarines since 1989, and 5 failed tests.

=== Cost ===
By 1998, the programme's acquisition cost was £12.52 billion (approximately £23 billion in 2024/25 prices). As of the 2022/23, its annual cost is estimated at £3 billion or 6% of the defence budget. In 2005–06, annual expenditure for the running and capital costs was estimated at between £1.2 billion and £1.7 billion and was estimated to rise to £2bn to £2.2 billion in 2007–08, including Atomic Weapons Establishment costs. Since Trident became operational in 1994, annual expenditure has ranged between 3 and 4.5 per cent of the annual defence budget, and was projected to increase to 5.5 per cent of the defence budget by 2007–08. An important factor in the cost was the exchange rate between the dollar and the pound, which declined from $2.36 in September 1980 to $1.78 in March 1982.

== Operation ==
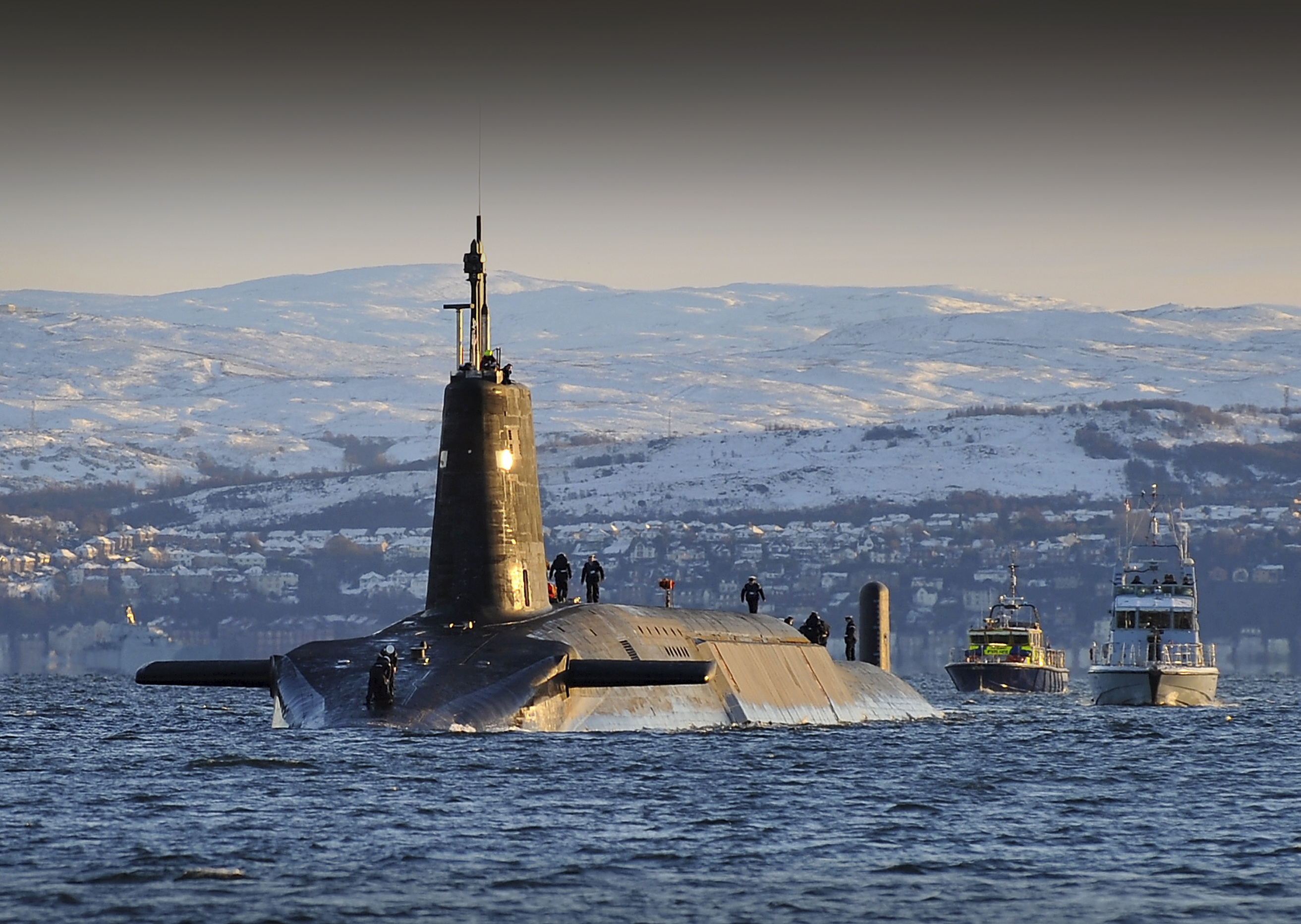
HMS Vanguard at Faslane

=== Patrols ===
The principle of Trident's operation is known as Continuous At-Sea Deterrence (CASD), which means that at least one submarine is always on patrol. Another submarine is usually undergoing maintenance and the remaining two are in port or on training exercises. During a patrol, the submarine is required to remain silent and is allowed to make contact with the UK only in an emergency. It navigates using mapped contour lines of the ocean floor and patrols a series of planned "boxes" measuring several thousand square miles. A 1,000-metre-long (3,300 ft) aerial trails on the surface behind the submarine to pick up incoming messages. Most of the 150 crew never know where they are or where they have been. The 350th patrol commenced on 29 September 2017. On 15 November 2018, a reception was held at Westminster to mark 50 years of CASD.

=== Command and control ===
Only the prime minister or a designated survivor can authorise the missiles to be fired. These orders would likely be issued from the Pindar command bunker under Whitehall in central London. From there, the order would be relayed to the Commander, Task Force 345 (CTF 345) operations room at the Northwood Headquarters facility in Hertfordshire, the only facility allowed to communicate with the Vanguard commander on patrol. Communications are relayed via IP over VLF from a transmitter site at Skelton near Penrith. Two personnel are required to authenticate each stage of the process before launching, with the submarine commander only able to activate the firing trigger after two safes have been opened with keys held by the ship's executive and weapon engineer officers. A parliamentary answer states that commanding officers of Royal Navy ballistic submarines receive training in the 'Law Of Armed Conflict'.

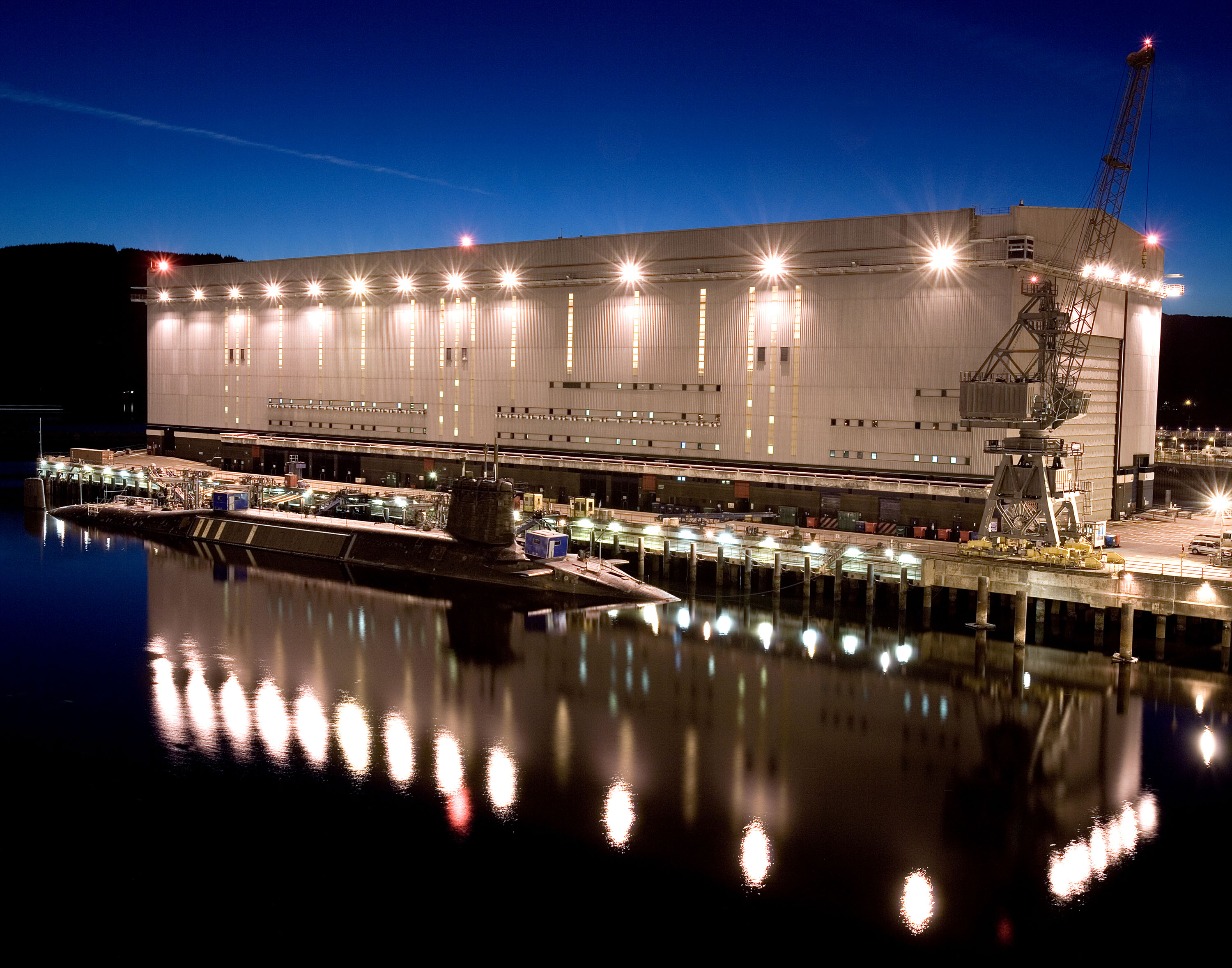
HMS Vigilant alongside No. 10 berth at HM Naval Base (HMNB) Clyde in October 2007

=== Bases ===
Trident is based at HMNB Clyde on the west coast of Scotland. The base consists of two facilities — Faslane Naval Base on Gare Loch near Helensburgh, and an ordnance depot with 16 concrete bunkers set into a hillside at Coulport, 4 km (2.5 mi) to the west. Faslane was constructed and first used as a base during the Second World War. This location was chosen as the base for nuclear-armed submarines at the height of the Cold War because of its position close to the deep and easily navigable Firth of Clyde. It provides for rapid and stealthy access through the North Channel to the patrolling areas in the North Atlantic, and through the GIUK gap between Iceland and Scotland to the Norwegian Sea. Also based there are Astute-class nuclear-powered fleet submarines (SSNs). RNAD Coulport is used to store the nuclear warheads and has docking facilities where they are loaded onto submarines before going on patrol and unloaded when they return to the base. Repair and refit of the Vanguard-class submarines takes place at HMNB Devonport near Plymouth, Devon.

=== Espionage ===
According to senior RAF officers the retirement of the Nimrod maritime patrol aircraft in 2011 gave Russia the potential to gain "valuable intelligence" on the country's nuclear deterrent. As a result, plans to buy Northrop Grumman MQ-4C Triton unmanned aerial vehicles were reportedly considered. The Strategic Defence and Security Review 2015 announced that nine Boeing P-8 Poseidon maritime patrol aircraft would be purchased for the RAF. They became operational on 3 April 2020.

== Opposition ==
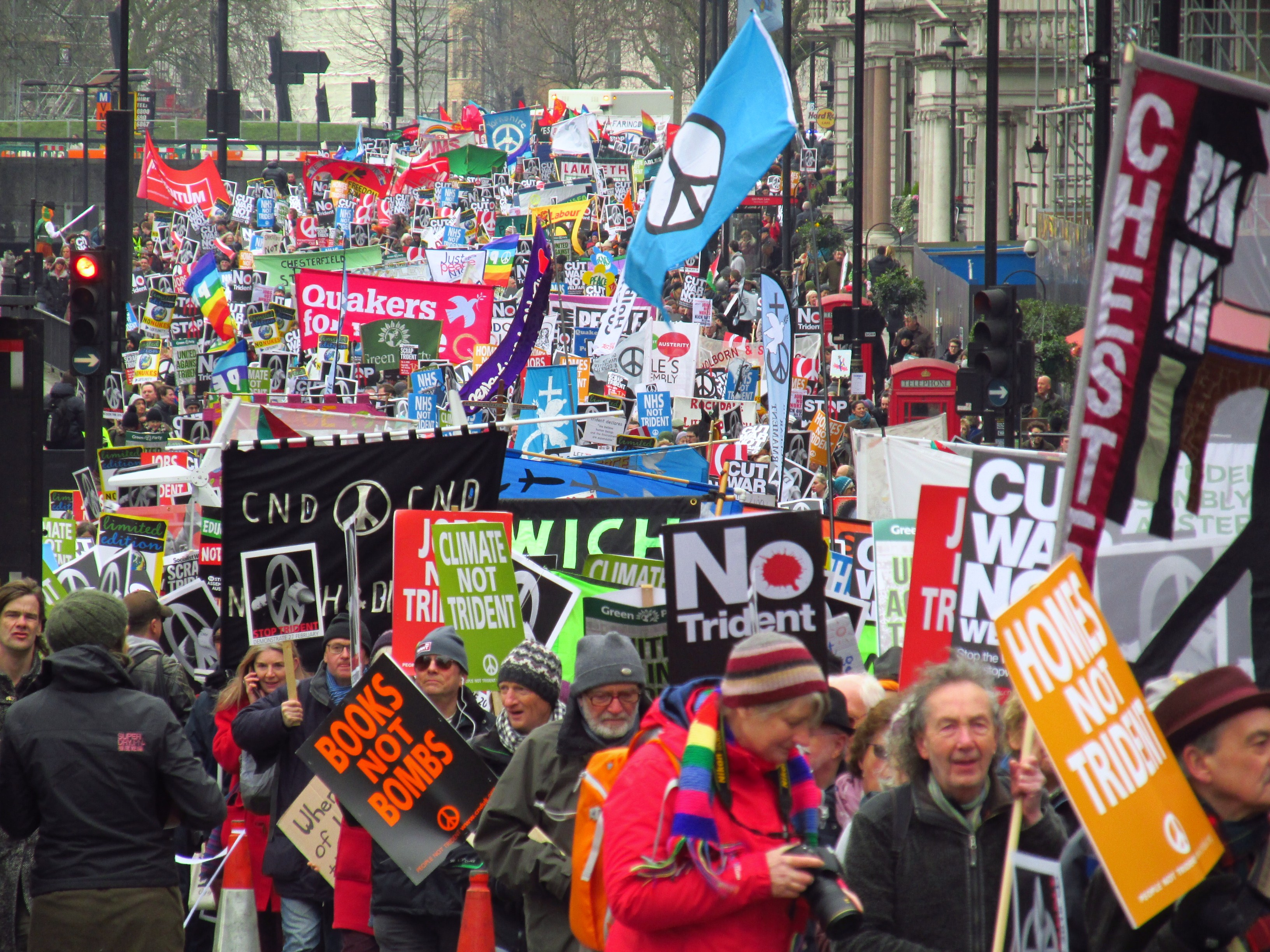
Anti-Trident demonstrators in London, February 2016

=== Anti-nuclear movement ===
The Campaign for Nuclear Disarmament (CND) was a national movement founded in the late 1950s, initially in opposition to nuclear testing. It reached its peak around 1960, by which time it had evolved into a broader movement calling for Britain to unilaterally give up nuclear weapons, withdraw from NATO, and end the basing of nuclear-armed aircraft in the UK. The end of atmospheric nuclear testing, internal squabbles, and activists focusing their energies on other causes led to a rapid decline, but it revived in the early 1980s in the wake of the Thatcher government's December 1979 decision to allow the deployment of GLCMs in the UK under the NATO Double-Track Decision, and the announcement of the decision to purchase Trident in July 1980. Membership leapt from 3,000 in 1980 to 50,000 a year later, and rallies for unilateral nuclear disarmament in London in October 1981 and June 1982 attracted 250,000 marchers, the largest ever mass demonstrations in the UK up to that time.

The 1982 Labour Party Conference adopted a platform calling for the removal of the GLCMs, the scrapping of Polaris and the cancellation of Trident. This was reaffirmed by the 1986 conference. While the party was given little chance of winning the 1983 election in the aftermath of the Falklands War, polls had shown Labour ahead of the Conservatives in 1986 and 1987. In the wake of Labour's unsuccessful performance in the 1987 election, the Labour Party leader, Neil Kinnock, despite his own unilateralist convictions, moved to drop the party's disarmament policy, which he saw as a contributing factor in its defeat. The party formally voted to do so in October 1989.

Faslane Peace Camp is permanently sited near Faslane naval base. It has been occupied continuously, albeit in different locations, since 12 June 1982. In 2006, a year-long protest at Trident's base at Faslane aimed to blockade the base every day for a year. More than 1,100 people were arrested.

During the 2020 coronavirus pandemic a letter was circulated to MPs by the Bertrand Russell Peace Foundation which stated, “It is completely unacceptable that the UK continues to spend billions of pounds on deploying and modernising the Trident Nuclear Weapon System when faced with the threats to health, climate change and world economies that Coronavirus poses.” Signatories included Commander Robert Forsyth RN (Ret'd), a former nuclear submariner; Commander Robert Green RN (Ret'd), a former nuclear-armed aircraft bombardier-navigator and Staff Officer (Intelligence) to CINFLEET in the Falklands War; and Commander Colin Tabeart RN (Ret'd), a former Senior Engineer Officer on a Polaris submarine. Following this the MoD updated its online instruction notice to staff on public communications to say, “All contact with the media or communication in public by members of the armed forces and MoD civilians where this relates to defence or government business must be authorised in advance”.

=== In Scotland ===
Pro-independence Scottish political parties—the Scottish National Party (SNP), Scottish Green Party, Scottish Socialist Party (SSP) and Solidarity—are opposed to the basing of the Trident system close to Glasgow, Scotland's largest city. Some members and ex-members of those parties, such as Tommy Sheridan and Lloyd Quinan, have taken part in blockades of the base. For a major House of Commons vote in 2007, the majority of Scottish members of parliament (MPs) voted against upgrading the system, while a substantial majority of English and Welsh MPs voted in favour. The house backed plans to renew the programme by 409 votes to 161.

=== Legality ===
Various arguments have been put forth, including by senior lawyers of the Matrix Chambers, that the operation, renewal, or use of Trident may violate international law, including international humanitarian law and customary international law. Some of the main potential violations include:

- Article VI of the Treaty on the Non-Proliferation of Nuclear Weapons: Trident renewal may violate obligations to pursue negotiations in good faith to the cessation of the nuclear arms race, to nuclear disarmament, and to general and complete disarmament.
  - The UK argues Trident renewal is consistent with the NPT, arguing the treaty sets no timetable for disarmament and allows renewal of existing capabilities.
  - A 2006 opinion by Philippe Sands and Helen Law of Matrix Chambers argued that Trident renewal could materially breach Article VI in four ways:
    - "broadening of the deterrence policy to incorporate prevention of nonnuclear attacks so as to justify replacing or upgrading Trident"
    - "attempts to justify Trident upgrade or replacement as an insurance against unascertainable future threats"
    - "Enhancing the targeting capability or yield flexibility of the Trident system"
    - "Renewal or replacement of Trident at the same capability"
- The law of war
  - Trident use may violate the principle of proportionality.
    - The 2006 opinion argued that the UK posture on use to protect "vital interests", including NATO, is broader than the "very survival of the state" standard established by the International Court of Justice.
  - Trident use may violate the principle against indiscriminate attacks and the principle against unnecessary suffering.
    - A 2005 opinion by Rabinder Singh and Christine Chinkin of Matrix Chambers argued Trident use "would infringe the "intransgressible" [principles of international customary law] requirement that a distinction must be drawn between combatants and non-combatants"
    - The 2006 opinion argued "it [is] hard to envisage any scenario in which the use of Trident, as currently constituted, could be consistent with the IHL prohibitions on indiscriminate attacks and unnecessary suffering"

== Reviews ==
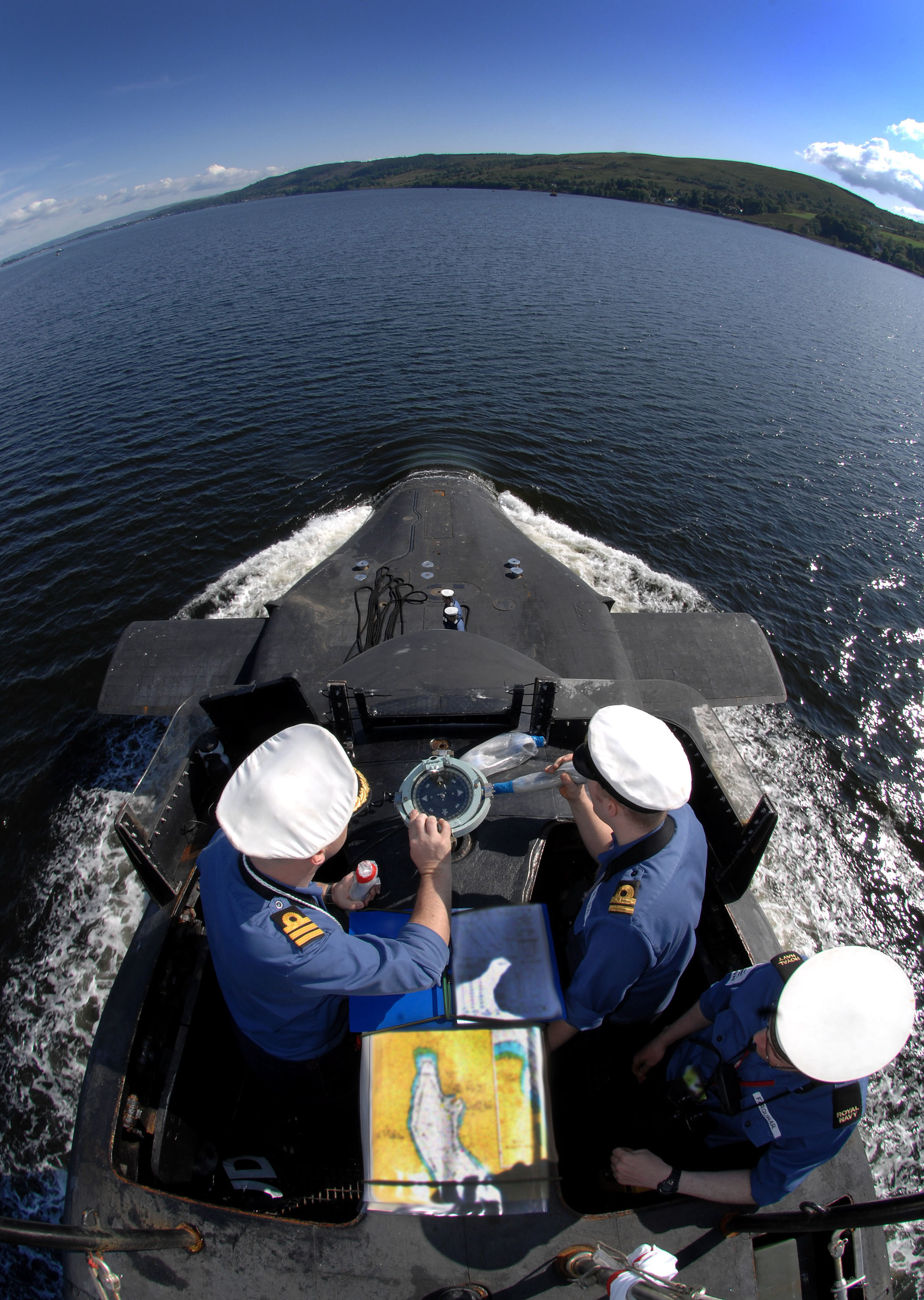
Officer of the watch aboard HMS Vanguard

=== Royal United Services Institute ===
The Royal United Services Institute (RUSI), a British defence and security think tank, released a paper in July 2010 assessing four possible options for maintaining both an effective nuclear deterrent and also reducing costs in light of anticipated budget restrictions. These proposals were motivated by the fact that funding for the Trident renewal programme now had to come from the core Ministry of Defence budget. Four alternatives were considered: Trident submarines on continuous patrol; Trident submarines not on patrol continuously; attack submarines armed with nuclear cruise missiles; and land-based nuclear weapons. The paper concluded that "given the opportunity costs for conventional capabilities that current plans for Trident renewal are due to incur over the next decade...there is now a growing case for a re-examination of whether there are less expensive means of pursuing this objective. A key element of such a review is likely to be a reconsideration of the need to maintain a commitment to CASD in strategic circumstances that are now very different from those in which it was first introduced."

=== Trident Alternatives Review ===
The 2013 Trident Alternatives Review was an 18-month study led by the Cabinet Office that was aimed at establishing whether or not there were credible alternatives to the UK's submarine-based CASD. Accordingly, the review analysed a range of delivery systems and warhead designs with respect to their affordability and effectiveness against potential targets. Ultimately, the Trident Alternatives Review came to the conclusion that there were alternatives to Trident that "would enable the UK to be capable of inflicting significant damage such that most potential adversaries around the world would be deterred", but none would "offer the same degree of resilience as the current posture". The review asserted that whether or not cruise missile-based systems offer a credible alternative was contingent upon a political judgement on whether the UK could accept a "significant increase in vulnerability" and a reduction in who it could deter.

The publication of the report was met with a mixed reception from different political parties and non-governmental organisations (NGOs) in the field of non-proliferation and disarmament. While it was welcomed by the prime minister, David Cameron, as having confirmed the necessity of like-for-like replacement of Trident, Liberal Democrat cabinet minister Danny Alexander deemed it a demonstration of the fact there are "credible and viable alternatives to the UK's current approach to nuclear deterrence." NGOs including the British American Security Information Council (BASIC), a non-proliferation and disarmament think-tank, criticised the report for its limited scope and its failure to engage with a wider array of considerations related to nuclear weapons, including environmental and humanitarian issues.

=== The Trident Commission ===
In 2011, BASIC launched an independent cross-party Commission to initiate a deeper national debate on the UK's nuclear weapons policy and examine questions around the contentious issue of Trident renewal. The Commission operated under the chairmanship of former Labour Secretary of State for Defence, Lord Browne of Ladyton; former Conservative Defence and Foreign Secretary, Sir Malcolm Rifkind; and Sir Menzies Campbell, former leader of the Liberal Democrats and Shadow Foreign Secretary. After three years' of deliberation, the Commission released its final report on 1 July 2014. It suggested, with important caveats, that the UK should retain a nuclear deterrent. The conclusion acknowledged that "it remains crucial that the UK show keen regard for its position within the international community and for the shared responsibility to achieve progress in global nuclear disarmament."

BASIC's interpretation of the report also focused on this point, emphasising that the commissioners "agreed that the health of the global strategic environment, particularly nuclear non-proliferation, is critical to national security and is a central consideration. They talk of the need for Britain to maintain its 'glide path down towards disarmament', to ensure that the renewal decisions the next government will be taking have consistency with the trajectory set by successive recent governments, and that the UK should continue to be 'at the forefront of the multilateral disarmament process.'"

== Renewal ==
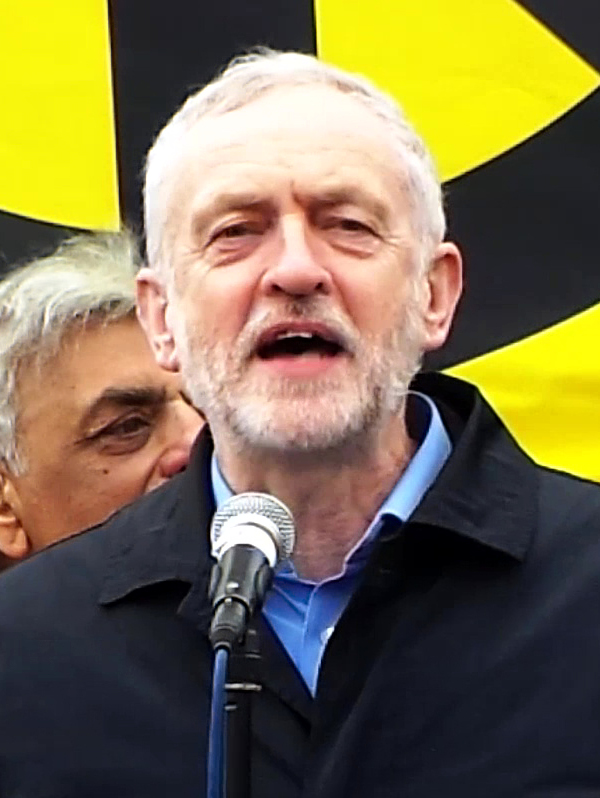
Former Leader of the Opposition, Jeremy Corbyn speaks at the #StopTrident rally at Trafalgar Square on 27 February 2016

=== 2006 Defence White Paper ===
The Vanguard-class submarines were built with a 25-year life expectancy, taking them into the 2020s. Trident II D-5 missiles are expected to continue in service until at least 2040 following an upgrade. A December 2006 Ministry of Defence white paper, entitled "The Future of the United Kingdom's Nuclear Deterrent", recommended that the nuclear weapons should be maintained and outlined measures that would do so until the 2040s. It advocated the currently preferred submarine-based system, as it remained the cheapest and most secure deterrence option available. Costs for this option are estimated at £15–20 billion based on:

- £0.25 billion to participate in US Trident D-5 missile life extension programme.
- £11–14 billion for a class of four new SSBNs.
- £2–3 billion for refurbishing warheads.
- £2–3 billion for infrastructure.

These 2006/07 prices would equate to about £25bn for the Successor-class submarines as they were provisionally named; the 2011 Initial Gate report confirmed estimates of £2-3bn each for the warheads and infrastructure. These cost estimates exclude the Vanguard five-year life extension and decommissioning, and it is unclear if new Trident missiles will need to be purchased for the life extension programme. Running costs would be about £1.5 billion per year at 2006 prices. The paper suggested parts of the existing Trident system be refitted to some extent to prolong their lives. However, the relatively short (five years) life extension potential of the Vanguard class meant that a new class of SSBNs should replace it in the 2020s. The first boat of the new SSBN class would take 17 years to be designed and built, making a five-year life extension of the Vanguard class necessary.

=== Parliamentary support ===
A decision on the renewal of Trident was made on 4 December 2006. Prime Minister Tony Blair told MPs it would be "unwise and dangerous" for the UK to give up its nuclear weapons. He outlined plans to spend up to £20bn on a new generation of submarines for Trident missiles. He said submarine numbers may be cut from four to three, while the number of nuclear warheads would be cut by 20% to 160. Blair said although the Cold War had ended, the UK needed nuclear weapons, as no-one could be sure another nuclear threat would not emerge in the future.

On 14 March 2007, the Labour government won House of Commons support for the plans to renew the submarine system. The proposals were passed by a majority of 248. Despite a clarification that the vote was just for the concept stage of the new system, 95 Labour MPs rebelled, and it was only passed with the support of the opposition Conservative Party. It was the first time MPs had been given the chance to vote on whether the UK should remain a nuclear power, and the biggest rebellion since the beginning of the 2003 Iraq War.

The Labour government proposed that the final decision to manufacture should be made in 2014. The new 2010 coalition government agreed "that the renewal of Trident should be scrutinised to ensure value for money." Research and development work continued with an Initial Gate procurement decision, but the Main Gate decision to manufacture a replacement was rescheduled for 2016, following the 2015 general election. (Note: The business case presented at Initial Gate includes the programme plan and costing for the procurement. The Main Gate business case is a key deliverable from the assessment stage. The process and products are similar to those used at Initial Gate but with a higher degree of maturity expected at this stage to inform the decision on whether or not to proceed with procurement.) The vote on whether to order the Successor-class was held on 18 July 2016 in the House of Commons; the motion passed with a significant majority, extending the programme's life until at least the 2060s. Although 48 Labour MPs voted against it, 41 did not vote, and 140 Labour votes were cast in favour of the motion.

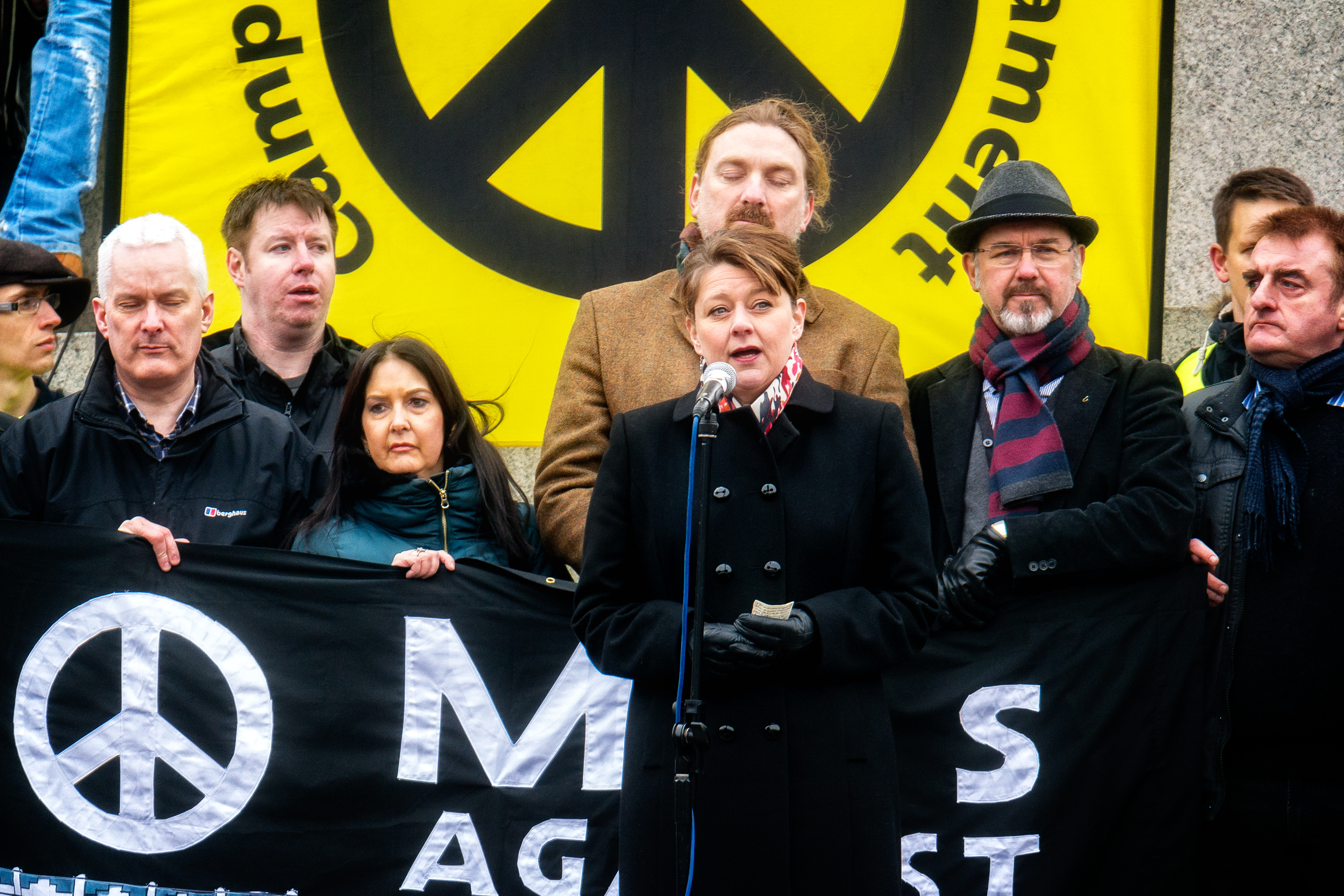
Leanne Wood speaks at the #StopTrident rally on 27 February 2016. She was arrested on 8 January 2007 for protesting against the UK's Trident nuclear missile programme at Faslane.

=== 2010 Strategic Defence and Security Review ===
The 2010 Strategic Defence and Security Review concluded that the Successor-class submarines would have eight operational missiles carrying no more than 40 operational warheads between them. This would allow the UK to reduce its stocks of operational warheads from 160 to 120, and the overall stockpile from no more than 225 to no more than 180. They would be carried in a 12-missile Common Missile Compartment designed in collaboration with the US which could accommodate the current Trident II D-5 missiles and any replacement missile once the D-5 reaches the end of its expected life in the 2040s.

=== Expert opinion ===
Two non-representative polls of experts from the RUSI and the Royal Institute of International Affairs (commonly known as Chatham House) were conducted in 2010. The RUSI found a majority for those who think the benefits of Trident outweigh the costs (53%) compared to those that think the costs outweigh the benefits (13%) or are evenly balanced (34%). The Chatham House poll found a minority in favour of Trident replacement (22%), with more in favour of replacing with a cheaper system (43%) and 29% saying the UK should not replace Trident at all.

=== Public opinion ===
In April 2015, a YouGov poll found that 38% of people thought that Trident should be replaced in full, 28% wanted to replace it with a cheaper system, 19% thought the UK should completely give up its nuclear weapons, and 15% did not know. In September 2015, a Survation poll found that 29% agreed that Trident should be reformed to make it cheaper, 26% that it should be renewed in full, and 18% that it should be scrapped. 27% did not know. Nuclear weapons are not the nation's biggest issue, with just 2% of people saying that it was the nation's biggest worry in May 2015, compared to 21% in June 1987.

Public support for replacing the Trident system rose substantially following the Russian invasion of Ukraine: a YouGov poll found that support for replacing Trident with an equally-powerful missile system rose from 34% in September 2021 to 45% in March 2022, while support for complete nuclear disarmament fell from 23% to 18% in the same period. By June 2025, support for replacing Trident had risen to 50%, and support for total disarmament had fallen to 12%.

=== Dreadnought-class submarine ===
In February 2016, BAE Systems began design work on prototypes of the new submarines. The Successor class was officially named the Dreadnought class on 21 October 2016. The submarines were expected to become operational starting in 2028, with the current fleet phased out by 2032.

In October 2015, Reuters estimated it would cost £167 billion over its 30-year lifespan, or £5.56 billion per year; this figure was disputed by Michael Fallon. The Ministry of Defence put the cost of building, testing and commissioning the replacement vessels at £31 billion (plus a contingency fund of £10 billion) over 35 years. This amounts to 0.2 per cent of government spending, or 6 per cent of defence spending. Crispin Blunt, Chair of the Foreign Affairs Select Committee, estimated in July 2016 that the programme would cost £179 billion in total over its lifetime.

For the 2018/19 financial year the National Audit Office found that spending on the nuclear deterrent will cost £5.2 billion, or 14% of the defence budget, with £600 million of contingency funding used. Costs were projected at about £51 billion over the following 10 years, £2.9 billion above the projected budget which already anticipated finding £3 billion of savings, which the Daily Telegraph described as a £6 billion shortfall.

In July 2026, the Government announced that as part of the 2026 Defence Investment Plan £63.6 billion would be spent over four years in what called the Nuclear Defence Enterprise, the bulk of which would go on keeping the nuclear submarines in operation.

== See also ==
- Defence Nuclear Enterprise
- Armed forces in Scotland
- Military history of Scotland
