= Defence Nuclear Organisation =

Government agency in the United Kingdom

Agency overview
- Formed: 2016
- Jurisdiction: United Kingdom
- Headquarters: MoD Main Building, Whitehall
- Employees: Over 450
- Minister responsible: Luke Pollard MP, Minister of State for Defence Readiness and Industry
- Agency executive: Madelaine McTernan, Chief of Defence Nuclear
- Parent agency: Ministry of Defence
- Website: www.gov.uk/government/organisations/defence-nuclear-organisation

The Defence Nuclear Organisation (DNO) is one of the seven top level budget holders within the United Kingdom's Ministry of Defence (MOD). The organisation was formed in 2016, in order to oversee the MOD's nuclear enterprise.

Staff are primarily based at the organisation's headquarters in the MOD Main Building in Whitehall, with over 300 staff also based at MOD Abbey Wood in Bristol, RNAD Coulport in Argyll, and the Atomic Weapons Establishment near Reading.

== Functions ==
The Defence Nuclear Organisation primarily serves to oversee the Ministry of Defence's Defence Nuclear Enterprise, which in particular provides the United Kingdom's continuous at sea deterrent.

== Defence Nuclear Enterprise ==
The Defence Nuclear Enterprise (DNE) consists of the Submarine Delivery Agency, the Atomic Weapons Establishment, the nuclear-related costs of parts of the Military Strategic Headquarters particularly in the Royal Navy, together with the main industrial partner companies including BAE Systems Submarines, Rolls-Royce Submarines and Babcock International which build and maintain the submarines. This includes, the scientific research surrounding the nuclear program, the delivery of nuclear warheads, providing appropriate infrastructure for the program, and disposing of nuclear assets.

About 20% of the MOD budget was spent on the DNE in 2025–26, as a ring-fenced budget, with a projection that this proportion will continue to increase to between 20% and 25% of the MOD budget.

The nine most costly DNE programmes, each of which has a whole-life cost exceeding £10 billion, are:

- Astute-class submarines
- SSN-AUKUS
- Astraea nuclear warhead
- Dreadnought-class submarines
- Future Materials Campus at Atomic Weapons Establishment Aldermaston
- HMNB Clyde Transformation Programme
- Nuclear Core Production Capability at Rolls-Royce Submarines in Raynesway, Derby
- Nuclear Fuels Programme (in early development phase)
- Submarine Build Modernisation at BAE Systems Submarines

In 2024, a Public Accounts Committee report on sound financial practice identified a gap in parliamentary scrutiny of the Defence Nuclear Enterprise. The government responded in 2026, suggesting the establishment of a new House of Commons Committee to conduct scrutiny of DNE expenditure and programmes. Given the classified nature of this topic, the committee would be appointed by the prime minister and report substantive findings privately to the prime minister and defence secretary only.
