= Nuclear Accident Response Organisation =

UK Government coordination of an emergency involving defence nuclear assets

HQ Defence Nuclear Emergency Operations (DNEO) is maintained by the UK Ministry of Defence (MOD) to respond to an accident or incident, including one arising through terrorist acts, involving defence nuclear assets.

Defence Nuclear Assets include:

- Naval Nuclear Reactors; to include all operational Royal Navy submarine reactors
- Defence nuclear reactor fuel
- Nuclear Weapons and radioactive components
- Radioactive material on defence nuclear sites, which warrants implementation of the site emergency arrangements

The aim of the HQ DNEO is to ensure an effective UK Government level response to a defence nuclear emergency. The primary emergency response is led at regional level by Emergency Services under JESIP arrangements. The key objective is to protect the public, the environment and the economy.

The MOD has two key responsibilities in the maintenance and provision of a nuclear accident response capability in the event of a defence nuclear accident:

- The MOD has executive responsibilities for the safe operation of its nuclear programmes and for the post accident render safe and recovery operations
- The MOD, through HQ DNEO, is nominated by the Cabinet Office as the UK Lead Government Department to coordinate the Central Government response to a Defence Nuclear Accident, and for liaison with the Devolved Administrations as appropriate (The Central Government arrangements for Civil and Defence Nuclear Emergency resilience are coordinated through the Nuclear Resilience Coordination Committee, NRCC chaired by DESNZ and MOD)

The HQ DNEO comprises civilian and military personnel from DNO and across the MOD, who provide a wide range of skills and expertise, including: nuclear safety, radiological monitoring, command and control, mapping, information management and security.

The MOD conducts a regular series of exercises, involving local authorities, local emergency services and agencies across government, in order to ensure the effectiveness of the nuclear accident emergency plans. In the unlikely event of a defence nuclear accident, the MOD would support the emergency services and local authorities as appropriate.
