= RNAD Coulport =

UK nuclear warhead storage depot in Argyll, Scotland

RNAD Coulport
- Part of HMNB Clyde
- Loch Long, Argyll in Scotland
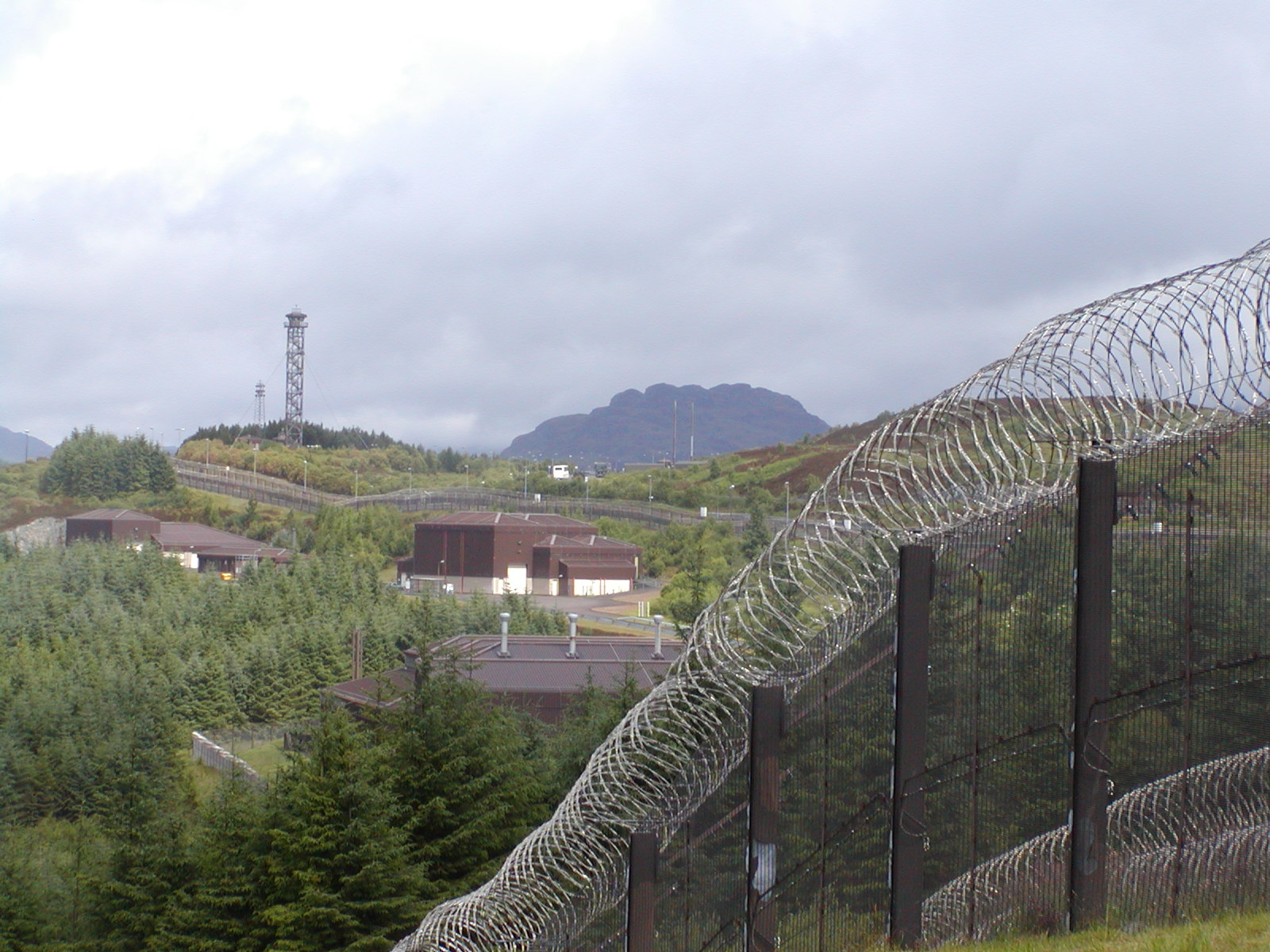
- Perimeter fence and buildings at RNAD Coulport

Site information
- Type: Nuclear weapons storage and supply depot
- Owner: Ministry of Defence (Defence Equipment and Support)
- Operator: ABL Alliance (AWE, Babcock and Lockheed Martin UK)
- Controlled by: Naval Base Commander, Clyde
- Condition: Operational

Location
- Location in Argyll and Bute
- Coordinates: 56°3′0″N 4°52′48″W
- Area: 648 hectares (1,600 acres)

Site history
- Built: 1963–1968
- In use: 1968 – present

Royal Naval Armaments Depot Coulport, shortened to RNAD Coulport, on Loch Long in Argyll, Scotland, is the storage and loading facility for the nuclear warheads of the United Kingdom's Trident programme.

The base, near the village of Coulport, has up to 16 reinforced concrete bunkers built into the hillside on the eastern shore of Loch Long. It is the last depot in Britain to retain the "RNAD" designation, indicating a Royal Naval Armaments Depot.

The depot was established during the Cold War as the storage, maintenance and loading facility for Polaris nuclear weapons. Today, Coulport is mainly used for handling Trident warheads.

Two docks are located on the shoreline at the foot of the hill. There, weapons are loaded onto Vanguard-class nuclear submarines before they go on patrol and unloaded before they return to base at nearby Faslane. An older jetty is known as the Polaris Jetty, while the newer, covered explosive handling jetty (EHJ) is used for handling Trident warheads.

== History ==
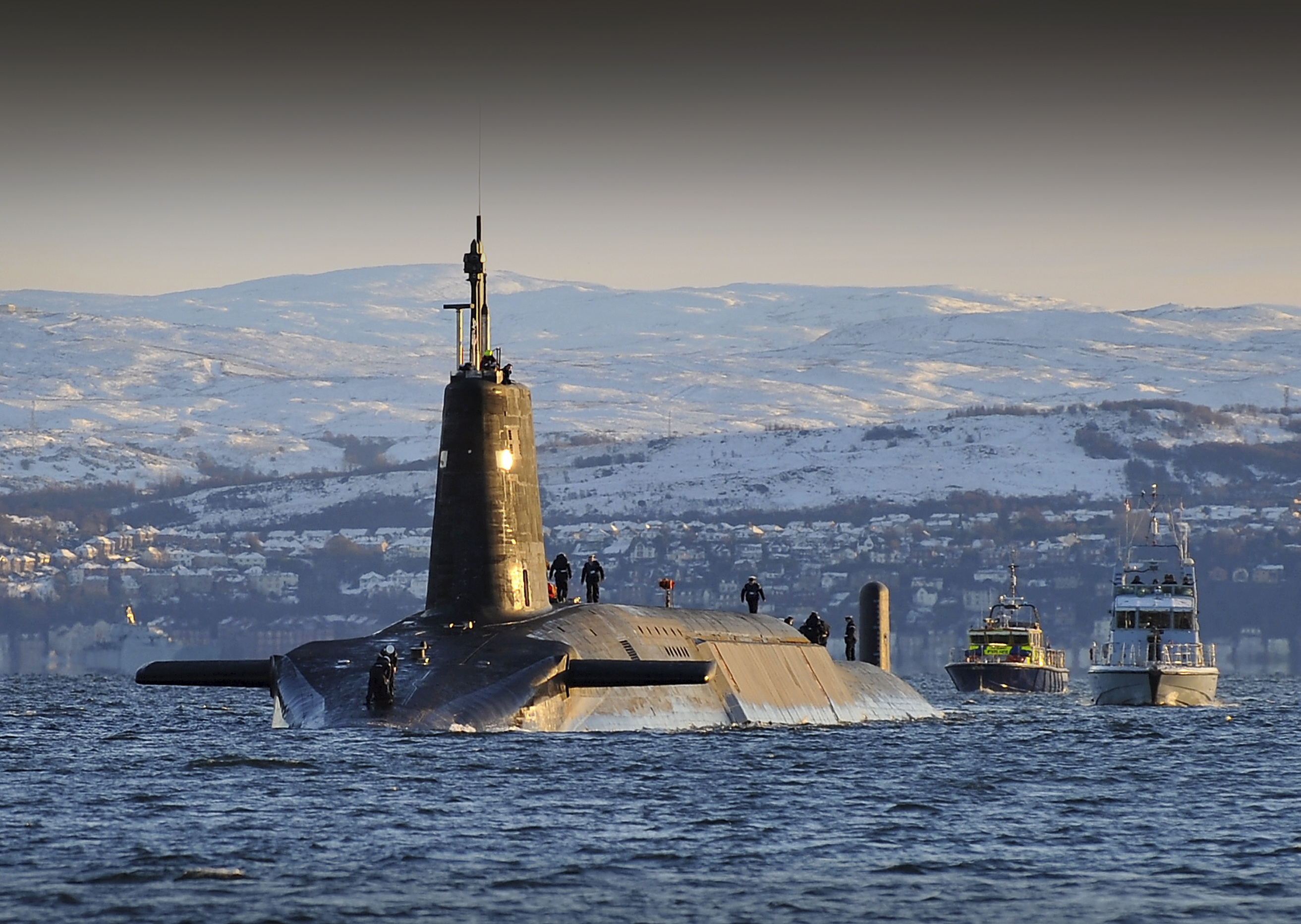
Submarine returning from patrol

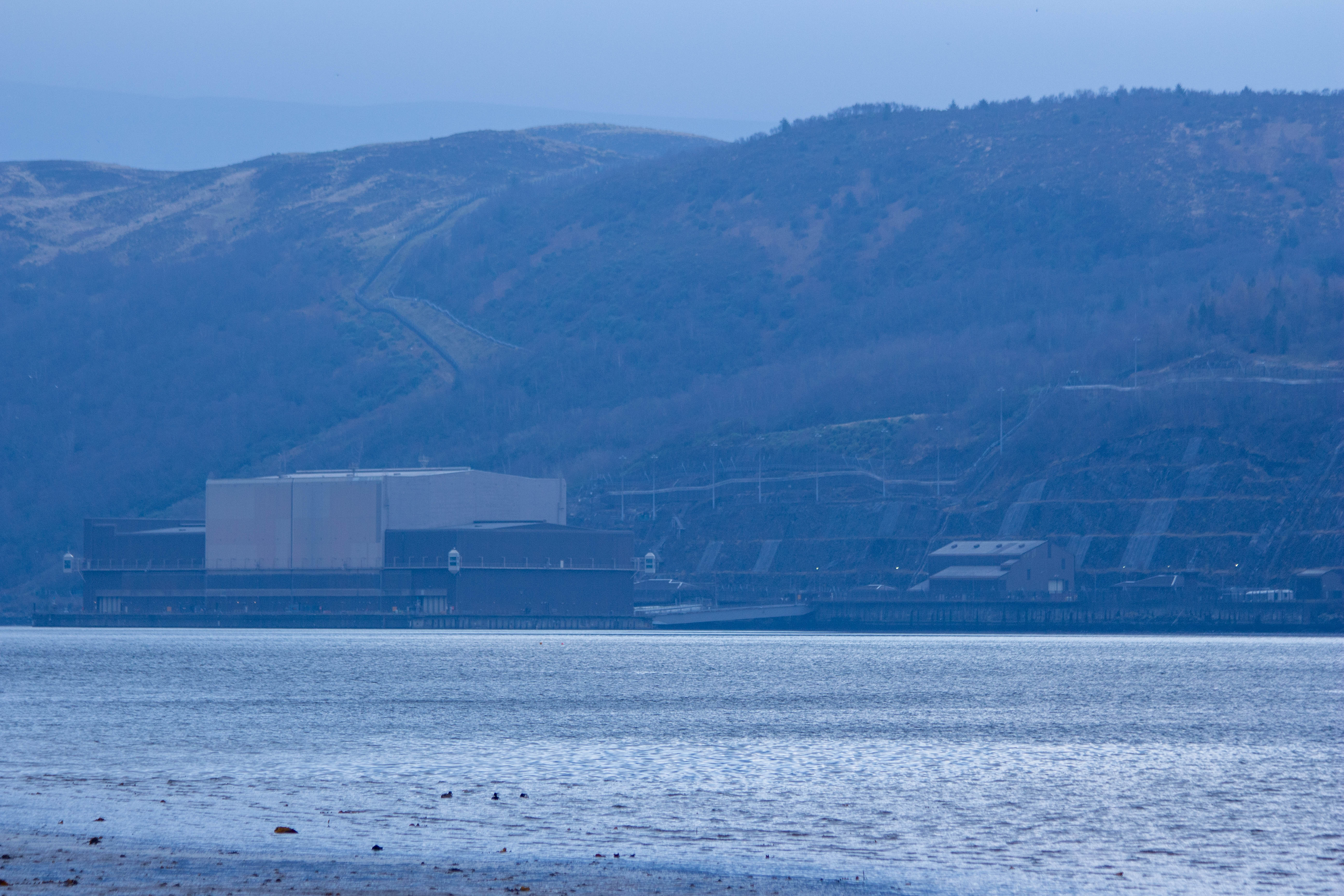
The explosive handling jetty at Coulport, seen from Ardentinny

Coulport had originally been best known as a holiday retreat for wealthy Glaswegians, with its most notable feature being Kibble Palace, now relocated to the Glasgow Botanic Gardens. It is the site of the farm of Duchlage (historically spelt Duchlass).

The Nassau Agreement was signed in December 1962, and the Polaris Sales Agreement was signed in April 1963. Initial construction took place between 1963, when Faslane was chosen as the new Polaris base, and 1968, when the first Polaris boat began its patrol. Safety considerations required that the armament maintenance and the storage facility have its own berth and be at least 4,400 feet (1,300 m) from the main facility whilst operational considerations dictated that the two facilities should be within an hour's sailing time. Coulport, on the opposite peninsula, met both of these requirements.

The Trident Works Programme at Coulport and Faslane, co-ordinated by the Property Services Agency, took 13 years to complete. Planning work at Coulport began in 1982, and the estimated final cost for the entire programme, at 1994 prices, was approximately £1.9 billion. This made it the second most expensive procurement project in the UK after the Channel Tunnel project.

Before the 2014 Scottish independence referendum, the implications of a potential vote for Scottish independence from the United Kingdom for the Coulport and Faslane bases were extensively discussed in the media, as it was unclear if any submarine base in England, Wales or Northern Ireland could house the Coulport silos. Since the Scottish electorate voted against independence, Scotland remained UK territory and so the bases, and the equipment housed there, were unaffected.

A covered floating dry dock for the Trident submarines was built at Hunterston in Ayrshire, and floated to RNAD Coulport where it has been situated since 1993. This explosive handling jetty is one of the world's largest floating concrete structures.

From about 2010 to 2025, due to inadequate maintenance of 1,500 water pipes, some tritium used periodically to replenish the Trident nuclear weapons leaked into Loch Long, constituting a low level of radioactive pollution. Analysis by Scottish Environment Protection Agency suggested that up to half of the pipeline components were beyond their design life when the leaks occurred.

== Sister depot at Kings Bay, Georgia ==
The UK's Polaris system was fully serviced at Coulport, but the Trident missiles are randomly selected from the large US stockpile at the Trident Refit Facility at the Naval Submarine Base Kings Bay, Georgia. The missiles are not owned outright by the UK, which has "mingled asset" ownership rights to 58 missiles from a pool shared with the US Navy. The Trident warheads are designed and manufactured by the Atomic Weapons Establishment at Aldermaston, Berkshire, England, and are owned by the UK government.

== Site management ==
RNAD Coulport is owned by the Ministry of Defence (MOD) and is one of four Atomic Weapons Establishment (AWE) sites. Under a fifteen-year contract agreed in 2012, AWE plc, Babcock and Lockheed Martin UK Strategic Systems, together known as the ABL Alliance, manage and operate Coulport, although the Royal Navy's Naval Base Commander Clyde retains overall control and responsibility for security and activities. The site is regulated by the Office for Nuclear Regulation and Defence Nuclear Safety Regulator.

== Safety ==
Exercise Bowline is the annual test of the emergency response routines to a nuclear weapon accident at Coulport. It is conducted by the Office for Nuclear Regulation. In 2011 the test failed as "a number of command and control aspects of the exercise were not considered to have been adequately demonstrated".

The exercise was repeated later in the year and recorded "a marked improvement" and that "the agreed objectives and associated success criteria of the 'Command and Control' aspects were met."

== Transport of Trident nuclear warheads by road ==
The main logistical movement of nuclear weapons in the UK is between the Atomic Weapons Establishment in Berkshire and RNAD Coulport in Argyll, in both directions. Because the warheads need to be regularly refurbished, batches are shuttled by road convoy several times a year. Convoys use staging posts and crew change locations during this journey.

The Truck Cargo Heavy Duty (TCHD) carriers containing the weapons are escorted in a convoy of MoD vehicles commanded by a Ministry of Defence Police (MDP) Chief Inspector. The crew, of up to 50 people, includes a first aid team, fire crew and personnel equipped to monitor for radiological hazards. The convoy maintains contact by radio and telephone with Task Control, MDP Central Control Room, Wethersfield, Essex, which monitors its movement, and with the civil police forces in the affected areas.

Police forces are notified at least 24 hours in advance of a convoy being routed through their area; this enables them to advise the convoy about any local traffic problems. Police forces may advise fire brigades of the presence of the convoy if it is moving into the vicinity of a fire brigade operation.

Details of nuclear warhead convoys are kept secret by the UK government and the MoD who operate a "Neither Confirm Nor Deny" policy on informing the public regarding convoys. Evidence given by the Nuclear Information Campaign to the Defence Select Committee (based on figures from campaign group Nukewatch UK for 2000 to 2006) give the number of convoys as ranging from two to six return journeys per year from Aldermaston to Coulport. Estimates of the warhead numbers transported during this period are that 88 were moved from Aldermaston to Coulport while 120 were returned, indicating a withdrawal of between 30 and 50 warheads leaving an operational stockpile of between 170 and 150 warheads.

In the event of a nuclear accident the SSC would activate the MoD's Nuclear Accident Response Organisation and would alert the local police. The responsibility for these operations rests with the Director Nuclear Movements & Nuclear Accident Response Group.

Protesters regularly try to stop the convoy and climb onto the TCHDs. The MDP are trained on a regular basis to counter any protest. MDP motorcyclists and traffic car officers make arrests and then hand over responsibility to the local police.

== See also ==
- 1958 US–UK Mutual Defence Agreement
- British replacement of the Trident system
- DM Glen Douglas
- Nuclear weapons and the United Kingdom
- Scottish Campaign for Nuclear Disarmament
- Special Relationship
- UGM-27 Polaris
- Armed forces in Scotland
- Military history of Scotland
