= AWE Nuclear Security Technologies =

UK Ministry of Defence facility

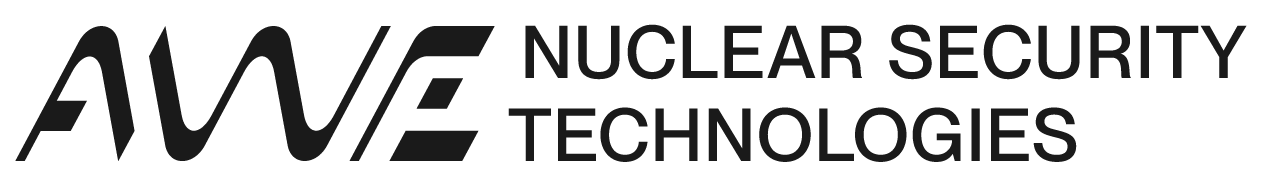

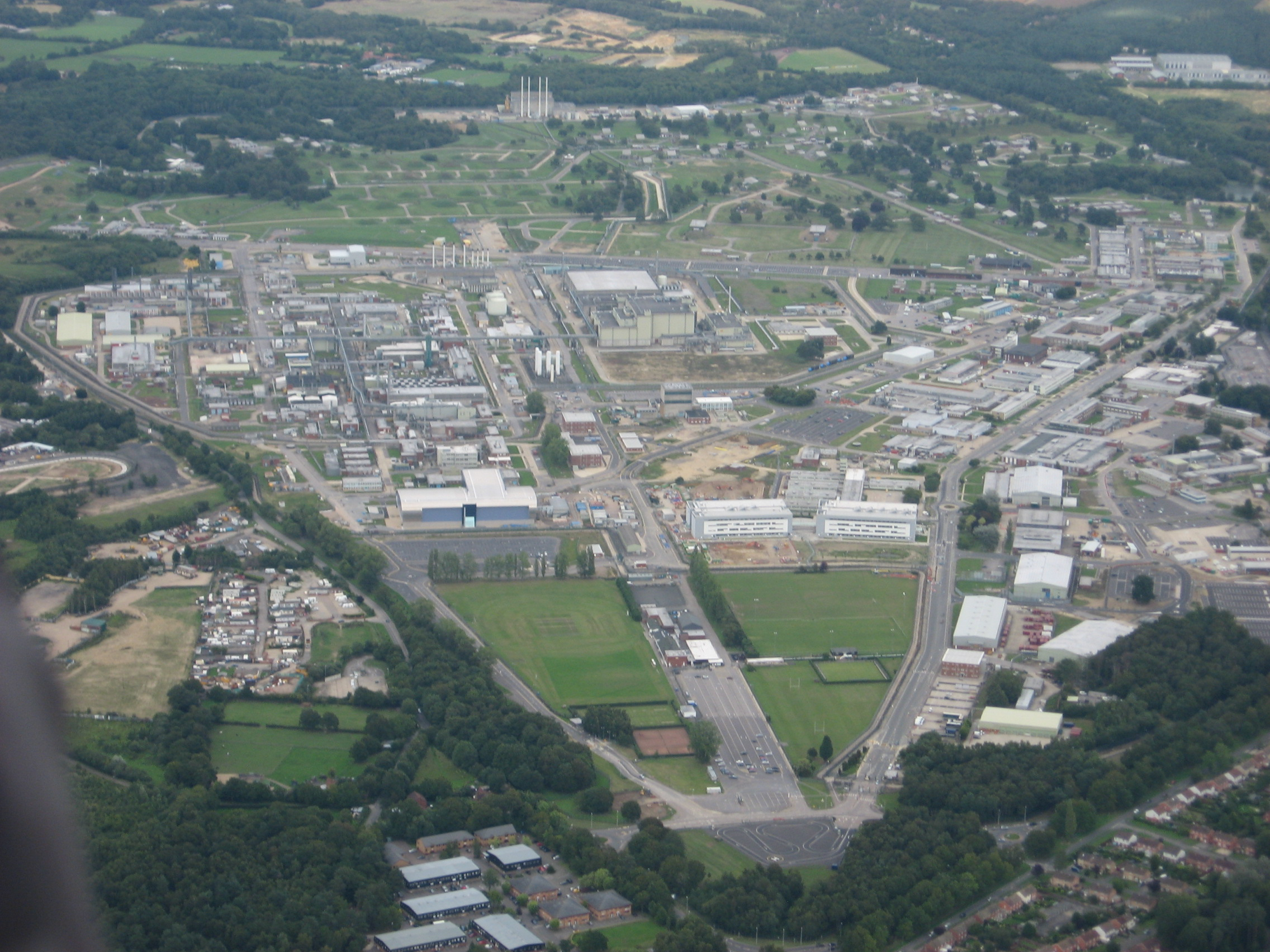
- Aerial view of AWE Aldermaston, 2009

Non-departmental public body overview
- Formed: 1987; 39 years ago
- Preceding agencies: Atomic Weapons Research Establishment (AWRE); Royal Ordnance Factories (ROF) Burghfield and Cardiff
- Jurisdiction: United Kingdom
- Headquarters: Aldermaston, England, UK; 51°22′09.3″N 1°08′25.9″W
- Non-departmental public body executives: Sir John Manzoni, chairman; Nick Elliot, chief executive
- Parent department: Ministry of Defence
- Website: www.awe.co.uk (Main website); www.gov.uk/government/organisations/atomic-weapons-establishment (GOV.UK webpage)

AWE Nuclear Security Technologies, formerly known as the Atomic Weapons Establishment (AWE), is a United Kingdom Ministry of Defence (MoD) research facility responsible for the design, manufacture and support of warheads for the UK's nuclear weapons. It is the successor to the Atomic Weapons Research Establishment (AWRE) with its main site on the former RAF Aldermaston and has major facilities at Burghfield, Blacknest and RNAD Coulport.

AWE plc, responsible for the day-to-day operations of AWE, is owned by the Ministry of Defence and operated as a non-departmental public body.

Until June 2021, AWE plc was owned by a consortium of Jacobs Engineering Group, Lockheed Martin UK, and Serco through AWE Management Ltd, which held a 25‑year contract (until March 2025) to operate AWE, although all the sites remained owned by the Government of the United Kingdom which had a golden share in AWE plc. In November 2020, it was announced that the MoD had triggered a contractual break point and would take ownership of AWE Plc in July 2021.

The establishment is the final destination for the Campaign for Nuclear Disarmament's Aldermaston Marches from Trafalgar Square, London. The first march was conceived by the Direct Action Committee and took place in 1958.

== History ==
=== UK Programme and the Atomic Weapons Research Establishment ===
The British nuclear weapons programme, then operating under the project name High Explosive Research (HER) within the Ministry of Supply, established operations on 1 April 1950 at the former RAF Aldermaston airfield. However, the starting point of the overall programme was the MAUD Committee in the early 1940s, just two years after Meitner, Hahn and Strassmann confirmed the nuclear fission reaction in Berlin. The UK soon joined forces with the US as part of the Manhattan Project, establishing early nuclear research alongside Canada at Chalk River. Shortly after Nazi Germany was defeated, the former Foreign Secretary Ernest Bevin was quoted as saying:

We have got to have this thing over here, whatever it costs... we have got to have a bloody Union Jack on top of it...

— Ernest Bevin (c. 1946)

The site for the new AWE was to be an airfield. The airfield was constructed in World War II and had been used by the Royal Air Force (RAF) and the United States's Eighth and Ninth Air Force as a troop carrier (C‑47) group base, and was assigned USAAF station No 467. In 1952, the HER project was renamed the Atomic Weapons Research Establishment (AWRE), with William Penney appointed as the first director.

=== Changes in ownership ===
In 1954 AWRE was transferred to the newly created United Kingdom Atomic Energy Authority (UKAEA). In 1971, under the provisions of the Atomic Energy Authority Act 1971, the production activities of UKAEA were transferred to the newly created British Nuclear Fuels Ltd. (BNFL).

In 1973 AWRE was transferred to the Procurement Executive of the Ministry of Defence as part of the Atomic Energy Authority (Weapons Group) Act 1973. Parts of AWRE's weapons production processes were carried out at two Royal Ordnance Factories (ROFs): ROF Burghfield and ROF Cardiff. In 1984 these two ROFs were separated from the other ROFs, which were then formed into a government-owned defence company, Royal Ordnance plc and was privatised in 1987. ROF Burghfield and ROF Cardiff remained within the Procurement Executive and came under the control of AWRE.

=== The formation of AWE ===
In 1987, AWRE was combined with ROF Burghfield and ROF Cardiff to form the Atomic Weapons Establishment (AWE), these sites being renamed AWE Burghfield and AWE Cardiff (the latter was closed in 1997).

It remained with the Ministry of Defence, Procurement Executive. However, in 1989, the UK government announced its intention to find a suitable private company to run AWE under a Government Owned/Contractor Operated (GO‑CO) arrangement.

=== Private management ===
In 1993, the government awarded a contract to Hunting-BRAE, a consortium of Hunting Engineering, Brown and Root and AEA Technology. During Hunting-BRAE's management AWE decommissioned the RAF's WE177 freefall nuclear bomb. In 1998 the company suffered two prosecutions for safety breaches, one for discharge of tritium into a nearby stream and another for an incident where two workers inhaled plutonium.

In 1999 Hunting-BRAE lost the contract to AWE Management Ltd (AWE ML), a consortium of BNFL, Lockheed Martin and Serco. AWE ML's subsidiary, AWE plc, assumed responsibility for the operation of all AWE sites on 1 April 2000. This was not full privatisation as the MoD continued to own all the AWE sites as well as a golden share in AWE plc.

Critics pointed out that BNFL and Lockheed Martin did not have perfect safety records either. BNFL suffered embarrassing revelations of falsified quality checks in nuclear fuels and Lockheed was the subject of scathing reports on the operation of US nuclear facilities. Lockheed's failings included safety concerns at the Y-12 facility at Oak Ridge, Tennessee, an American weapons plant similar in certain ways to Aldermaston.

During the 2007 United Kingdom floods, the flood waters affected AWE Burghfield resulting in a suspension of work there on nuclear warhead refurbishment for almost a year.

In December 2008, the BNFL share in AWE Management Ltd was sold to Jacobs Engineering Group, an American engineering services company.

Since about 2013 the Office for Nuclear Regulation (ONR) has given both AWE sites enhanced regulatory attention due to "safety and compliance concerns, and the continued undertaking of operations in ageing facilities due to delays to the delivery of modern standard replacement facilities." The ONR anticipated AWE would move back to normal regulatory attention in 2021 after the new facilities are completed.

Scientists at AWE were involved in testing for radioactive poison after the poisoning of Alexander Litvinenko. No gamma rays were detected; however, the BBC reported that a scientist at AWE, who had worked on Britain's early atomic bomb programme decades before, recognised a small spike at an energy of 803 kilo-electron volts (keV) as the gamma ray signal from polonium-210, a critical component of early nuclear bombs, which led to the correct diagnosis. Further tests using spectroscopy designed to detect alpha radiation confirmed the result.

In July 2015 the ONR issued an improvement notice to AWE demanding that it demonstrate that it has a long-term strategy for managing Higher Active radioactive Waste in order to reduce the risk to the public and its employees.

In 2011 a project named MENSA to construct a new warhead assembly and disassembly facility at Burghfield had been approved, to be completed in 2017 at a cost £734 million. In 2020, a National Audit Office report found that costs had increased by £1.07 billion to £1.8 billion and completion date had slipped to 2023. Construction was begun before design had been finalised and risk was not shared with contractors, so they were not incentivised to control costs.

=== Return to government management ===
In November 2020, it was announced that the Ministry of Defence had triggered a contractual break point and would take ownership of AWE Plc in July 2021. Sir John Manzoni was announced as chair-designate, and he formally took on the role of chair of the board on 1 July 2021.

As of 2026, a Future Materials Campus is being developed at Aldermaston, which will renew the facilities to manufacture and store nuclear weapons components supporting the next-generation Astraea nuclear warhead; it has a whole-life cost exceeding £10 billion.

== Operations ==
=== AWE's responsibilities ===
AWE is tasked to help the United Kingdom maintain a credible and effective minimum nuclear deterrent:

- To maintain the warheads for the Trident nuclear deterrent safely and reliably in service.
- To maintain a capability to design a new weapon, should it ever be required.
- To complete the dismantling and disposal of redundant warheads replaced by Trident.
- To develop the skills, technologies and techniques that could underpin future arms limitation treaties.

A significant programme of investment took place over the three-year period from 2005 to 2008, of about £350 million per year, to provide assurance that the existing Trident missile warhead is reliable and safe throughout its intended in-service life. The new facilities and extra supporting infrastructure are required in the absence of live nuclear testing no longer allowed under the Comprehensive Test Ban Treaty.

AWE co-operates with the Los Alamos National Laboratory in the United States and other American nuclear weapons laboratories in carrying out subcritical nuclear tests at the Nevada underground test site to obtain scientific data to maintain the safety and reliability of nuclear weapons. Subcritical tests are not banned by the Comprehensive Nuclear-Test-Ban Treaty (CTBT) on nuclear weapons. The most recent test took place in February 2006.

The cost of decommissioning AWE facilities when they become redundant, including nuclear waste disposal, was estimated at £3.4 billion in 2005.

=== Safety record ===
On 3 August 2010, a fire broke out in the explosives processing area at AWE Aldermaston, resulting in the evacuation of nearby residents from their homes. Investigations by a local newspaper revealed that from 1 April 2000, to 5 August 2011, 158 fires broke out at AWE sites, with the fire brigade being called out to deal with alarms on average four times a week over this period. The Health and Safety Executive took the decision to prosecute AWE plc on three charges relating to health and safety after their investigation into the fire in 2010, the first hearing in this case being held on 6 August 2012. On 16 May 2013 AWE pleaded guilty to a single offence contrary to the Health and Safety at Work etc. Act 1974.

=== Security breaches ===
In 2013, a whistleblower alerted the authorities to lapses in security caused by misconduct among police officers guarding the base. The MoD said that security was never threatened, but MoD police considered it a "critical" incident. Six officers were dismissed for gross misconduct and 25 resigned.

== AWE Blacknest ==
Formerly part of the MoD, AWE Blacknest has, for over 60 years, specialised in forensic seismology, researching techniques to distinguish the seismic signals generated by underground nuclear explosions from those generated by earthquakes. It is approximately 1 mile west of the main AWE site.

Blacknest's main function is to develop and maintain expertise in using seismic techniques to detect and identify underground explosions. This expertise and the techniques have been used in the past to provide assessments for the UK government on nuclear explosions carried out by other countries. The expertise is to be used as part of Britain's contribution to the CTBT which was signed in 1996, but which, as of 2025, has not come into force.

== See also ==
- Defence Nuclear Enterprise
- US-UK Mutual Defence Agreement
- Atomic Energy Research Establishment
- Tube Alloys
- Frank Barnaby
- John Dolphin
- Operation Grapple
- William Penney
