= Frank Panton =

Frank Panton CBE
- Born: Francis Harry Panton; 25 May 1923; Lincoln, England
- Died: 8 April 2013 (aged 89); Kent, England
- Education: University of Nottingham
- Occupations: Military scientist; bomb disposal expert; Assistant Chief Science Advisor (Nuclear) to UK government
- Known for: Military intelligence work, development of Chevaline nuclear weapons system, amateur archaeology

Francis Harry "Frank" Panton, CBE (25 May 1923 – 8 April 2013) was a British military scientist, bomb disposal expert, and amateur archaeologist who played a key role in the development of the Chevaline nuclear weapons system during the Cold War. He served as the Assistant Chief Nuclear Science Advisor (ACSAN) to the British government, and was also heavily involved in military intelligence work in Berlin and Washington, DC. Later, as the chairman of the Canterbury Archaeological Trust, he oversaw the discovery and preservation of numerous important archaeological artifacts in his home county of Kent.

== Education and Second World War ==
Panton was born in Lincoln and educated at the Lincoln City School. During the Second World War, he joined the Royal Engineers, serving as a reconnaissance officer in the No. 1 Bomb Disposal Company. In 1948, he was appointed a Member of the Order of the British Empire in recognition of his mine clearance and bomb disposal work. After being demobilised, he went to study chemistry at the University of Nottingham. He became the vice-president of the National Union of Students, and visited the Soviet Union as a guest of state.

== Military intelligence and weapons development work ==
In the early 1950s, Panton was recruited by British military intelligence and was posted to West Berlin, where he attempted to uncover Soviet nuclear secrets by questioning East German refugees at Checkpoint Charlie. From 1958 to 1959, he worked as an intelligence liaison at the British embassy in Washington DC. He also served as a technical advisor at nuclear disarmament talks in Geneva, before returning to Washington in 1963 as the British defence attaché. In 1967, Panton left Washington to become the Assistant Chief Nuclear Science Advisor (ACSAN) at the Ministry of Defence.

=== Chevaline project ===
In 1969, as ACSAN, Panton oversaw the commencement of the Chevaline project – an effort to increase the ability of British Polaris nuclear missiles to penetrate Soviet missile defences. A key feature of Chevaline was its use of multiple decoy warheads and other penetration aids to overwhelm enemy missile-tracking radars, thus guaranteeing that some warheads would reach their targets. Panton was instrumental in obtaining political and financial support for the project, which entered service in 1975 and remained active through the 1980s.

=== Later research and development work ===
In the 1970s and early 1980s, Panton was in charge of several advanced military research and development organisations, including the Royal Armament Research and Development Establishment (RARDE) at Fort Halstead, Sevenoaks. Among his projects during this period was the upgrading of the Wheelbarrow bomb disposal robot for use by British soldiers in Northern Ireland. Panton retired from the Ministry of Defence in 1984, but remained a prominent technical consultant to the British government before fully retiring in 1999.

== Archaeological work ==
Panton moved to Kent in the 1980s, and became the chairman of the Canterbury Archaeological Trust. Before his retirement from the Trust in 2000, he oversaw the discovery and preservation of several important artefacts, including a Bronze Age boat which was unearthed in Dover in 1992, and the remnants of an Anglo-Saxon church which were found beneath Canterbury Cathedral in 1994. He also contributed prolifically to the journal of the Kent Archaeological Society, Archaeologia Cantiana.

== Personal life ==
In 1952, Panton married Audrey Lane, with whom he had two sons. In 1995, following Lane's death, Panton married Pauline Dean, who survived him. Panton died in April 2013 at the age of 89.
