= Polaris (UK nuclear programme) =

1968–1996 British nuclear weapons programme

United Kingdom Polaris programme
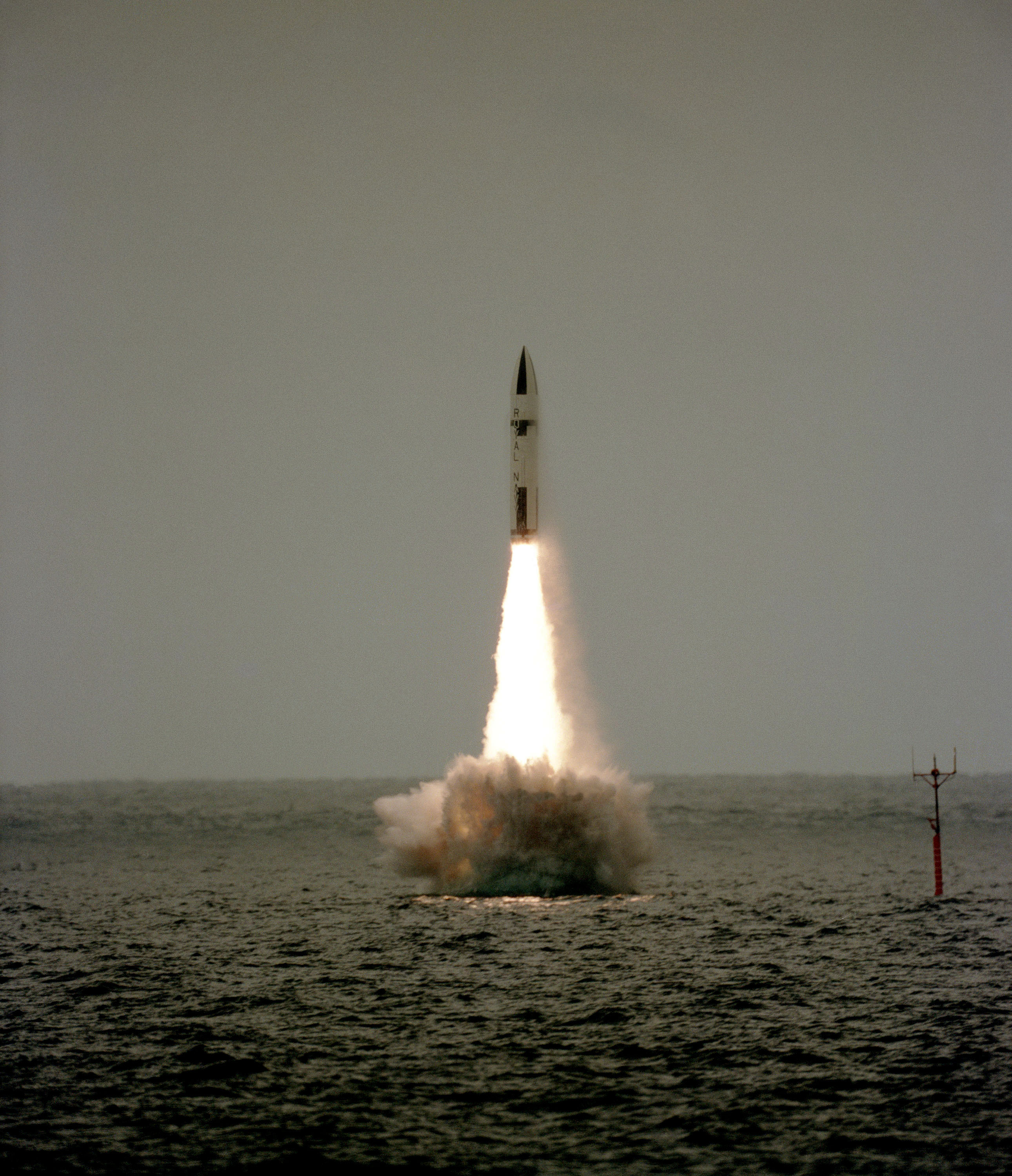
- A Polaris missile is fired from the submerged ballistic missile submarine HMS Revenge
- Type of project: Deployment of Polaris ballistic missile submarines
- Country: United Kingdom
- Established: 1962
- Disestablished: 1996

The United Kingdom's Polaris programme, officially named the British Naval Ballistic Missile System, provided its first submarine-based nuclear weapons system. Polaris was in service from 1968 to 1996.

Polaris itself was an operational system of four Resolution-class ballistic missile submarines, each armed with 16 Polaris A-3 ballistic missiles. Each missile was able to deliver three ET.317 thermonuclear warheads. This configuration was later upgraded to carry two warheads hardened against the effects of radiation and nuclear electromagnetic pulse, along with a range of decoys.

The British Polaris programme was announced in December 1962 following the Nassau Agreement between the US and the UK. The Polaris Sales Agreement provided the formal framework for cooperation. Construction of the submarines began in 1964, and the first patrol took place in June 1968. All four boats were operational in December 1969. They were operated by the Royal Navy, and based at Clyde Naval Base on Scotland's west coast, a few miles from Glasgow. At least one submarine was always on patrol to provide a continuous at-sea deterrent.

In the 1970s it was considered that the re-entry vehicles were vulnerable to the Soviet anti-ballistic missile screen concentrated around Moscow. To ensure that a credible and independent nuclear deterrent was maintained, the UK developed an improved front end named Chevaline. There was controversy when this project became public knowledge in 1980, as it had been kept secret by four successive governments while incurring huge expenditure. Polaris patrols continued until May 1996, by which time the phased handover to the replacement Trident system had been completed.

== Background ==
During the early part of the Second World War, the UK had a nuclear weapons project, codenamed Tube Alloys. At the Quebec Conference in August 1943, the prime minister, Winston Churchill, and the president of the United States, Franklin Roosevelt, signed the Quebec Agreement, which merged Tube Alloys with the American Manhattan Project to create a combined British, American and Canadian project. The British government trusted that the United States would continue to share nuclear technology, which it regarded as a joint discovery, but the United States Atomic Energy Act of 1946 (McMahon Act) ended technical cooperation.

The British government feared resurgence of United States isolationism, as had occurred after the First World War, in which case the UK might have to fight an aggressor alone; or that the UK might lose its great power status and its influence in world affairs. It therefore restarted its own development effort, now codenamed High Explosive Research. The first British atomic bomb was tested in Operation Hurricane on 3 October 1952.

During the 1950s, the UK's nuclear deterrent was based around the V-bombers of the Royal Air Force (RAF), but developments in radar and surface-to-air missiles made it clear that bombers were becoming increasingly vulnerable, and would be unlikely to penetrate Soviet airspace in the 1970s. Free-fall nuclear weapons were losing credibility as a deterrent. To address this problem, the United Kingdom embarked on the development of a Medium Range Ballistic Missile called Blue Streak. By 1959—before it had even entered service—serious concerns had been raised about its own vulnerability, as it was liquid-fuelled and deployed above ground, and therefore extremely vulnerable to a pre-emptive nuclear strike.

== Royal Navy and Polaris ==
=== Nuclear ambitions ===
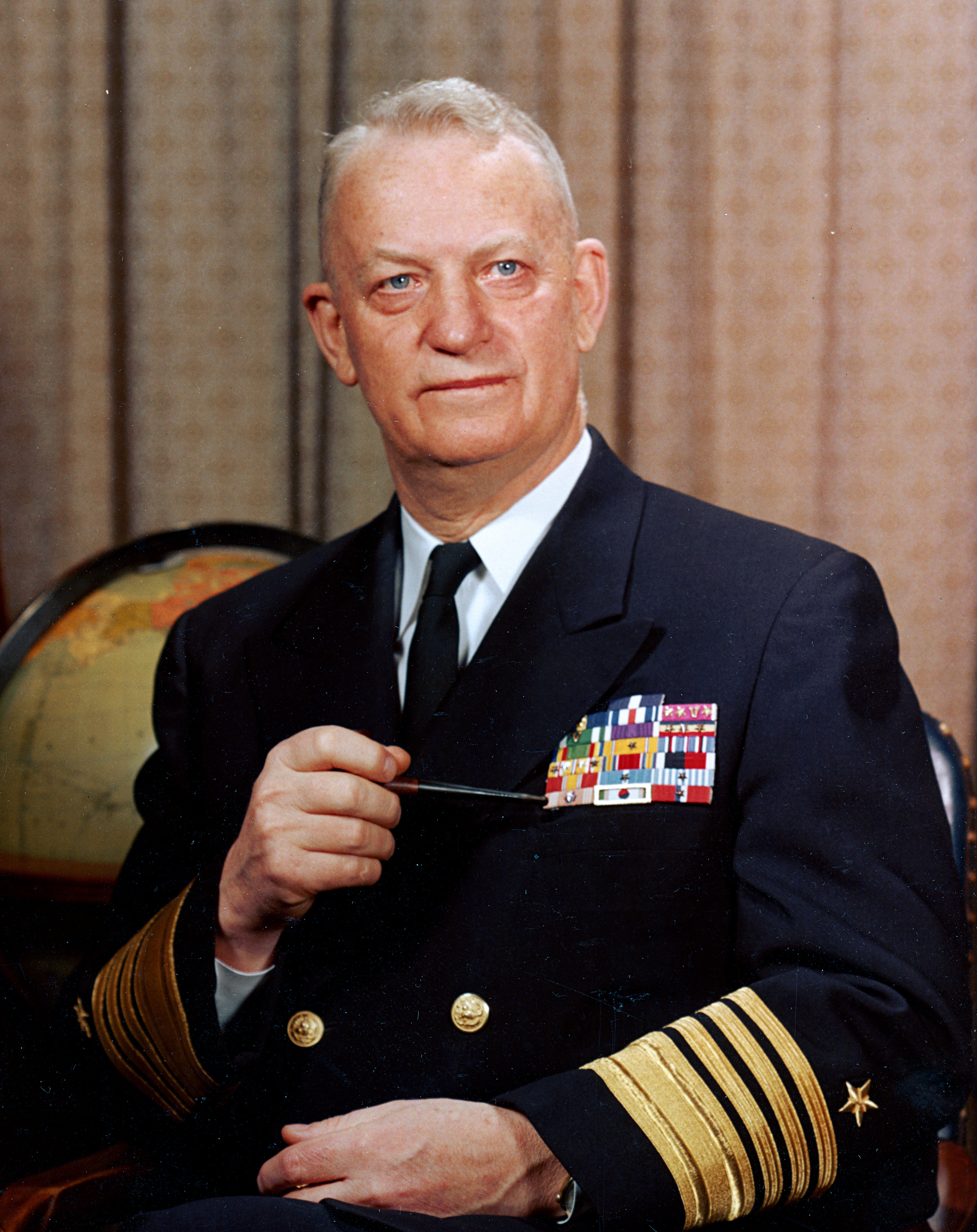
Admiral Arleigh Burke, the US Navy's Chief of Naval Operations from 1955 to 1961

The Royal Navy began seeking a nuclear role as early as 1945, when the Naval Staff suggested the possibility of launching missiles with atomic warheads from ships or submarines. In 1948 it proposed using carrier-based aircraft for nuclear weapons delivery, although atomic bombs small enough to be carried by them did not yet exist. Its "carriers versus bombers" debate with the RAF resembled the similar inter-service dispute in the United States at this time that led to the "Revolt of the Admirals". The demand for a nuclear-capable carrier bomber led to the development of the Blackburn Buccaneer. It required a small warhead, which drove the development of the Red Beard. The Defence Research Policy Committee (DRPC) considered the prospect of arming submarines with nuclear missiles, but its March 1954 report highlighted technical problems that it did not expect to be resolved for many years.

Studies of nuclear reactors for nuclear marine propulsion commenced in December 1949, but research at the Atomic Energy Research Establishment (AERE) at Harwell was directed towards development of a gas-cooled, graphite-moderated reactor which January 1952 studies showed was too large for use by the Royal Navy, and not into a Pressurised Water Reactor (PWR) of the kind that the US Navy had under development, as the United Kingdom Atomic Energy Authority did not see this kind of reactor as having civil application. Submarine propulsion research was suspended in October 1952 to conserve plutonium production for nuclear weapons, and by 1954 the Royal Navy had concluded that it would not be possible until the 1960s. The US Navy's first nuclear-powered submarine, USS Nautilus, became operational on 17 January 1955.

One reason the Royal Navy lagged behind its American counterpart was the lack of a high-ranking champion who would push nuclear submarine development. This changed when Admiral Lord Mountbatten became First Sea Lord in April 1955. In June he secured the approval of the Board of Admiralty to build a nuclear-powered submarine. This coincided with Admiral Arleigh Burke's appointment as the US Navy's Chief of Naval Operations (CNO) in August. Mountbatten visited the United States in October, and through his friendship with Burke, arranged for US Navy cooperation in submarine development. Burke's support was crucial, as the United States Congress Joint Committee on Atomic Energy was uncertain about the legality of transferring such technology to the UK, and Rear Admiral Hyman G. Rickover, the head of the US Navy's nuclear propulsion project, was opposed. But the United States Department of Defense supported the British request, and Mountbatten won Rickover over during a visit to the UK in August 1956. Rickover withdrew his objections in early 1957.

In December 1957, Rickover proposed that Westinghouse be permitted to sell the Royal Navy a nuclear submarine reactor, which would allow it to immediately proceed with building its own nuclear-powered submarine. The British government endorsed this idea, as it saved a great deal of money. The British development of the hydrogen bomb, and a favourable international relations climate created by the Sputnik crisis, facilitated the amendment of the McMahon Act to permit this, and the transfer of submarine reactor technology was incorporated in the 1958 US–UK Mutual Defence Agreement, which allowed the UK to acquire nuclear weapons systems from the United States, thereby restoring the nuclear Special Relationship.

=== Polaris development ===
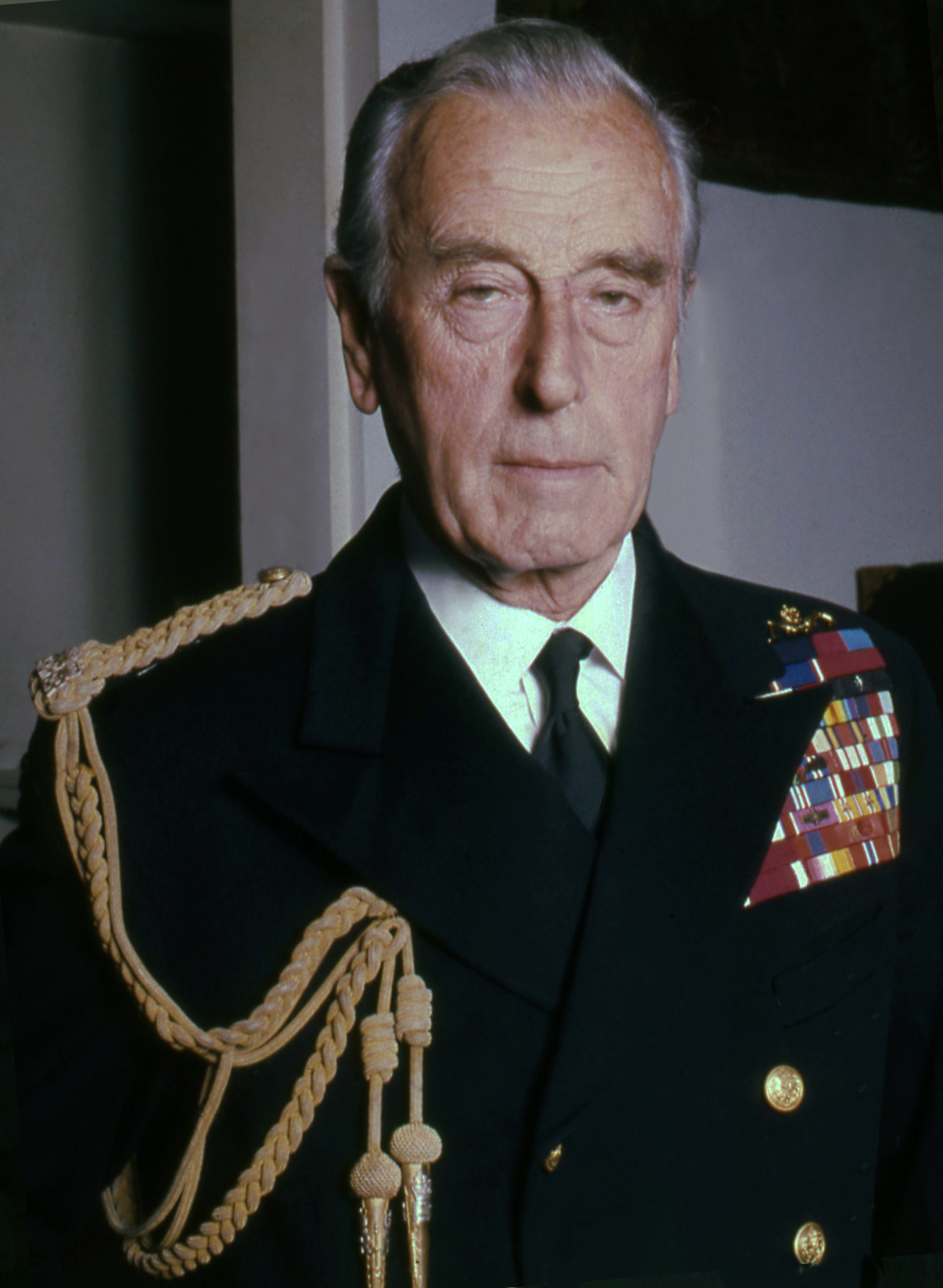
Admiral of the Fleet Lord Mountbatten, the First Sea Lord from 1955 to 1959, and the Chief of the Defence Staff from 1959 to 1965

One of Burke's first actions as CNO was to call for a report on the progress of ballistic missile research. The US Navy was involved in a cooperative venture with the US Army to develop the Jupiter missile, although there were concerns about the viability and safety of a liquid-fuel rocket at sea. To handle the Navy's side of the joint project, the United States Secretary of the Navy, Charles Thomas, created the Special Projects Office (SPO), with Rear Admiral William F. Raborn, Jr., a naval aviator, as its director. Apart from nuclear propulsion, the technologies required for a ballistic missile submarine—a long-range solid propellant rocket, a light-weight thermonuclear warhead, a compact missile guidance system, and an inertial navigation system for the submarine—did not exist in 1955.

A turning point came during Project Nobska in the summer of 1956, when Edward Teller predicted that a 270-kilogram (600 lb) warhead would become available by 1963. This was much lighter than the 730-kilogram (1,600 lb) warhead of the Jupiter, and led the US Navy to pull out of the joint Jupiter project in late 1956 in order to concentrate on the development of a solid-fuel rocket, which became Polaris. In May 1958, Burke arranged for the appointment of a Royal Navy liaison officer, Commander Michael Simeon, on the SPO staff. In 1955, the SPO staff consisted of 45 officers and 45 civilians; by mid-1961, it had grown to 200 officers and 667 civilians. By then, over 11,000 contractors were involved, and it had a budget of $2 billion. SPO had to overcome formidable technological challenges; but its success was also due to Burke's marketing of Polaris as a second strike weapon. In this role, its capabilities were highlighted and its limitations minimised. The first Polaris boat, USS George Washington, fired a Polaris missile on 20 July 1960, and commenced its initial operational patrol on 16 November 1960.

The idea of moving the nuclear deterrent away from the densely populated UK and out to sea had considerable appeal in the UK. It not only implicitly addressed the drawbacks of Blue Streak in that it was not vulnerable to a pre-emptive nuclear strike, but invoked the traditional role of the Royal Navy, and its second-strike capability made it a more credible deterrent. In February 1958, Mountbatten created a working party to examine the effectiveness, cost and development time of Polaris compared with that of Blue Streak and the V-bomber force. The working party indeed saw clear advantages in Polaris. At this point, the Minister of Defence, Duncan Sandys, requested a paper on Polaris, and was given one that strongly argued the case for Polaris. Sandys was cautious about Polaris, as it was still under development, so its costs were uncertain. The Air Ministry was understandably alarmed, circulating a paper that refuted the Admiralty's position point by point, attacking Polaris as having the same striking power but having less accuracy and a smaller warhead than Blue Streak, at 20 times the cost. The US Navy had already polished the counter-arguments, noting that second strike weapons only had to target cities, for which Polaris warhead's size and accuracy were adequate. Moreover, it was noted that while the missile was limited in range, the submarine could roam the oceans, and could attack China, for example.

== Negotiations ==
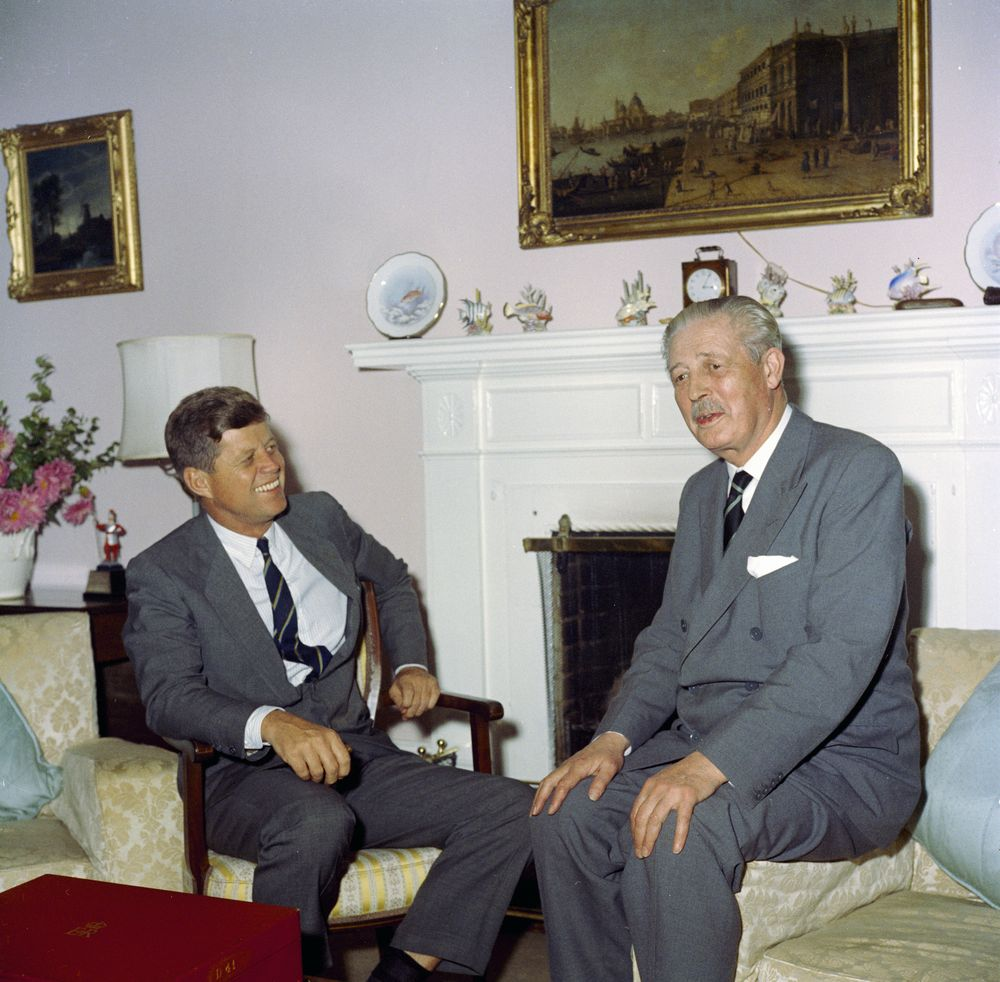
President John F. Kennedy (left) meets with the Prime Minister of the United Kingdom, Harold Macmillan (right), at Government House in Hamilton, Bermuda, on 22 December 1961.

With the cancellation of Blue Streak in the air, the British Nuclear Deterrent Study Group (BNDSG) produced a study on 23 December 1959 that argued that Polaris was expensive and unproven, and given the time it would take to build the boats, could not be deployed before the early 1970s. The Chiefs of Staff Committee therefore recommended the purchase of the American Skybolt, an air-launched ballistic missile, with Polaris as a possible successor in the 1970s. The British government decided to cancel Blue Streak if it could acquire Skybolt. The Prime Minister, Harold Macmillan, met with President Dwight Eisenhower at Camp David in March 1960, and arranged to buy Skybolt. In return, the Americans were given permission to base the US Navy's Polaris boats at Holy Loch in Scotland. The financial arrangement was particularly favourable to the UK, as the US was charging only the unit cost of Skybolt, absorbing all the research and development costs. Far from taking this as a defeat, the Royal Navy's planning for the eventual purchase of Polaris was accelerated. A June 1960 paper by the Director General, Weapons, Rear Admiral Michael Le Fanu, recommended that a Polaris project should be created along the same lines as SPO.

The Kennedy administration expressed serious doubts about Skybolt. Secretary of Defense Robert McNamara was highly critical of the US bomber fleet, which he doubted was cost effective in the missile age. Skybolt suffered from rising costs, and offered few benefits over the Hound Dog air-launched cruise missile, which was cheaper, more accurate, and actually worked; the first five Skybolt test launches were all failures. McNamara was also concerned about the UK retaining an independent nuclear force, and worried that the US could be drawn into a nuclear war by the UK. He sought to draw the UK into a Multilateral Force (MLF), an American concept under which North Atlantic Treaty Organization (NATO) nuclear weapons would remain in US custody, thereby heading off nuclear proliferation within NATO, but all NATO nations would have a finger on the nuclear trigger through multinational crewing of the ships carrying the nuclear missiles. On 7 November 1962, McNamara met with Kennedy, and recommended that Skybolt be cancelled. He then briefed the British Ambassador to the United States, David Ormsby-Gore.

At a conference in the Caribbean, Macmillan insisted that the UK would be retaining an independent deterrent capability. Kennedy's offer of Hound Dog was declined; the British government wanted Polaris. Kennedy backed down and abandoned his attempts to persuade the UK to accept the MLF in return for Macmillan's promise to assign UK Polaris boats to NATO. The two leaders concluded the Nassau Agreement, which would see the purchase of US missiles to serve aboard UK-built submarines, on 21 December 1962. This statement was later formalised as the Polaris Sales Agreement, which was signed on 6 April 1963. British politicians did not like to talk about "dependence" on the United States, preferring to describe the Special Relationship as one of "interdependence".

== Reaction ==
As had been feared, the President of France, Charles de Gaulle, vetoed the UK's application for admission to the EEC on 14 January 1963, citing the Nassau Agreement as one of the main reasons. He argued that the UK's dependence on the United States through the purchase of Polaris rendered it unfit to be a member of the EEC. The US policy of attempting to force the UK into their MLF proved to be a failure in light of this decision, and there was little enthusiasm for it from other NATO allies. By 1965, the MLF concept began fading away. Instead, the NATO Nuclear Planning Group gave NATO members a voice in the planning process without full access to nuclear weapons, while the Standing Naval Force Atlantic was established as a joint naval task force, to which NATO nations contributed ships rather than ships having multinational crews.

There was little dissent in the House of Commons from the government's nuclear weapons policy; it had bipartisan support until 1960, with only the Liberals temporarily dissenting in 1958. Despite opposition from its left wing the Labour party supported British nuclear weapons but opposed tests, and Labour Opposition Leader Hugh Gaitskell and shadow foreign secretary Aneurin Bevan agreed with Sandys on the importance of reducing dependence on the American deterrent. Bevan told his colleagues that their demand for unilateral nuclear disarmament would send a future Labour government "naked into the conference chamber" during international negotiations. Gaitskell's Labour party ceased supporting an independent deterrent in 1960 via its new "Policy for Peace", after the cancellation of Blue Streak made nuclear independence less likely. Labour also adopted a resolution supporting unilateral disarmament. Although Gaitskell opposed the resolution and it was reversed in 1961 in favour of continuing support of a general Western nuclear deterrent, the party's opposition to a British deterrent remained and became more prominent.

Macmillan's government lost a series of by-elections in 1962, and was shaken by the Profumo affair. In October 1963, Macmillan fell ill with what was initially feared to be inoperable prostate cancer, and he took the opportunity to resign on the grounds of ill-health. He was succeeded by Alec Douglas-Home, who campaigned on the UK's nuclear deterrent in the 1964 election. While of low importance in the minds of the electorate, it was one on which Douglas-Home felt passionately, and on which the majority of voters agreed with his position. The Labour Party election manifesto called for the Nassau Agreement to be renegotiated, and on 5 October 1964, the leader of the Labour Party, Harold Wilson, criticised the independent British deterrent as neither independent, nor British, nor a deterrent. Douglas-Home narrowly lost to Wilson. In office, Labour retained Polaris, and assigned the Polaris boats to NATO, in accord with the Nassau Agreement.

== Design, development and construction ==
=== Design ===
The first decision required was how many Polaris boats should be built. While the Avro Vulcans to carry Skybolt were already in service, the submarines to carry Polaris were not, and there was no provision in the defence budget for them. Some naval officers feared that their construction would adversely impact the hunter-killer submarine programme. The number of missiles required was the same as the number of Skybolt missiles, which were considered sufficient to devastate forty cities. To achieve this capability, the BNDSG calculated that this would require eight Polaris submarines, each with 16 missiles with one-megaton warheads. It was subsequently decided to halve the number of missiles, and therefore submarines, based on a decision that the ability to destroy twenty Soviet cities would have nearly as great a deterrent effect as the ability to destroy forty. The Admiralty considered the possibility of hybrid submarines that could operate as hunter-killers while carrying eight Polaris missiles, but McNamara noted that this would be inefficient, as twice as many submarines would need to be on station to maintain the deterrent, and cautioned that the effect of tinkering with the US Navy's 16-missile layout was unpredictable. The Treasury costed a four-boat Polaris fleet at £314 million by 1972–1973. A Cabinet Defence Committee meeting on 23 January 1963 approved the plan for four boats, with the Minister of Defence, Peter Thorneycroft noting that four boats would be cheaper and faster to build than eight.

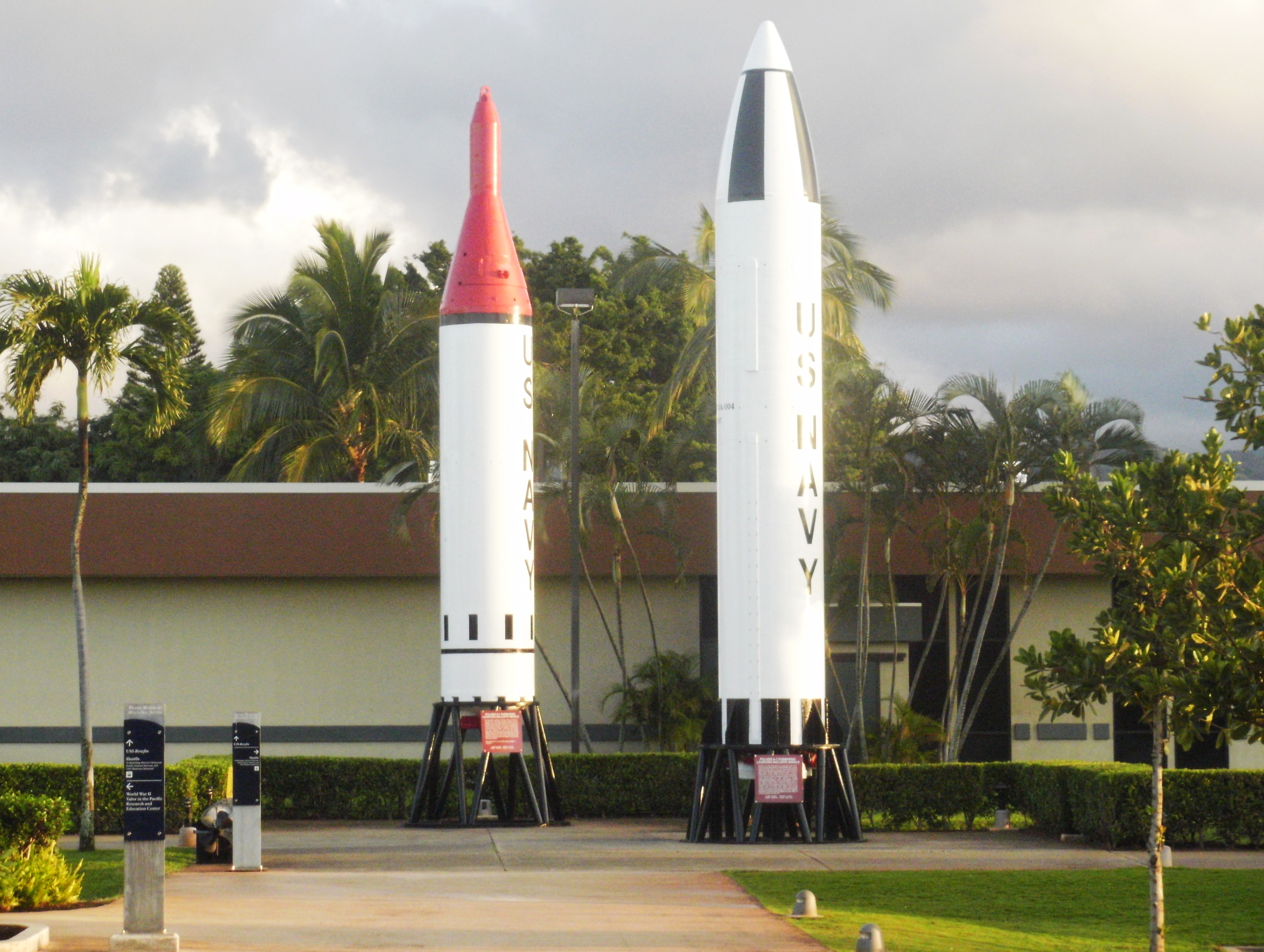
A Polaris A-1 missile (left) and a Polaris A-3 missile (right) at the USS Bowfin Submarine Museum in Honolulu, Hawaii

A mission led by Sir Solly Zuckerman, the Chief Scientific Adviser to the Ministry of Defence, left for the United States to discuss Polaris on 8 January 1963. It included the Vice Chief of the Naval Staff, Vice Admiral Sir Varyl Begg; the Deputy Secretary of the Admiralty, James Mackay; Rear Admiral Hugh Mackenzie; physicist Sir Robert Cockburn; and F. J. Doggett from the Ministry of Aviation. Its principal finding was that the Americans had developed a new version of the Polaris missile, the A-3. With a range of 2,500 nautical miles (4,600 km), it had a new weapons bay housing three re-entry vehicles (REBs or Re-Entry Bodies in US Navy parlance) and a new 200-kilotonne-of-TNT (840 TJ) W58 warhead expected to become available around 1970. A decision was urgently required on whether to purchase the old A-2 missile or the new A-3, as the A-2 production lines would shut down within two years. The Zuckerman mission came out strongly in favour of the latter, although it was still under development and not expected to enter service until August 1964, as the deterrent would remain credible for much longer. The decision was endorsed by the First Lord of the Admiralty, Lord Carrington, in May 1963, and was officially made by Thorneycroft on 10 June 1963.

While the Zuckerman mission was in Washington, R. J. Daniel of the Royal Corps of Naval Constructors led a deep technical mission to the United States to study the latest developments in the design of ballistic missile submarines. They met with Rear Admiral Pete Galantin, Raborn's successor as the head of SPO, and executives at the Electric Boat Company, which was building the American Polaris boats. While it was desirable to hew closely to the American design, this would involve retooling the British shipyards and purchasing American equipment. An alternative proposal was to take the incomplete nuclear-powered hunter-killer submarine HMS Valiant, cut it in half, and insert the Polaris missile compartment in its midsection. This was a path that the Americans had taken with the George Washington class in order to build ships as quickly as possible in order to address the missile gap, the purported numerical superiority of the Soviet Union's missile force, which turned out to be illusory.

Daniel was opposed to this on the grounds that it would unduly disrupt the hunter-killer submarine programme, and it would add more new features to a design that already had enough. The chosen design was suggested by Daniel's superior, Sidney Palmer. The reactor section would be similar to that of Valiant, which would be joined with a machinery space to the American-designed but mainly British-built missile compartment. The forward section would be of a new design. The 130-metre (425 ft) boat would have a displacement of 7,600 tonnes (7,500 long tons), more than twice that of HMS Dreadnought, the Royal Navy's first nuclear-powered submarine. Following British practice, the boats would be identical, with no deviation allowed. The value of this was driven home by a visit to the submarine tender USS Hunley, where the costs of non-standard components were evident.

=== Organisation ===
Polaris Executive Senior Management
Chief Polaris Executive
- Rear Admiral Hugh Mackenzie (1963–1968)
- Rear Admiral Allan Trewby (1968–1971)
Technical Director
- Rowland Baker (1963–1968)
- Rear Admiral C. W. H. Shepard (1968–1971)
Assistant Chief Polaris Executive
- Captain J. R. McKaig (1963–1966)
- Captain P. C. Higham (1966–1968)
Chief Administrative Officer
- R. N. Lewin (1963–1966)
- P. Nailor (1966–1967)
- M. G. Power (1967–1969)
Deputy Director of Naval Construction (Polaris)
- S. J. Palmer (1963–1967)
- H. J. Tabb (1967–1969)
Deputy Director, Weapons (Polaris)
- Captain C. W. H. Shepard (1963–1968)
Polaris Logistics Officer
- Captain L. Bomford (1963–1969)
Polaris Project Officer, Ministry of Aviation
- Rear Admiral F. Dossor (1963–1967)
- S. A. Hunwicks (1967–1969)
Royal Navy Liaison Officer (Special Projects)
- Captain P. G. La Niece (1963–1969)
- Captain C. H. Hammer (1963–1969)
Special Projects Liaison Officer
- Captain P. A. Rollings, USN (1963)
- Captain W. P. Murphy, USN (1963–1966)
- Captain J. Love, USN (1966–1968)

The project was formally named the British Naval Ballistic Missile System. The Board of the Admiralty met on 24 December 1962 and decided to adopt Le Fanu's proposal that a special organisation be created to manage the project. It did not create a replica of SPO, however, but a smaller administrative and organisational cadre. Mackenzie, the Flag Officer Submarines (FOSM), was informed on 26 December 1962 that he would be appointed the Chief Polaris Executive (CPE); the term was henceforth used to refer to both the man and his organisation. Rowland Baker, who had been the head of the Dreadnought Project Team, was appointed the Technical Director. Captain C. W. H. Shepard, who had worked on the Seaslug missile project, became the Deputy Director for Weapons, and Captain Leslie Bomford was appointed the Polaris Logistics Officer. The creation of this position was the only significant departure from Le Fanu's original blueprint. Some staff were assigned to the Polaris Executive and responsible only to the CPE; but there were also "allocated staff", who were seconded to the Polaris Executive, but who remained responsible to another organisation, such as the Directors-General of Ships and Weapons; and "designated staff", who were not employed on the Polaris project full-time, and remained part of their parent organisations.

Mackenzie established his own office and that of his immediate staff in London, which he considered was necessary in order to be in immediate contact with the Admiralty, the ministers, and the key departments. He was initially given two rooms and a closet at the Admiralty. Most of the Polaris Executive was located in Bath, Somerset, where the Admiralty's technical and logistics departments had been relocated in 1938, "the connection between bath, water and boats having not escaped the administrative minds in Whitehall." Initially they were accommodated in the Admiralty complex there, spread over three different sites. To allow the Polaris Executive to be co-located, a block of single-storey prefabricated offices was built at Foxhill on the south side of Bath, which was occupied in February 1964. By 1966, including allocated but not designated staff, the Polaris Executive had 38 staff at the London office, 430 in Bath, 5 at the Ministry of Aviation, and 31 in Washington.

An early issue that arose concerned the relationship between the Polaris programme and the hunter-killer programme. At this time point, Valiant was under construction, but the second boat of the class, HMS Warspite, was yet to be laid down at Barrow. The possibility of the two projects competing for resources was foreseen, but the Admiralty elected to continue with its construction. The interdependence between the two projects extended well beyond the shipyard; Valiant would be the first boat powered by the Rolls-Royce pressurised water reactor, which would also be used in the new Polaris ballistic missile submarines. In early 1963 the reactor was still in the prototype stage at Dounreay. The overlap between the two projects was sufficiently substantial that in May 1963 it was decided that CPE would be responsible for both.

The Joint Steering Task Group (JSTG) was established by Article II of the Polaris Sales Agreement. It was modelled after the Steering Task Group that oversaw the Special Projects Office. It met for the first time in Washington on 26 June 1963. The respective liaison officers acted as the secretaries of the JSTG. These were appointed in April 1963, with Captain Peter La Niece taking up the position in Washington, and Captain Phil Rollings in London. The agenda for the meetings was normally agreed about three weeks beforehand via an exchange of teletype messages, with position papers exchanged about a week beforehand. Meetings were normally held over three days. Initially the JSTG met quarterly, but this was reduced to three times a year in 1965. The flow of information tended to be towards the UK. The JSTG was not an adversarial forum, but from the start there were disagreements over the scope of the Polaris Sales Agreement, which the staff of CPE saw as open-ended, but that of SPO saw as limited in nature.

=== Construction ===
The choice of Vickers-Armstrongs as shipbuilder was a foregone conclusion, as its yard at Barrow-in-Furness in Cumbria was the only one in the UK with experience in nuclear-powered submarine construction. The firm was thoroughly familiar with the heightened requirements nuclear-powered submarine construction entailed in terms of cleanliness, safety and quality control, and the government had already spent £1.5 million upgrading the yard's facilities. The only concern was whether the large Polaris boats could navigate the shallow Walney Channel. A formal letter of intent was sent to Vickers on 18 February, and its selection as lead yard was publicly announced on 11 March 1963. The question then naturally arose as to whether Vickers should build all the Polaris boats. Given the size of the yard and its labour force, and the desired speed of construction, the Admiralty decided that Vickers would build two boats, and the others would be built elsewhere. Tenders were invited from two firms with experience in building conventional submarines, Cammell Laird in Birkenhead, and Scotts in Greenock, on 25 March. Cammell Laird was chosen, and a letter of intent was sent on 7 May 1963. Some £1.6 million of new equipment was required to prepare the yard for Polaris work. Two berths and the jetty were rebuilt, and works were also necessary on the roads and river wall. A 9.4-metre (31 ft) cofferdam was built to allow construction of a new slipway and other works to be carried out in dry rather than tidal conditions. New facilities were also added in Barrow, and the Walney Channel was dredged.

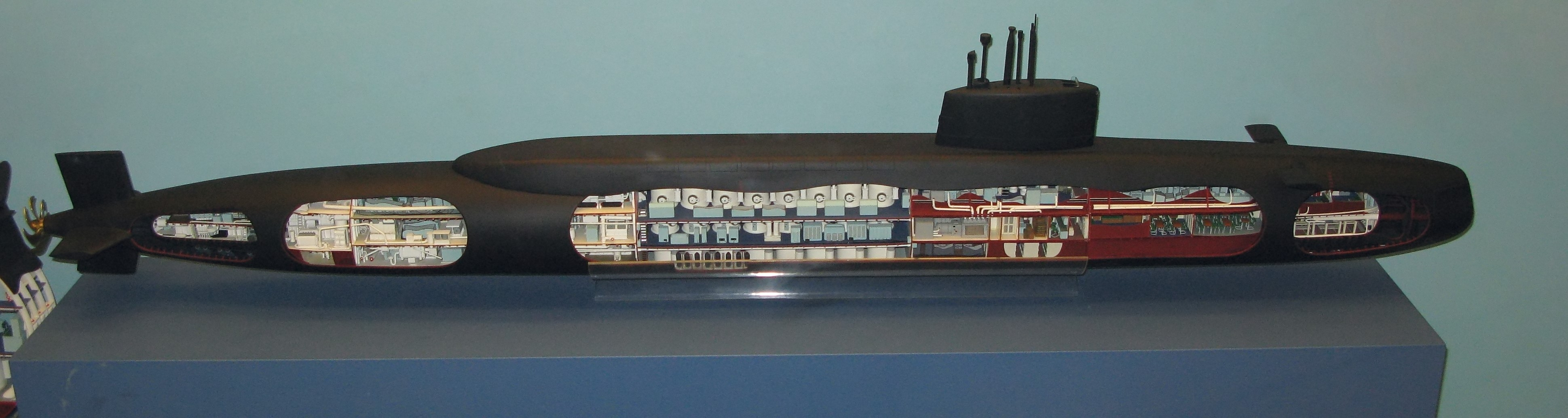
Cutaway model of HMS Resolution at the Science Museum, London

Traditional battleship or battlecruiser names were chosen for the Polaris boats, signifying that they were the capital ships of their time. All were named after ships that Mountbatten had served on. The first boat, HMS Resolution, was laid down by Vickers on 26 February 1964; the second, HMS Renown, by Cammell Laird on 26 June 1964. They were followed by two more boats the following year, one at each yard: HMS Repulse at Barrow on 16 June 1965, and HMS Revenge at Birkenhead on 19 May 1965. The Polaris boats became known as the Resolution class. Resolution was launched on 15 September 1965, and commissioned on 2 October 1967. Resolution conducted a test firing at the American Eastern Range on 15 February 1968. The first Cammell Laird boat, Renown followed, and was launched on 25 February 1967. The second Vickers boat, Repulse, was launched on 11 November 1967. Concerns about the Walney Channel proved justified; when the launch was delayed by half an hour due to a protest by the Campaign for Nuclear Disarmament, the falling tide left insufficient clearance, and the boat became stuck in the mud.

The more experienced Vickers yard worked faster than Cammell Laird, and despite labour problems, Repulse was commissioned on 28 September 1968, before Renown on 15 November 1968. This achievement was all the more remarkable because the Vickers yard still managed to complete the hunter-killer Valiant in 1966 and Warspite the following year. The final boat, Revenge, was completed on 4 December 1969. There was concern in 1966 when it was discovered that the distance between the bulkheads in the torpedo storage department on Renown differed from that on Resolution by 1 inch (25 mm). An even more disturbing revelation occurred in November 1966, when eleven pieces of broken metal were found in the reactor circuits. Their removal set the programme back two months. The Cammell Laird boats had a reputation for not being as well built as those of Vickers, which was a factor in the subsequent 1969 decision by the Treasury and the Royal Navy to restrict future nuclear submarine construction to a single yard. Revenge and the hunter-killer HMS Conqueror were the last built at Cammell Laird.

=== Fifth boat ===
When the initial decision to build four Polaris boats was taken in January 1963, neither the financial nor the operational implications of this decision were certain, so an option to acquire a fifth boat was provided for, with a decision to be taken later in the year. By September 1963, CPE came to the conclusion that a fifth boat was absolutely necessary. Due to the required refit cycles, a five boat force would, at certain times, only have one boat at sea. Given the standard 56-day US Navy patrol cycle, two boats would be on station 250 days a year. There was also no margin for the possibility of the temporary interruption to service of one boat due to an accident. From an operational point of view, having two boats on patrol meant there was a capability to destroy twenty cities; one would only be capable of destroying seven or eight, based on an assumption of 70 per cent reliability, and Leningrad and Moscow requiring two and four missiles respectively. Two boats also complicate the task of missile defence, as the missiles come from two different directions. The purchase of an additional boat did not necessarily require that of sixteen more missiles, nor even for two more crews, and a second construction line at Cammell Laird permitted work on a fifth boat to proceed without impacting schedules for the other boats. The fifth boat was estimated to cost £18 million; cancellation charges would be less than £1 million. The matter was considered by the Cabinet Defence and Overseas Policy Committee on 25 February 1964, and then by the full Cabinet later that morning, and the decision was taken to approve the fifth boat, provided the money could be found elsewhere in the defence budget.

After Wilson took office, one of the first acts of the incoming Secretary of State for Defence, Denis Healey, was to ask the Navy for the case for building five Polaris boats. This was furnished by the First Sea Lord, Admiral Sir David Luce, on 19 October 1964. The government was under considerable pressure to reduce annual defence expenditures below £2 billion, and Healey considered whether three boats would be sufficient. Luce and Mountbatten advised that it would not. Wilson was aware that the government had only a narrow majority, and that Douglas-Home's attack on his party's nuclear deterrent policy had cost votes. Cabinet finally decided on 12 January 1965 that there should be four boats. The decision was officially announced on 15 February. One important matter that SPO raised was that A-3 production would in due course be closed down, and the missile replaced by a new model under development then known as the B3, which eventually became the Poseidon. Thus, a final decision on the number of missiles and spare parts was required. This gravely concerned the British government. If the USN upgraded to Poseidon, the UK would have to either follow suit or maintain Polaris alone. "True to form", commented Patrick Gordon Walker, "we either buy weapons which don’t exist or buy those destined for the junkyard of Steptoe & Son."

=== Missile ===
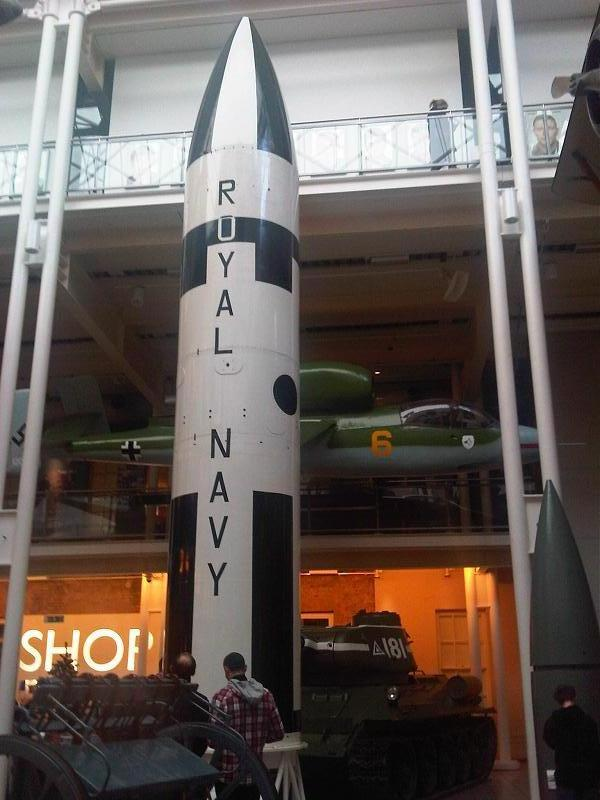
British Polaris missile on display in the Imperial War Museum in London

Under Article XI of the Polaris Sales Agreement, the UK contributed five per cent of research and development costs of Polaris incurred after 1 January 1963, plus any costs incurred as a result of purely British requirements. This added about £2 million to the cost of the system. The government denied speculation that the Nassau Agreement permitted the addition of electronic mechanisms in the missile to give the United States a veto over its use.

The A-3 missile that replaced the earlier A-1 and A-2 models in the US Navy had a range of 2,500 nautical miles (4,600 km) and a new Mark 2 weapon bay housing three re-entry vehicles. This arrangement was originally described as a "cluster warhead" but was replaced with the term Multiple Re-Entry Vehicle (MRV). They were not independently targeted (as a MIRV missile is) but the three warheads were spread about a common target, landing about 1 nautical mile (1.9 km) apart and one second apart so as to not be affected by each other's radiation pulse. They were stated to be equivalent in destructive power to a single one-megaton warhead. It was believed that the MRV arrangement would also make the warhead harder to intercept with an anti-ballistic missile (ABM) similar to that of the American Nike Zeus system.

Testing of the A-3, with its new guidance and re-entry packages commenced on 7 August 1962, and continued until 2 July 1964. Thirty-eight test firings were carried out, with the longest range achieved being 2,284 nautical miles (4,230 km). The first submerged launch was conducted on 26 October 1963. Most of the problems encountered involved failures of the re-entry body to separate correctly. The A-3 became operational on 28 September 1964, when USS Daniel Webster commenced her first operational patrol.

=== Warhead ===
In the wake of the decision to acquire the A-3, a US-UK Joint Re-Entry Systems Working Group (JRSWG) was created to examine issues surrounding the warhead and re-entry vehicle. The Americans revealed that work was in progress to add penetration aids to the re-entry vehicle, but promised that it would not have any effect on the interface between the missile and the UK re-entry vehicle. The British team did not think they were necessary, and in the end the Americans never deployed them with the A-3. The initial assumption at the Admiralty was that the Atomic Weapons Research Establishment (AWRE) at Aldermaston would produce a copy of the W58. However, this would require techniques and equipment not employed in the UK before, and the AWRE Warhead Safety Coordinating Committee (WSCC) reported in December 1963 that the design of the W58 primary did not meet UK safety standards.

The decision was therefore taken in March 1964 to substitute the British fission primary, codenamed "Katie", used in the WE.177B developed for Skybolt. The fusion secondary was codenamed "Reggie". This became known as the ET.317. Its development involved an increase of about 500 staff at Aldermaston compared to that anticipated for Skybolt, with 4,500 staff expected to be working on nuclear weapons by 1969. When it came to the Re-Entry System (RES), the US Navy was using the Mark 2 Mod 0 RES, but had a new version, the Mark 2 Mod 1 under development. In order to meet Polaris in-service deadline of May 1968, the components had to be ordered by May 1964. The Ministry of Aviation and the Admiralty therefore opted for the Mark 2 Mod 0 RES.

To validate the design, a programme of nuclear tests was required, which was estimated to cost around £5.9 million. This was authorised by Douglas-Home on 28 November 1963. A series of underground tests were carried out at the Nevada Test Site in the United States, starting with Whetstone/Cormorant on 17 July 1964. The next test, Whetstone/Courser on 25 September 1964 failed due to a fault in the American neutron initiators, and had to be repeated as Flintlock/Charcoal on 10 September 1965. This tested a design of the ET.317 using less plutonium. With four Polaris boats each carrying 16 missiles each with three warheads, there were 192 warheads in total. This modification therefore saved 166 kg of plutonium worth £2.5 million. Additional active materials required were obtained from the US. Some 5.37 tonnes of UK-produced plutonium was exchanged for 6.7 kg of tritium and 7.5 tonnes of highly enriched uranium between 1960 and 1979. Warhead manufacture commenced in December 1966.

== Operations ==
It was originally estimated that Polaris would require 6,000 officers and men. Although less than what had been required for the V-bombers, this was still substantial, and the well-trained personnel required had to be found from within the Royal Navy. The First Sea Lord, Admiral of the Fleet Sir Caspar John, denounced the "millstone of Polaris hung around our necks" as "potential wreckers of the real navy". Even among the submariners there was a notable lack of enthusiasm for lurking in the depths staying out of trouble as opposed to the more active mission of the hunter-killer submarines. In earlier times submarine construction had been low on the Royal Navy's list of priorities, and the Royal Navy Submarine Service had formed, like the Fleet Air Arm, something of a private navy within the Royal Navy. Unlike the Fleet Air Arm though, it had no representation on the Board of the Admiralty such as the Fleet Air Arm enjoyed through the Fifth Sea Lord, and the only submarine flag officer billet was FOSM. Few submariners expected to rise to flag rank, but this was already changing with the ascension of officers like Mackenzie and Luce.

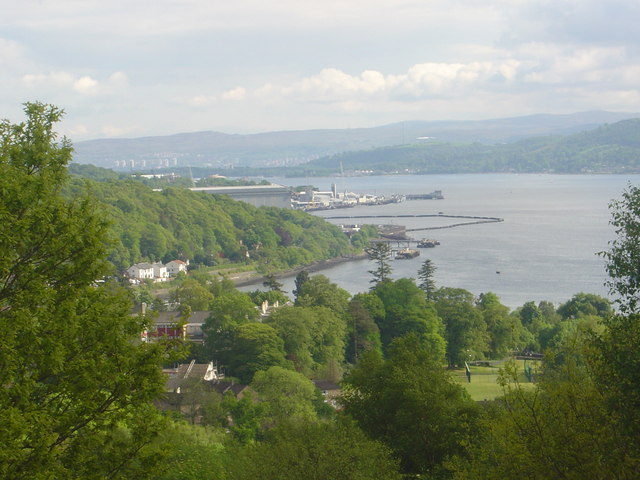
Faslane Naval Base

In March 1963, it was decided that the Polaris boats would be based at Faslane on the Firth of Clyde, not far from the US Navy's base at Holy Loch. The conventional submarines of the 3rd Submarine Squadron already had a forward base there, with jetties, facilities and the submarine depot ship HMS Maidstone. The design and construction of a new base was undertaken by the Ministry of Public Building and Works. Construction was not straightforward, as the ground was rocky and the rainfall was high. Works included a new jetty, accommodation, recreational facilities, workshops, emergency power sources, a mobile repair facility and a calibration laboratory. The new base opened in August 1968. It was served by a weapons store at nearby Coulport. HM Dockyard, Rosyth, was designated as the refit yard for the Polaris boats, as works were already underway there to support Dreadnought. HM Dockyard, Chatham, was subsequently upgraded to handle the hunter-killer submarines, and Rosyth was reserved for the 10th Submarine Squadron, as the Polaris boats became.

To train the required crews, a Royal Navy Polaris School (RNPS) was built adjacent to the base at Faslane, although it was accepted that training of the first two crews at least would have to be conducted in the United States, and arrangements for this were made with SPO. SPO also convinced the US Air Force that the Polaris Sales Agreement meant that the Royal Navy should have access to the Eastern Test Range, for which it was to be charged the same fee as the US Navy. The US Navy had two training facilities, at Dam Neck in Virginia Beach, Virginia, and at Pearl Harbor near Honolulu, Hawaii. They were not identical, and were oriented towards training in maintenance rather than operations. Shepard's group pushed for the RNPS to have equipment that looked identical to an actual Polaris submarine, and performed or simulated its operation. Would-be submarine captains went through the Submarine Command Course, known as the Perisher. This had always been an extremely tough course; now it became tougher still. It was designed to test candidates to their utmost, and to allow them to explore and accept their limitations. Despite passing the course, some officers still turned down the opportunity to command a Polaris boat, even though it ended their careers. The Royal Navy adopted the US Navy practice of having two crews for each boat, but instead of calling them the "Gold" and "Blue" crews as in the US Navy, they were known as the "Port" and "Starboard" crews. The commanders of the first boat, HMS Resolution, were appointed in October 1965. Commander Michael Henry commanded the Port crew, and Commander Kenneth Frewer, the Starboard crew.

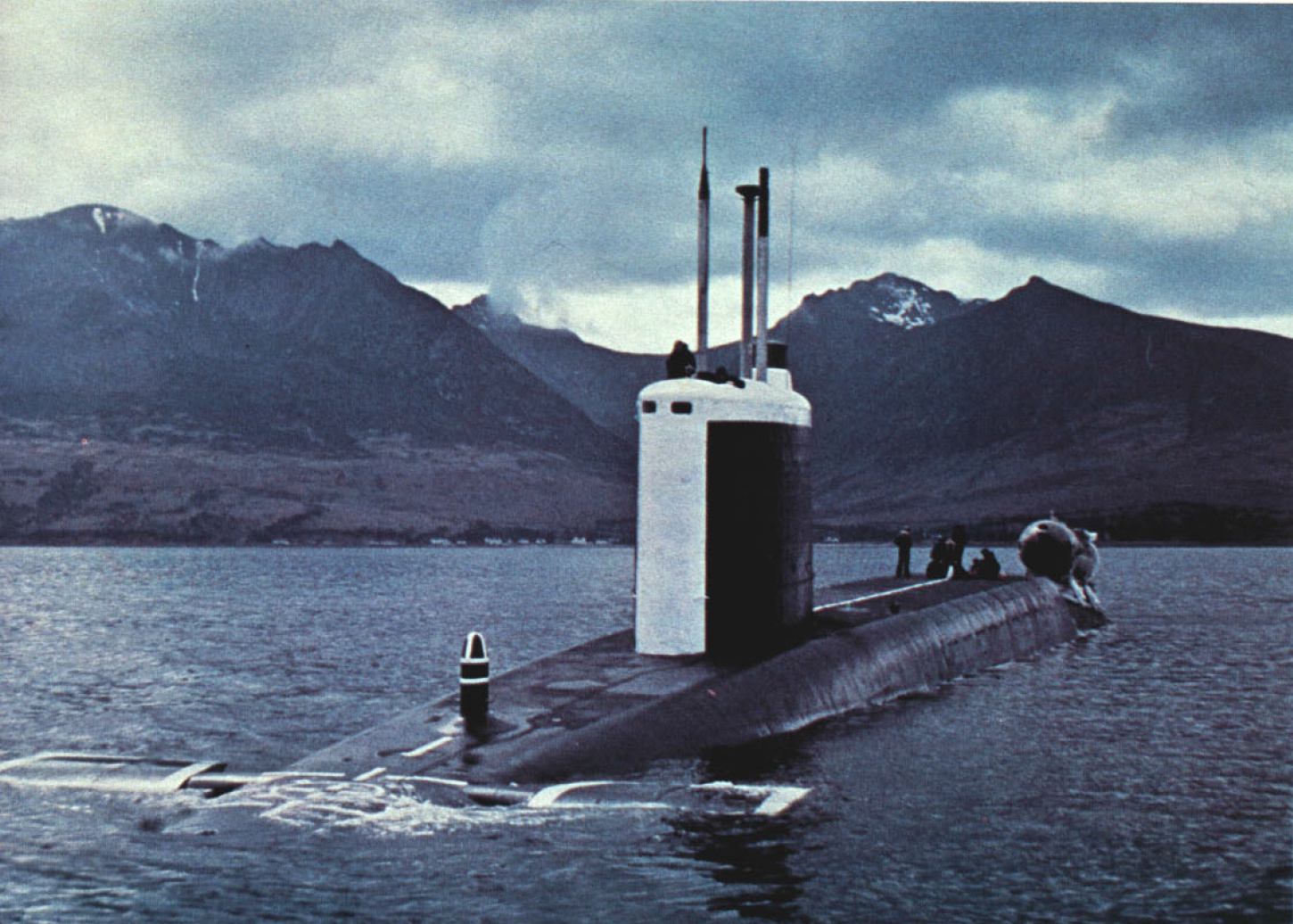
HMS Repulse in the Firth of Clyde

On 16 October 1964, in the midst of the election campaign that brought the Wilson government to office, China conducted its first nuclear test. This led to fears that India might follow suit. Consideration was therefore given to the possibility of basing Polaris boats in the Far East. A planning paper was drawn up in January 1965. The Navy Department reported that with five boats it would be possible to have one on patrol in the Pacific or Indian Ocean, but with only four a depot ship would be required, which would cost around £18 to £20 million. A base would be required, and Fremantle in Australia was suggested. In any case, it would not be possible before all four boats were operational. The proposal ran into opposition from the Supreme Allied Commander Europe (SACEUR), General Lyman Lemnitzer, who pressed on 2 January 1967 to have the Polaris boats assigned to NATO as promised under the Nassau Agreement. In January 1968, the issue became moot when Cabinet decided to withdraw British forces from East of Suez. The prospect of cancelling Polaris was also discussed, but Wilson fought for its retention. In the end, "the economic, strategic and diplomatic benefits of the Polaris system were even ultimately great enough to persuade a Labour government that retention of a British Polaris force was necessary." In June 1968 it was agreed that the Polaris boats would be assigned to NATO. On 14 June 1969, Commander Henry Ellis, the head of the Royal Navy's Plans Division, formally notified his RAF counterpart that the Royal Navy was assuming the responsibility for the UK's strategic nuclear deterrent.

For submarine captains accustomed to patrols in other submarines, a Polaris patrol required a different mindset. Instead of locating, stalking and closing on prospective targets, the Polaris boat was itself the hunted, and had to avoid any contact with other vessels. For submariners accustomed to diesel-powered boats, the Polaris boats were very pleasant indeed. There was no need to conserve water, as there was distilling capacity to spare, so the crew could have hot showers and laundry facilities. Nor was there any need to conserve battery power, as the reactor supplied enough power for a small town. A Polaris boat had a crew of 14 officers and 129 ratings. Every sailor had his own bunk, so there was no hot bunking. Meals were served in a dining hall. The crew included a doctor and supply officers. Before commencing an eight-week patrol, a submarine was stocked with enough food for 143 men. Supplies for a typical patrol might include 1,587 kilograms (3,500 lb) of beef, 2,268 kilograms (5,000 lb) of potatoes, 5,000 eggs, 1,000 chickens, 3.2 kilometres (2 mi) of sausages, and 1 tonne (0.98 LT) of beans. Polaris skippers paid great attention to morale on their boats, which tended to sag around the fifth and sixth weeks of a patrol.

== Upgrades ==
The original US Navy Polaris had not been designed to penetrate ABM defences, but the Royal Navy had to ensure that its small Polaris force operating alone, and often with only one submarine on deterrent patrol, could penetrate the ABM screen around Moscow. The Americans upgraded to Poseidon, which had MIRV warheads. Although it suffered from reliability problems that were not completely resolved until 1974, it represented a clear improvement over Polaris, and became the preferred option of the AWRE and the Admiralty. While it could not be carried by the ten George Washington- and Ethan Allen-class boats, it could be accommodated on the British Resolution class. Zuckerman attended a meeting with Rear Admiral Levering Smith, the director of SPO, and John S. Foster, Jr., the director of the Lawrence Livermore National Laboratory, at which the provision of Poseidon to the UK was discussed. While the cost was a factor, the main obstacle was political, and the Wilson government publicly ruled out the purchase of Poseidon in June 1967. Without an agreement on improvement, the Special Relationship began to decay. The Americans were unwilling to share information about warhead vulnerability unless the British were going to proceed to applying it.

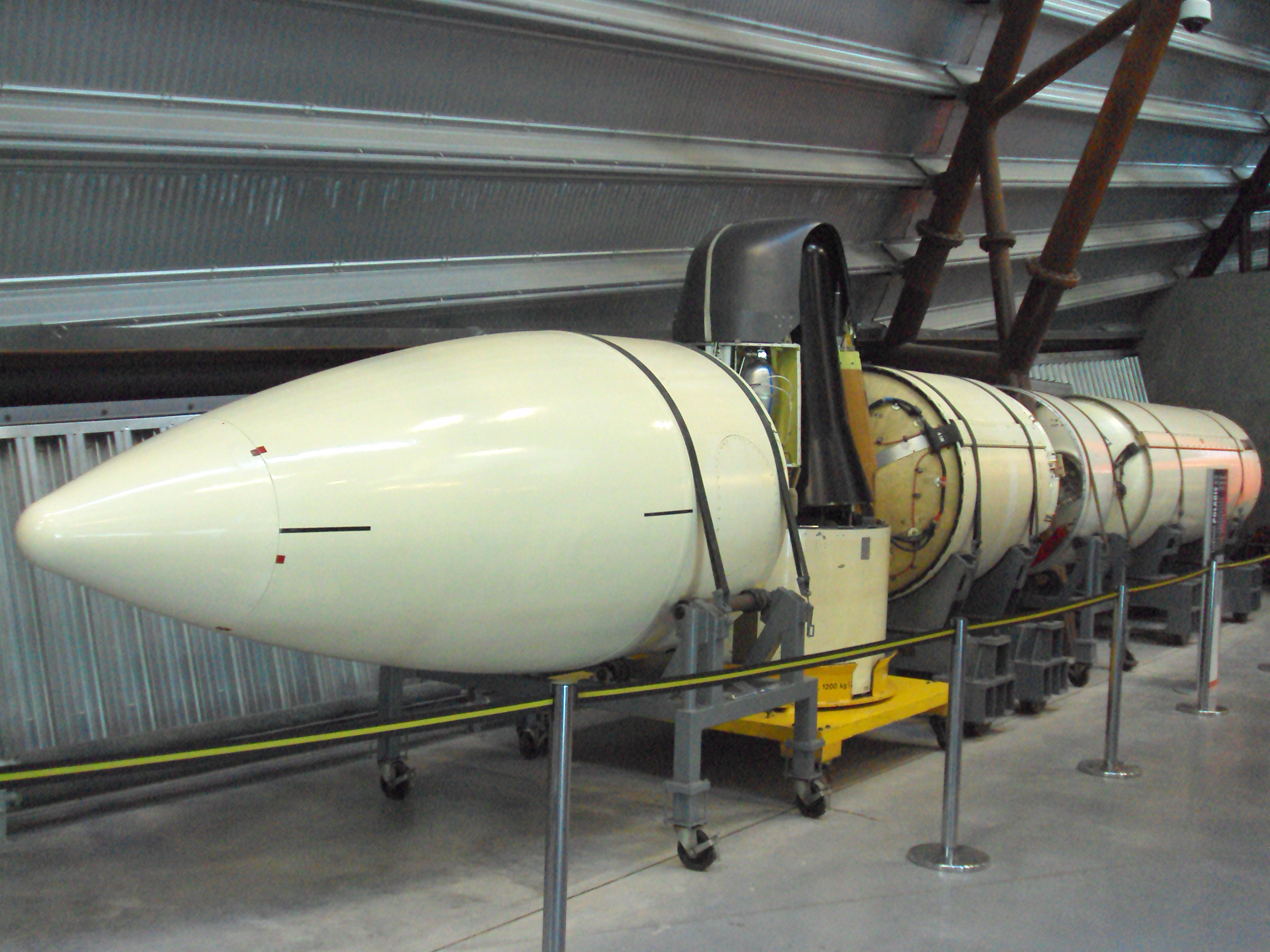
Polaris missile at the Royal Air Force Museum Midlands with Chevaline (centre, on yellow trolley)

The result was Chevaline, an improved front end (IFE) that replaced one of the three warheads with multiple decoys, chaff, and other defensive countermeasures, in what was known as a Penetration Aid Carrier (PAC). It was the most technically complex defence project ever undertaken in the United Kingdom. The system also involved "hardening" the warheads—making them resistant to the effects of a nuclear electromagnetic pulse (EMP). The Americans used a material known as 3DPQ, a phenolic thermosetting material infused with quartz fibres, in the heat shield of the warheads, which also acted as a defence against irradiation. Its adoption by the British warhead saved on research, but required a redesign of their warhead. The new warhead was designated the A-3TK, the old one being the A-3T. In 1972 Chevaline was estimated to cost £235 million. Agreement was reached with the Americans to conduct another series of tests in Nevada. The first of these, Arbor/Fallon, was conducted on 23 May 1974.

By 1975, the cost of Chevaline had risen to £400 million, but it was protected from the budget cuts that affected the rest of defence spending by its own secrecy. Its main technical problem was that the PAC was heavier than the warhead it replaced, which reduced the range of the entire missile. This drove debate about the number of decoys that were required. The Chief of the Defence Staff, Field Marshal Sir Michael Carver suggested giving up on the "Moscow criterion" (under which the role of the British missiles was to destroy Moscow) and re-target Polaris to devastate less strongly defended cities. This was regarded as politically and militarily problematic, but was reluctantly accepted. At the same time, the government elected to press on with Chevaline. Another test, Anvil/Banon, was conducted in Nevada on 26 August 1976. By 1979, the cost had risen to £935 million, with test missile firings conducted from the Eastern Test Range and the Woomera Test Range, including three off Cape Canaveral by Renown, along with another series of nuclear tests in Nevada.

Chevaline's existence, along with its formerly secret codename, was revealed by the Secretary of State for Defence, Francis Pym, during a debate in the House of Commons on 24 January 1980. Sea trials were held in November 1980. The system became operational in mid-1982 on Renown, followed by Revenge in 1983, Resolution in 1985, and Repulse in 1987. One hundred A-3TK warheads were produced between 1979 and 1982. The final cost reached £1,025 million. However, the Public Accounts Committee noted that due to inflation, £1 billion in April 1981 (equivalent to £4.03 billion in 2024) was not significantly greater than £235 million in April 1972 (equivalent to £3.51 billion in 2024). What disturbed the committee more was that a major project had gone on for a decade without any disclosure of its costs to Parliament or any requirement that they should be. The range of the Chevaline system was 1,950 nautical miles (3,610 km) compared to 2,500-nautical-mile (4,600 km) range of the original system, which reduced the sea-room in which British submarines could hide.

The Polaris system was also upgraded through the replacement of the solid fuel motors after some test-firing failures. The re-motoring programme commenced in 1981, and new motors were installed in all missiles by 1988. This cost £300 million.

== Opposition ==
The Manchester Guardian and other newspapers critical of the Conservative government supported the British deterrent. In 1962 it stated that the forthcoming Chinese nuclear weapon was a reason for having more than one Western nuclear nation. From 1955 the government chose to emphasize the nuclear deterrent and de-emphasize conventional forces. The Economist, the New Statesman, and many left-wing newspapers supported the reliance on nuclear deterrence and nuclear weapons, but in their view considered that of the United States would suffice, and that of the costs of the "nuclear umbrella" was best left to be borne by the United States alone.

The anti-nuclear movement in the United Kingdom consisted of groups who opposed nuclear technologies such as nuclear power and nuclear weapons. Many different groups and individuals have been involved in anti-nuclear demonstrations and protests over the years. One of the most prominent anti-nuclear groups in the UK is the Campaign for Nuclear Disarmament (CND). This national movement was founded in the late 1950s, initially in opposition to nuclear testing. It reached its peak around 1960, by which time it had evolved into a broader movement calling for the UK to unilaterally give up nuclear weapons, withdraw from NATO, and end the basing of US bombers armed with nuclear weapons in the UK.

Thereafter, the end of atmospheric nuclear testing, internal squabbles, and activists focusing their energies on other causes led to a rapid decline, but it revived in the early 1980s in the wake of the December 1979 decision to deploy US cruise missiles in the UK, and the announcement of the decision to purchase Trident in July 1980. Membership leapt from 3,000 in 1980 to 50,000 a year later, and rallies for unilateral nuclear disarmament in London in October 1981 and June 1982 attracted 250,000 marchers, the largest ever mass demonstrations in the UK up to that time. The Faslane Peace Camp was established in 1982.

The 1982 Labour Party Conference adopted a platform calling for the removal of the cruise missiles, the scrapping of Polaris and the cancellation of Trident. This was reaffirmed by the 1986 conference. While the party was given little chance of winning the 1983 election in the aftermath of the Falklands War, polls had shown Labour ahead of the Conservatives in 1986 and 1987. In the wake of Labour's unsuccessful performance in the 1987 election, the Labour Party leader, Neil Kinnock, despite his own unilateralist convictions, moved to drop the party's disarmament policy, which he saw as a contributing factor in its defeat. The party formally voted to do so in October 1989.

In Scotland there was opposition to the basing of the US Polaris submarines at Holy Loch in 1961. The development of the longer-range Trident missile made US ballistic missile submarine bases in the UK unnecessary, and the US Polaris boats were withdrawn in 1992. Opposition to nuclear weapons became associated with Scottish national identity. By the 1980s, pro-independence Scottish political parties—the Scottish National Party (SNP), Scottish Green Party, Scottish Socialist Party (SSP) and Solidarity—were opposed to the basing of Polaris submarines so close to Glasgow, Scotland's largest city.

== Replacement ==
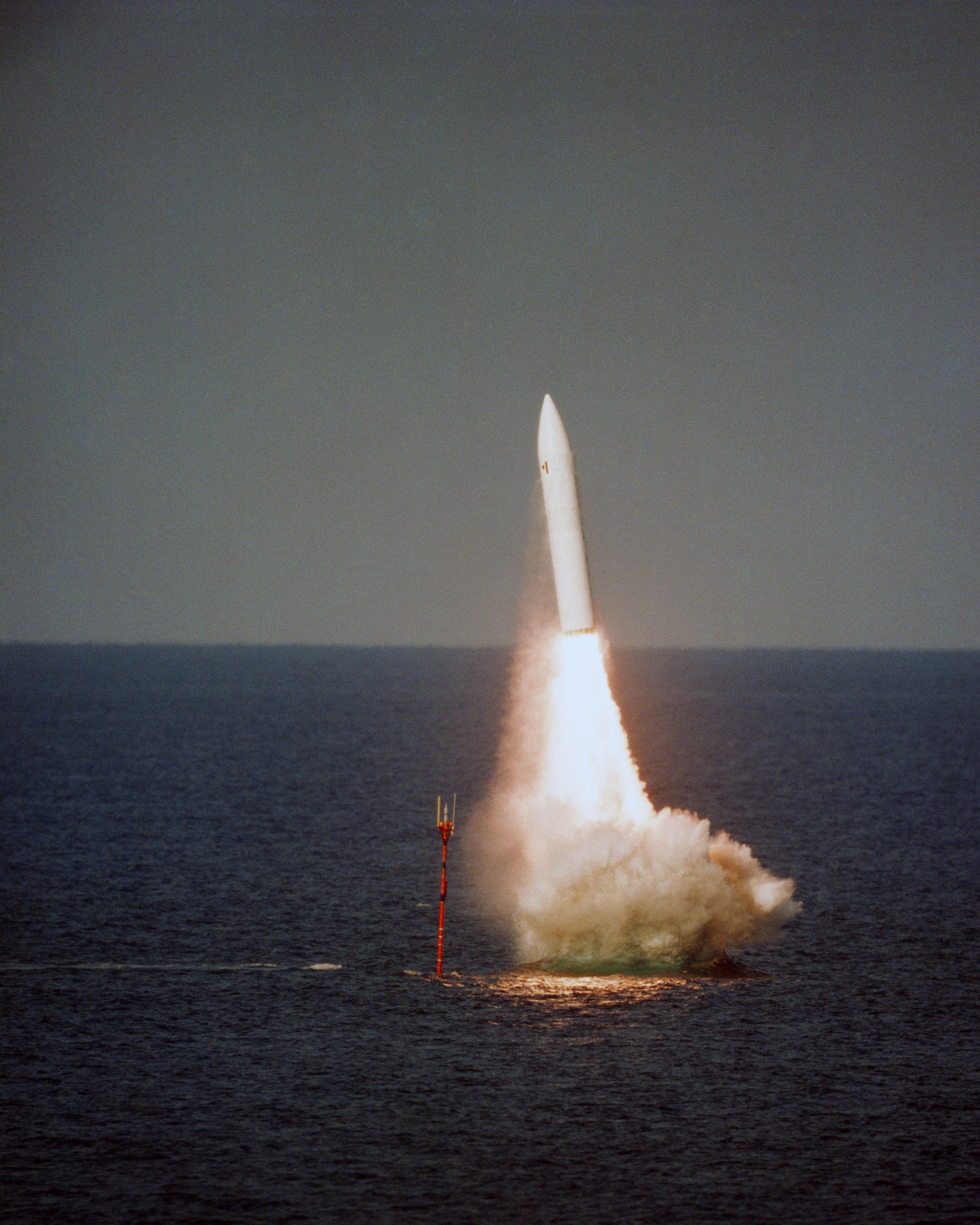
A Polaris missile is fired from the submerged HMS Revenge off the coast of Florida in 1986

On 15 July 1980, Pym announced the government's intention to acquire the Trident I C-4 missile then in service with the US Navy to replace Polaris. When the US government resolved to upgrade to the new Trident II D-5, the UK government, with the experience of Chevaline in mind, decided to purchase Trident II instead. The legal agreement took the form of amending the Polaris Sales Agreement through an exchange of notes between the two governments so that "Polaris" in the original now also covered the purchase of Trident.

Under the agreement, the UK purchased 65 Trident II missiles, They were drawn from a shared pool of weapons based at Naval Submarine Base Kings Bay in the United States. As with Polaris, the UK manufactured the warheads and Vanguard-class submarines in the UK, but unlike Polaris the US would maintain the missiles.

The first Trident patrol took place in December 1994, and the new boats were progressively introduced into service over the following six years. On 28 August 1996, there was a special ceremony at Faslane to mark the decommissioning of Repulse, the last operational Resolution-class submarine, and the end of the Polaris era. In his speech to mark the occasion, the Prime Minister, John Major, said:

We are here today to pay tribute to the work of the Polaris Force.

The debt we owe is very large. For the last 28 years this Force has mounted continuous patrols that have been vital to ensure this country's peace and security. Because of these patrols any possible aggressor has known that to attack the UK would provoke a terrible response.

In particular, we are here today to pay tribute to the last of the four Polaris submarines, HMS Repulse, which returned from her sixtieth and final deployment in May.

But not only Repulse, of course. I pay tribute, too, to the other three boats and their crews in her Class: the Resolution herself, Renown and Revenge. Each has made its own unique and invaluable contribution to the remarkable record of maintaining a Polaris submarine at sea, on deterrent patrol, undetected by friend or foe, every day, of every year, from 1969 until May this year.

During the 1960s, the V-bomber force had consumed up to 6 per cent of the total defence budget. A decade later, Polaris accounted for just 1.5 per cent. The total cost of the UK Polaris programme from December 1962, including running costs, through to 30 June 1974 came to £520 million. The four submarines cost £162 million, the missiles £53 million, and the base at Faslane, including the storage facility at Coulport, £47 million. Running costs were around £25 million per annum. Adjusting for inflation, the programme cost less than originally envisaged. This does not include Chevaline, which cost another £1 billion. That the project "was completed on time and on budget" was, The Daily Telegraph claimed, "an unprecedented feat in British naval history."
