= Quartz fiber dosimeter =

Type of radiation dosimeter

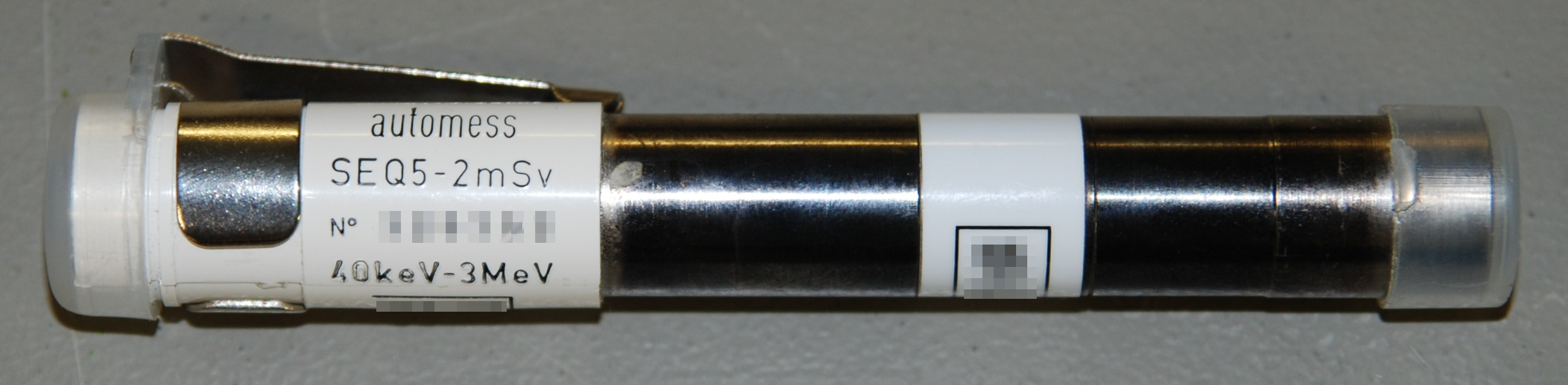
Quartz fiber radiation dosimeter, showing clip for securing it to clothing; normally a breast pocket.

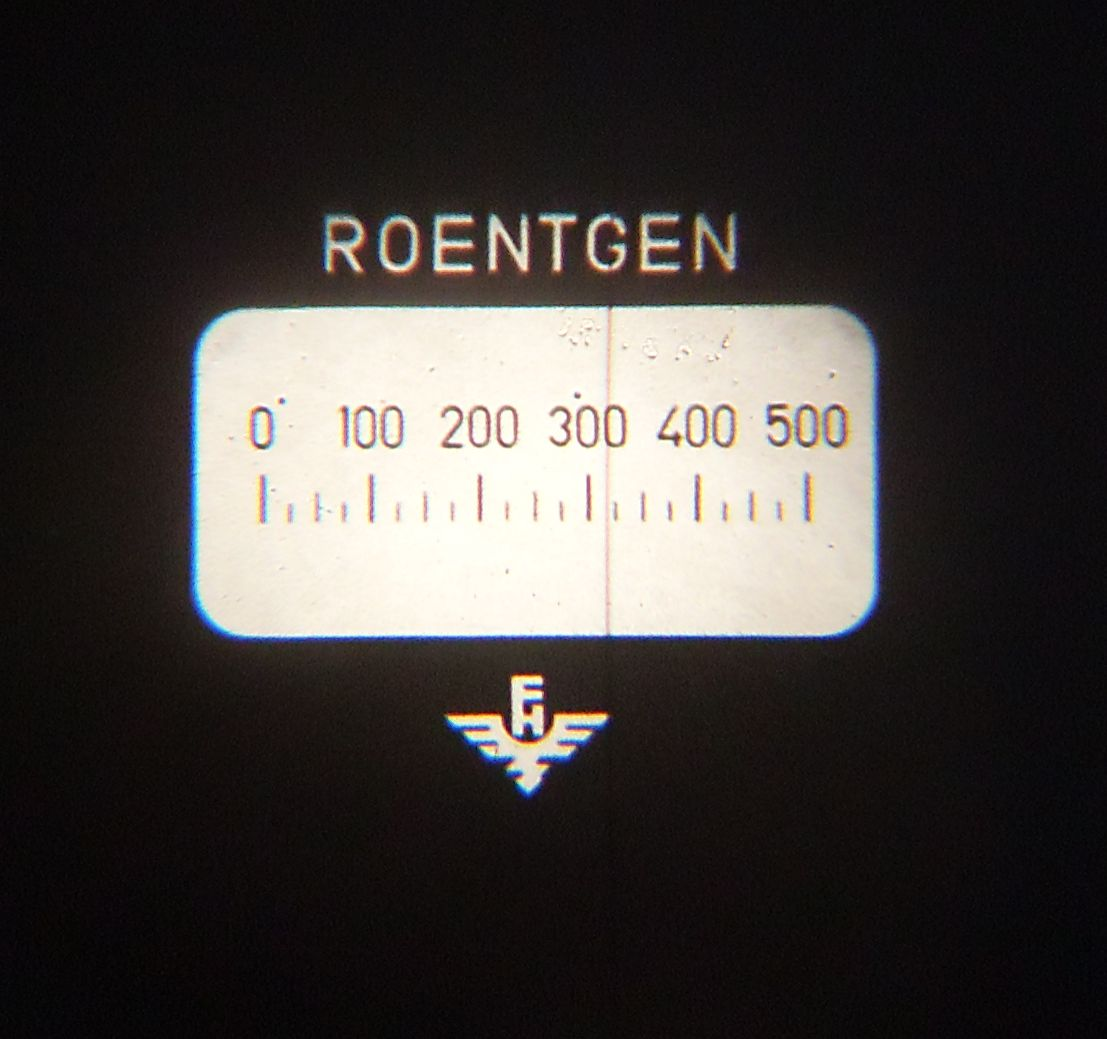
Display of quartz fiber dosimeter, in units of roentgen. Viewing is by holding the instrument towards an external light source and looking through the magnifying eyepiece.

A quartz fiber dosimeter, sometimes called a self indicating pocket dosimeter (SIPD) or self reading pocket dosimeter (SRPD) or quartz fibre electrometer (QFE), is a type of radiation dosimeter, a pen-like device that measures the cumulative dose of ionizing radiation received by the device, usually over one work period. It is clipped to a person's clothing, normally a breast pocket for whole body exposure, to measure the user's exposure to radiation.

It is now being superseded by more modern dosimeter types such as the electronic personal dosimeter (EPD).

== Use ==
As with other types of personal radiation dosimeter, it is worn by workers who are occupationally exposed to radiation, so their employers can keep a record of their exposure, to verify that it is below legally prescribed limits. It works by measuring the decrease in electrostatic charge on a metal conductor in an ionization chamber, due to ionization of the air in the chamber by radiation. It was invented in 1937 by Charles Lauritsen.

The dosimeter must be periodically recharged to restore it to a zero dose reading after being exposed to radiation. It is normally read immediately after use, and the dose is logged to record the user's exposure. In some organizations, possession of the recharging device is limited to health physicists to ensure accurate recording of exposures. It contains a low-power microscope and an illumination lens which allow direct reading of exposure at any time by aiming the illumination lens at a light source and looking into the microscope.

The device is mainly sensitive to gamma and x-rays, but it also detects beta radiation above 1 MeV. Neutron sensitive versions have been made.

Quartz fiber dosimeters are made in different ranges. Peace-time occupational exposure ranges usually measure up to 500 mrem (5 mSv), which exceeds the normal US yearly dose of 360 mrem (3.6 mSv). War-time fallout meters measure up to 500 rem (5 Sv), roughly the lethal dose.

The quartz fiber device is an older dosimeter design. It suffers from these disadvantages:

- Low accuracy: Because of the analog mechanical design, accuracy is around 15%, less than other dosimeters.
- Reading errors: Since it can only be read manually it is prone to human reading errors.
- Small dynamic range: The range of the device is limited by the charge on the electrode. Once the charge is gone the device stops recording exposure. This means unexpected large radiation doses can quickly saturate devices designed to monitor the more usual low level exposures.

Susceptibility to moisture is dealt with by separating the charging pin from the ion chamber by a small gap. The device is pushed firmly onto the charger, closing the gap and allowing the dosimeter to be reset. Releasing the dosimeter disconnects the charger pin from the ion chamber but does induce a small change in the zero which is relatively unpredictable.

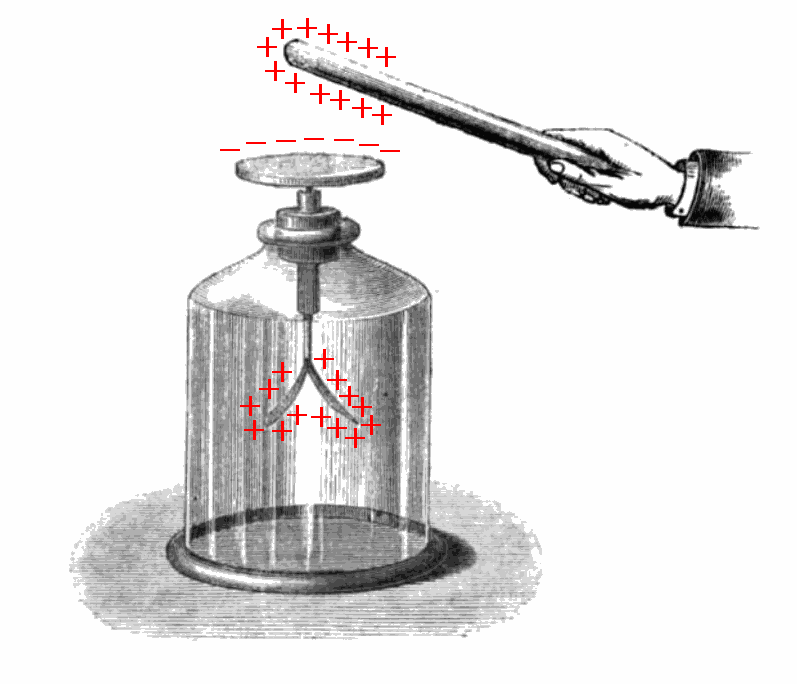
Gold leaf electroscope showing principle of fiber dosimeter. When ionizing radiation penetrates the inner gas of the electroscope, ions are created. Since the gold leaves are charged positive, the negative ions are attracted to it and neutralize some of the charge, thus causing the gold leaves to close together.

== Theory of operation ==
The quartz fiber dosimeter is a rugged form of a device called a Lauritsen electroscope. It consists of a sealed air-filled cylinder called an ionization chamber. Inside it is a metal electrode strip that is attached to a terminal on the end of the pen for recharging. The other end of the electrode has a delicate gold-plated quartz fiber attached to it, which at rest lies parallel to the electrode. The ends of the chamber are transparent and the microscope is focused on the fiber.

During recharging, the charger applies a high DC voltage, usually around 150–200 volts, to the electrode, charging it with electrostatic charge. The quartz fiber, having the same charge, is repelled by the surface of the electrode due to the coulomb force and bends away from the electrode. After charging, the charge remains on the electrode because it is insulated.

When a particle of ionizing radiation passes through the chamber, it collides with molecules of air, knocking electrons off them and creating positively and negatively charged atoms (ions) in the air. The ions of opposite charge are attracted to the electrode and neutralize some of the charge on it. The reduced charge on the electrode reduces the force on the fiber, causing it to move back toward the electrode. The position of the fiber can be read through the microscope. Behind the fiber is a scale graduated in units of radiation, with the zero point at the position of the fiber when it is fully charged.

Since each radiation particle allows a certain amount of charge to leak off the electrode, the position of the fiber at any time represents the cumulative radiation that has passed through the chamber since the last recharge. Recharging restores the charge that was lost and returns the fiber to its original deflected position.

The charger is a small box, usually powered by a battery. It contains an electronic circuit that steps the battery voltage up to the high voltage needed for charging. The box has a fixture that requires one to press the end of the dosimeter on the charging electrode. Some chargers include a light to illuminate the measurement electrode, so that measurement, logging and recharging can occur with one routine motion.

Units with larger ranges are made by adding a capacitor attached between the electrode and the case. The capacitor stores a larger amount of charge on the device for a given voltage on the electrode. Since each radiation particle allows a fixed amount of charge to escape, a larger number of radiation particles is required to move the fiber a given amount.

== Pocket ionization chamber ==
A version of the above dosimeter without the self-reading capabilities, called a pocket ionization chamber or just pocket chamber, was widely used in World War II and postwar government and military projects, particularly the Manhattan Project. This consisted of a simple ionization chamber with an electrode running down the center, but no electroscope for reading. Instead the exposure was read by plugging the device into a separate precision electrometer/charger, which measured the decline in charge on the electrode and displayed it on a meter, before recharging the electrode. These had the advantage that they were simpler, more rugged, and cheaper than the electrometer type, but had the disadvantage (considered desirable in some military applications) that the exposure couldn't be read by the wearer without the electrometer/charger. They are no longer used.

== Rate meter ==
A similar device, used with the same charger, is a rate meter. This is an inexpensive method for civil defense persons to measure radiation rates. One measures the rate of change of the rate meter for a timed exposure after charging the rate meter. Usually one measures heavy fallout of a thirty-second period, and light fallout over a ten-minute period. The rate meter has two internal scales that read the radiation flux directly in rems for each period.

== See also ==
- Geiger counter
- Scintillation counter
