= Quartz fiber =

Fiber created from high purity quartz crystals

Quartz fiber is a fiber created from high-purity quartz crystals. It is made by first softening quartz rods (in an oxyhydrogen flame) and then creating filaments from the rods. Since the creation of high-purity quartz crystals is an energy intensive process, quartz fiber is more expensive than alternatives (glass fiber and high-silica fiber) and has limited applications.

== Manufacture ==
Quartz fiber is made from heating quartz rods with an oxyhydrogen flame. Then, filaments are drawn out of the quartz rod, creating quartz fibers. For optical fibers, germanium and phosphorus can be added to increase the refractive index. In general, quartz fiber is made of 99.95% purity of silicon dioxide.

== Properties ==
A single quartz fiber can have a tensile strength of 5.5 gigapascals (800 ksi). Quartz fibers are chemically stable as they are not affected by halogens (for the most part). Quartz fibers also have a higher thermal resistance than S-glass or E-glass. Quartz fiber also has a low coefficient of thermal expansion.

== Applications ==
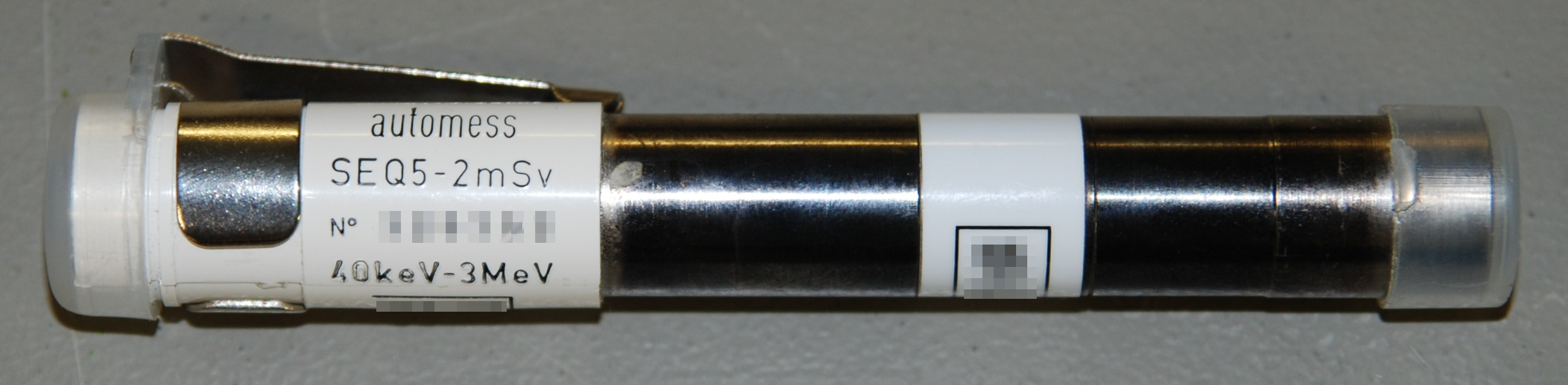
A quartz fiber dosimeter, a device using a quartz fiber.

Since quartz fiber is expensive, it has limited applications. It is used mainly for producing composite materials (due to having higher stability compared to glass fiber) and in electrical applications where thermal resistance and dielectric properties are important. It can be used in filtration applications where alternatives such as glass fiber filters cannot be used. Quartz fiber can also be used for physical devices (such as in quartz fiber dosimeters and quartz fiber electrometers).

Quartz fibers can be used in fiber optics. This is due to a quartz fiber having the ability to transport data at a speed of 1 terabit per second, and having a transmission loss of 1 decibel per kilometer.

Similar to how fiberglass can be made, quartz fiber can be used to make composite materials by combining with a resin. The fiber can be weaved into a cloth ("quartz cloth", "silica cloth"), or chopped to a uniform length. Three-dimensional quartz phenolic is an example of such a material.

== See also ==
- Fused quartz
- Quartz fiber dosimeter
