= ET.317 =

British thermonuclear weapon

ET.317 was a thermonuclear weapon of the British Royal Navy, developed for the UK version of the UGM-27 Polaris missile.

== Development ==
The US Polaris A-3T warhead was the US W58. Britain considered but never used the W58 because the British safety authorities considered it unsafe in several respects. Instead they fitted a hybrid of a US W59 fusion secondary, triggered by a new British primary based on a Cleo boosted-fission device tested in Nevada as PAMPAS and TENDRAC. Variants of this basic design were used or intended for several other delivery systems, including the WE.177 bomb, UK Skybolt ALBM, and the Blue Water tactical ballistic missile, and several others.

Documents declassified and released into the public domain in 2012 disclose that ET.317 was a warhead that used the fission-fusion-fission process, where a boosted-fission device codenamed Jennie triggered a fusion secondary codenamed Reggie which in turn was encased in depleted uranium. In the conditions created in the fusion process, vast quantities of free neutrons are liberated, and the normally unfissionable uranium-238 casing fissions. This results in a smaller, lighter, cheaper, dirtier weapon than one using only a fission-fusion process. Fission of the depleted uranium casing can generate a significant proportion of total weapon yield, and compared to other fissile material U-238 is cheap and plentiful as a waste product from HEU manufacture. Jennie was based on the Cleo device tested at PAMPAS and TENDRAC. Reggie was based on the US W59 fusion secondary.

Since the Reggie secondary manufactured in the UK from British-owned materials was a copy of the US W59, by implication, the W59 thermonuclear weapon deployed in some Minuteman I ICBMs also used the fission-fusion-fission process.

Although the physical dimensions of ET.317 are not themselves declassified, publicly available information has allowed an estimate to be produced of the reentry vehicle of 509 millimetres (20.0 in) wide at the nose, 663 millimetres (26.1 in) wide before the skirt and 1,800 millimetres (71 in) from the nose to the start of the skirt.

The yield of ET.317 was stated in official documents on many occasions to be 200 kt. When retired, the Reggie fusion secondary was recycled and reused in its successor, the Chevaline warhead, matched to a new boosted-fission trigger codenamed Harriet. In that form, it is claimed to yield 225 kt, although there are as yet no official sources for that claim. Because the Chevaline warheads numbered two per missile, rather than the previous three ET.317 warheads, the surplus warheads were dismantled and while Jennie was no longer required, some Reggie secondaries were refurbished and installed as the secondary in WE.177C aircraft-delivered tactical nuclear bombs.
