= Three-dimensional quartz phenolic =

Three-dimensional quartz phenolic (3DQP) is a phenolic-based material composed of a quartz cloth material impregnated with a phenolic resin and hot-pressed. When cured, 3DQP can be machined in the same way as metals and is tough and fire-resistant. 3DQP is used for the manufacture of nuclear weapon re-entry vehicles (RV).

The quartz material 'hardens' the RV protecting the nuclear warhead against high-energy neutrons emitted by exo-atmospheric Anti-ballistic missile (ABM) bursts before re-entry.

3DQP was first used on the British Chevaline improved front end (IFE) for the Royal Navy's UGM-27 Polaris system that was in service from 1982 to 1996, when it was replaced by Trident D5.

== Manufacture ==
A licence to manufacture 3DQP in the US was acquired from the British Government and production was undertaken by AVCO, one of the two suppliers of US RVs, the other being General Electric. First production examples of the Chevaline ReBs were manufactured by AVCO, now part of Textron. Subsequently, production was undertaken in the UK at the Royal Ordnance Factory Burghfield using quartz material purchased from France. Documents declassified in 2013 describe in some detail the process whereby a quartz two-dimensional cloth is hand woven from quartz threads with conventional wefts and warps within a stainless steel matrix before being impregnated under pressure with a phenolic resin. A third dimension was then woven through the cavities created by removal of the stainless steel matrix before these threads were impregnated with phenolic resin inside an autoclave pressurised at up to 2000 psi. The resulting material was then lathe-turned to the ReB profile, internally and externally.

The supply by AVCO of test samples of 3DQP to France without UK permission caused friction between the British Government and AVCO, and action in the US courts by the British Government.

== See also ==
- Chevaline
- Fiberglass
- Nuclear weapons and the United Kingdom
- UGM-27 Polaris
- Resolution-class submarine
- Atmospheric reentry
