= Penetration aid =

Intercontinental ballistic missile device

A penetration aid (or "penaid") is a device or tactic used to increase a flying object's capability of reaching its target without detection, and in particular to improve an intercontinental ballistic missile (ICBM) warhead's chances of penetrating a target's defenses.

The category of penaids includes physical devices carried within the ICBM (as part of its payload), as well as tactics that accompany its launch or flight path, operating as either passive or active counters. Penaids may include one or more of the following concepts:

- The missile booster can have a short burn time, and/or (if existing) the MIRV bus carrying the nuclear warheads can have some form of stealth technology, thereby hindering detection before the warhead reentry vehicles are released.
- MIRV and MRV (instead of single warhead missiles) themselves largely improve penetration since there are many more warheads to destroy than missiles, which may saturate a defensive system's stock of weapons. However, these technologies are very demanding since they require the ability to highly miniaturize both the physics package inside, such as the Teller–Ulam design used in most US and NATO "staged" fission–fusion (thermonuclear) weapons, as well as including the warheads themselves and, for MIRVed warheads, to master the art of accurately dispensing each warhead and possibly other payload elements (penaids, etc.) in what is often designated as the post-boost phase or payload deployment phase.
- Incidental or deliberate fragmentation of the final-stage rocket booster can cloud the enemy's radar by projecting a radar cross-section much larger than the actual missile and/or creating a large number of false tracks.
- Chaff may be deployed over a large area of space, creating a large, radar-reflecting object that will obscure incoming warheads from defensive radar.
- Cosmosols – heterogeneous (non-uniform) systems of solid particles, ranging in size from 10-3 to n.10 cm, suspended in outer space. Depending on their purpose, cosmosols can be camouflaging or protective. Camouflaging cosmosols are used to conceal the telltale signs of spacecraft (SC) and rocket warheads in a wide range of electromagnetic waves, to imitate false space targets, while protective ones are used to protect SC and warheads from beam weapons (laser and beam). The camouflaging properties of cosmosols are based on their ability to reflect, absorb and emit electromagnetic waves in the optical, thermal, millimeter and centimeter ranges. The protective properties depend on the ability of cosmosol particles to absorb electromagnetic waves from laser weapons both in the solid state and when they transition to the gaseous phase as a result of heating by the absorbed energy. Protection from beam weapons is provided by the property of cosmosols to absorb and weaken the flow of particles, neutral hydrogen atoms or electrons. Devices for using cosmosols are placed on board the spacecraft or the warhead of the rocket and are activated in advance.
- Radar jammers are active radio transmitters that can be deployed on the decoys and the warhead to jam the frequencies used by defensive radars or literally blind them from seeing any warheads around.
- Plasma shield for plasma stealth.
- Decoys such as mylar balloons that can be inflated in space and are designed to have the same radar characteristics as the warhead. As the warhead and the decoy balloons may be at different temperatures, the warhead and the balloons may both be surrounded by heated shrouds that put them all at the same temperature. This defeats attempts to discriminate between decoys and warheads on the basis of temperature, which can confuse an enemy's missile defense systems.
- Reentry decoys, consisting of very small reentry bodies that mimic the decelerating trajectory and radar signature of a warhead during atmospheric reentry, forcing the defense system to spend many interceptor weapons on fake targets instead of on warheads.
- Decoys equipped with cosmosols (analogous to aerosols) in space. Capable of concealing warheads and decoys in the optical, infrared and radar ranges, as well as protecting against beam weapons.
- Kinetic energy weapon cluster warheads (ready-made striking elements in the form of rods and submunitions) and protective shield. They are designed to destroy kinetic interceptors in space and in the transition (before entering the atmosphere) section of the trajectory. They were first mentioned in a book co-authored by Yuri Solomonov, chief designer of the Topol-M, YARS, and Bulava missile-systems.
- Nuclear radar blackout over the target area can be created: in a first-use decapitation strike, one thermonuclear device may be deliberately exploded in space by the attacker, in order to provide a total radar (and partial or total communications) blackout lasting several minutes per detonation (length of time varies by weapon yield) that will allow subsequent warheads and delivery vehicles to pass through an enemy's defenses undetected.
- Maneuvering reentry vehicles MARV (instead of symmetrically shaped warheads) induce lateral drag during reentry and hence strongly bend the trajectory, thus deceiving lower-altitude interceptor systems that generally assume a straight decelerating trajectory and which have a limited terminal guidance maneuverability and course-correction capability (especially hit-to-kill or conventional warhead interceptors). This has some penalty in terms of decreased attacking warhead accuracy on the target (unless the reentry vehicle has an active guidance and control system on board, which is quite complex to master).

Carrying such devices has a price in terms of payload weight and volume, which requires a compromise versus warhead size and numbers on board, as well as missile range.

== See also ==
- Chevaline
- Stealth aircraft
