= W59 =

American thermonuclear missile warhead

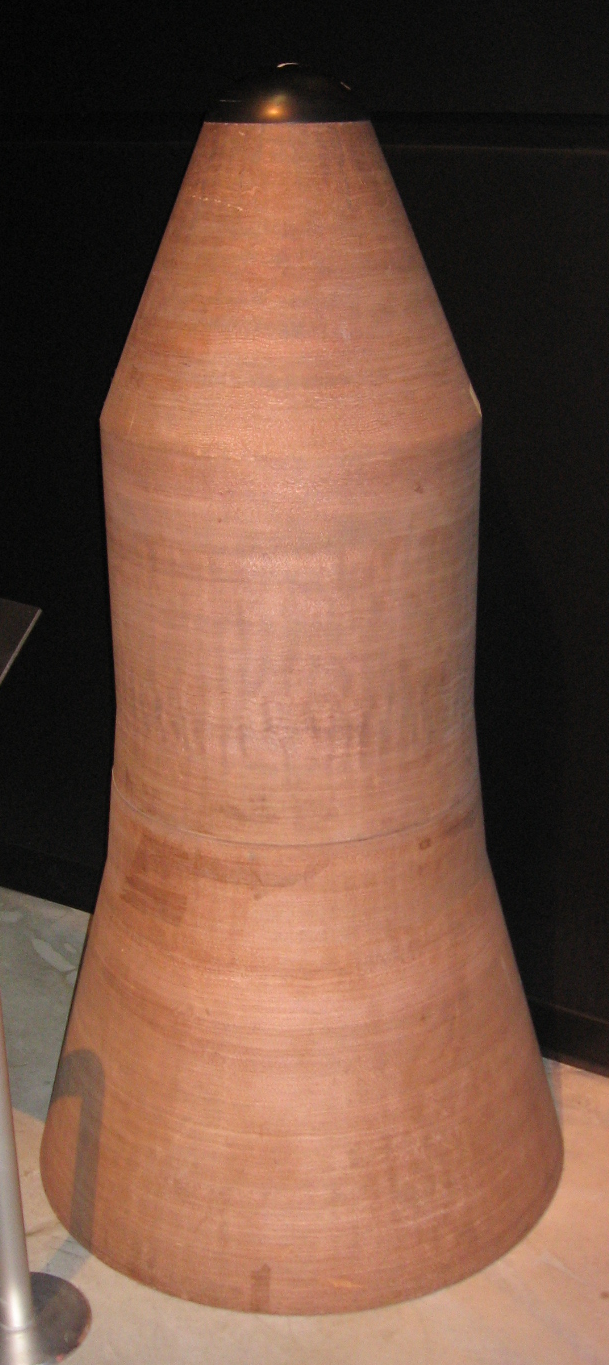
- The Mark 5 Reentry Vehicle (Note: Not to be confused with the Mark 5 reentry body (RB) used by the US Navy.) that housed the W59 warhead
- Type: Nuclear warhead

Service history
- In service: 1962 to 1969
- Used by: United States

Production history
- Designer: Los Alamos National Laboratory

Specifications
- Mass: 550 pounds (250 kg)
- Length: 47.8 inches (121 cm)
- Width: 16.3 inches (41 cm)
- Detonation mechanism: Contact, airburst
- Blast yield: 800 kilotonnes of TNT (3,300 TJ)

The W59 was an American thermonuclear warhead used on some Minuteman I ICBM missiles from 1962 to 1969, and planned to be used on the cancelled GAM-87 Skybolt air-launched ballistic missile. A British development of the system using a new primary became the WE.177, which was widely deployed as an air-dropped weapon into the 1990s.

== History ==
=== Minuteman application ===
Development of the Minuteman I ICBM was authorized in February 1958 and by March, the study of possible warhead for the new ICBM was completed. In April, the XW-56 warhead designed by Lawrence Radiation Laboratory (now Lawrence Livermore National Laboratory) was approved for development. This program required considerable effort and was accompanied by funding issues.

Though the intermediate details and dates remain classified, at some point during or before December 1960, a second Minuteman warhead was authorized with a planned first production date of July 1962 and a full scale production date of December 1962. In March 1961, the XW-59 nomenclature was accepted for this warhead.

Firing set components would be off-the-shelf items repackaged for the special shape required for the role. The warhead would contain no electrical power, with an externally powered rotary chopper provided to charge the weapon's X-unit. An inertial switch would be provided to prevent weapon arming before it experienced its launch environment. In December 1960, it was decided to use the environmental sensing device (ESD) from the XW-56 in the XW-59.

In January 1961, the Mark 5 reentry vehicle (RV) joint working group, already assigned the task of mating the XW-56 to the Mark 5 were also given the task of fitting the XW-59 to the RV. In May, a second working group for the Mark 11 RV was formed. The plan was to introduce the Mark 11 into service in January 1963 with the eventual replacement of all Mark 5 RVs with Mark 11s.

In May 1961 it was noted that the weapon's RV and fuzing system would be developed by Avco while Sandia National Laboratories would be responsible for the firing set, external initiators, ESD and housing and mounting structures. The warhead would also be compatible with the Skybolt application and that all electrical components, except the external initiators, were already in production. Safety was assured by not having any source of power in the warhead, the use of ESDs, and that two firing signals in the correct order had to be received to detonate the weapon.

Flight tests of the weapon were conducted in late 1961 and the Mark 59 Mod 0 warhead was design released in December 1961. Though the Minuteman missile's operational availability date was pushed from July to September 1962, the warhead's first production date remained unchanged and the first warhead was delivered on schedule in June 1962.

The final development report for the Mark 59 Mod 0 noted that the warhead met all the design specification, with some still classified exceptions.

A total of 150 W59 warheads were produced from June 1962 to July 1963. All warheads were retired by June 1969.

=== Skybolt application ===
Search for a suitable warhead for the Skybolt missile began in March 1960. The requirements included a first production date of July 1963 and that the weapon could be made in large numbers. In April 1960 a study group met to determine a suitable design compatible with Skybolt. The operational deployment date was scheduled for July 1963.

During this study group, it was determined that the XW-56-derived ESD used in the XW-59 would be unsuitable for the Skybolt application due to the requirement for free-fall drop delivery option. In March 1961, the Skybolt joint working group met and concluded the initial July 1963 deployment date was unrealistic as flight tests of the weapon had still not been conducted. Further, due to the need for a special ESD, the XW-59 warhead for Skybolt was renamed the XW-59-X1.

As the production date for Skybolt began to slip, first flight tests were scheduled for December 1963. Sandia objected to the planned program of only two flights, wanting eight to twelve test flights instead. In August 1961, first production date for Skybolt was rescheduled to April 1964 at Sandia's request.

In December 1962, all effort on the XW-59-X1 was halted, and in March 1963 the Skybolt program and its warhead were cancelled.

== Design ==
The W59 was 16.3 inches (41 cm) in diameter and 47.8 inches (121 cm) long, and it weighed 550 pounds (250 kg). From official documents, it had a design yield of 800 kilotonnes of TNT (3,300 TJ). (Note: The report states that the 550 lb (250 kg) warhead for Minuteman has a yield of 800 kilotonnes of TNT (3,300 TJ) and the 600 lb (270 kg) warhead had a yield of 1,200 kilotonnes of TNT (5,000 TJ). The W59 is the only 550lb warhead for Minuteman.) The weapon had both contact and airburst fuzing modes.

The W59 was one of five nuclear weapon designs identified by researcher Chuck Hansen as using the common design Tsetse primary. Hansen's research indicates that the Tsetse primary was used in the US B43 nuclear bomb, W44 nuclear warhead, W50 nuclear warhead, B57 nuclear bomb, and W59.

Historical evidence indicates that these weapons shared a reliability problem, which Hansen attributes to miscalculation of the reaction cross section of tritium in fusion reactions. The weapons were not tested as extensively as some prior models due to the 1958 to 1961 test moratorium, and the reliability problem was discovered and fixed after the moratorium ended. This problem was apparently shared by the Python primary designs.

== See also ==
- WE.177
- List of nuclear weapons
- Teller-Ulam design
