= Weapon System =

US military designation scheme

Weapon System was a United States Armed Forces military designation scheme for experimental weapons (e.g., WS-220) before they received an official name — e.g., under a military aircraft designation system. The new designator reflected the increasing complexity of weapons that required separate development of auxiliary systems or components.

In November 1949, the Air Force decided to build the Convair F-102 Delta Dagger around a fire-control system. This was "the real beginning of the weapon system approach [and the] aircraft would be integrated into the weapon system "as a whole from the beginning, so the characteristics of each component were compatible with the others".

Around February 1950, an Air Research and Development Command study prepared by Maj Gen Gordon P. Saville recommended that a 'systems approach' to new weapons be adopted [whereby] development of a weapon "system" required development of support equipment as well as the actual hardware itself."

The first WS designation was WS-100A.

US weapon programs were often begun as numbered government specifications such as an Advanced Development Objective (e.g., ADO-40) or a General Operational Requirement (e.g., GOR.80), although some programs were initially identified by contractor numbers (e.g., CL-282). (Note: When a government program number is not available, a contractor number (if available) is used in the table, e.g., Lockheed CL-282 for the U-2.)

== List of Weapon Systems ==
Key for numeric designations
Abbreviation	Meaning
CL	Lockheed Corporation
D	Douglas Aircraft Company
NA	North American Aviation
WS	Weapon System

List of weapon system programs for US military systems
Number	Project
WS-104A	SM-64 Navaho
WS-107A	SM-65 Atlas
WS-110	North American XB-70 Valkyrie
WS-117L (GOR.80)	Advanced Reconnaissance System (originally Project 1115); recoverable capsule - Pied Piper/Sentry/SAMOS; television transmission - unfeasible; Subsystem G: MiDAS
WS-119B (USAF 7795)	Bold Orion ASAT
WS-119L	Project Moby Dick (originally Project Genetrix)
WS-120A	BGM-75 AICBM
WS-124A	WS-124A Flying Cloud Project
WS-125	(B-72)
WS-133A	AN/DRC-8 Emergency Rocket Communications System (Program 494L) LGM-30 Minuteman
WS-199	Anti-satellite weapon
WS-199B	Bold Orion
WS-199C	High Virgo
WS-199D	Alpha Draco
WS-201A	1954 interceptor
WS-224A	Phase I: BMEWS, Phase II: Wizard missile system
WS-306A	Republic F-105 Thunderchief (misidentified as WS-3061)
WS315A	PGM-17 Thor missile
WS-324A	General Dynamics F-111
