= Air-launched ballistic missile =

Aircraft-deployed guided rocket weapon

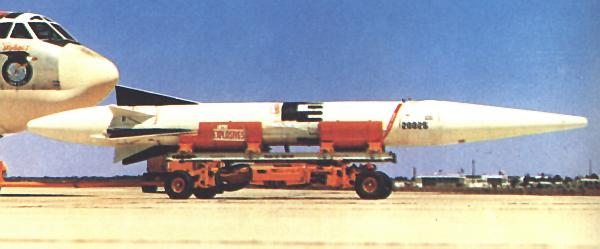
GAM-87 Skybolt

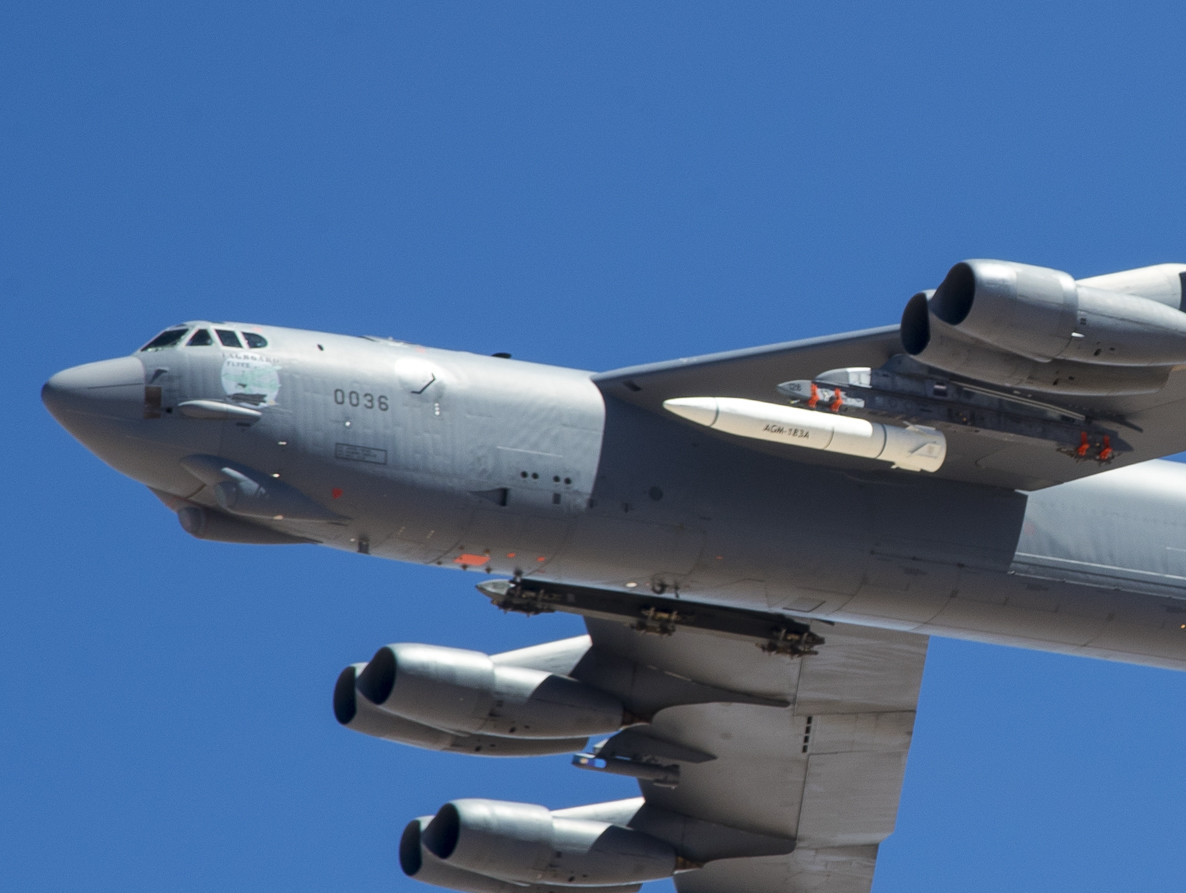
AGM-183 ARRW under the wing of a B-52

An air-launched ballistic missile (ALBM) is a ballistic missile that is launched from an aircraft. An ALBM allows the launch aircraft to stand off at long distances from its target, keeping it well outside the range of defensive weapons like anti-aircraft missiles and interceptor aircraft.

Historically, once launched, the missile was essentially immune to interception due to a lack of capable anti-ballistic missiles (ABM), with those few that did exist being limited to known static positions. This combination of features allowed a strategic bomber to present a credible deterrent second-strike option in an era when improving anti-aircraft defences appeared to be rendering conventional bombers obsolete. However, by the 1990s, surface-to-air missile technology had innovated to the point of allowing the interception of such weapons (especially in their terminal phase) from road mobile systems, albeit at a lower probability of kill (P_{k}). By the early 21st century, ABM systems from several nations had been deployed in significant numbers (with examples including upgraded MIM-104 Patriot and S-300, THAAD, SM-3, and S-400), spurring further innovation in hypersonic glide vehicles to penetrate such systems and keep ballistic missiles capable.

== Operational history ==
Minuteman Air Mobile Feasibility Demonstration (1970) de-classified official Strategic Air Command information film reel.

The ALBM concept was studied in the US as a way to ensure the usefulness and survivability of their large bomber fleet. After testing several experimental designs as part of the WS-199 efforts in the 1950s, the U.S. Air Force began development of the GAM-87 Skybolt missile with range on the order of 1,150 miles (1,850 km). The only other major force relying on strategic bombers was the Royal Air Force, who also selected the Skybolt to arm their V bomber fleet. The Soviet Union moved their strategic force directly to intercontinental ballistic missiles.

Skybolt ultimately failed several key tests, while the US Navy's UGM-27 Polaris offered the same advantages and more. Skybolt was cancelled, leading to the Skybolt crisis and an agreement to sell Polaris to the Royal Navy as part of the Nassau Agreement. The concept saw little active development until the 1970s when ICBM warheads began to become accurate enough to attack other ICBMs while they were still on the ground. The US carried out several experiments using existing missile designs dropped from cargo aircraft, but ultimately abandoned this line of research entirely. No further strategic ALBM development has been carried out by the US, and this class of missile never saw active use.

In March 2022, the Kinzhal was used for the first time in combat by Russia in Ukraine during its invasion of the country. Russia reportedly fired 72 Kinzhal missiles against Ukraine in 2024, typically using the MiG-31K interceptor aircraft. Ukraine claims interception rates, by the MIM-104 Patriot system, as high as one third to half.

In August 2024, the US Defense Intelligence Agency assessed that China had deployed a strategic nuclear-armed ALBM for use with its Xi'an H-6N bomber force. The weapon has the NATO reporting name CH-AS-X-13 and is believed to have a maneuverable reentry vehicle, with another possibility of an hypersonic glide vehicle.

Israel used its Rampage ALBM, launched from F-16I fighters, which was used in the April 2024 and October 2024 Israeli strikes on Iran, as well as December 2024 Israeli airstrikes in Yemen. Israel also carried out its September 2025 attack on Doha, the capital of Qatar, using ALBMs, firing them from the Red Sea, transiting outer space above Saudi Arabia.

== List of ALBMs ==
=== High Virgo ===
The High Virgo, also known as Weapons System 199C (WS-199C), was a prototype air-launched ballistic missile (ALBM) jointly developed by Lockheed and the Convair division of General Dynamics during the late 1950s. The missile proved moderately successful and aided in the development of the later GAM-87 Skybolt ALBM. It was also used in early tests of anti-satellite weapons.

=== WS-199B Bold Orion ===
Developed by Martin Aircraft, the Bold Orion missile was an air-launched ballistic missile, launched from the B-47 Stratojet medium bomber, with flight tests being carried out in 1958 and 1959. Early launches of the Bold Orion as a single-stage vehicle were unsuccessful, however a redesign as a two-stage weapon produced improved results, with the remainder of the 12-launch series establishing the ALBM as a viable vehicle. The final test flight trialed the Bold Orion missile as an anti-satellite missile, passing within 4 miles (6.4 km) of Explorer VI, the first-ever interception of a satellite.

=== GAM-87 Skybolt ===
The GAM-87 Skybolt, intended to be launched from Boeing B-52 Stratofortress and Avro Vulcan bombers, was in development by the United States Air Force (USAF), with the United Kingdom as a customer. In 1962, with technical difficulties and costs mounting, the program was cancelled, with the United States and the UK concentrating on the UGM-27 Polaris submarine-launched ballistic missile instead.

=== Air Mobile Feasibility test: C-5 w/ LGM-30 ===
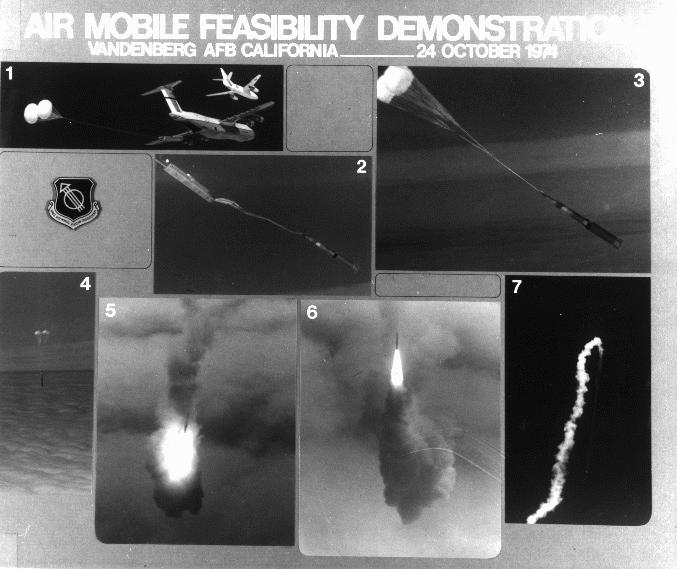
Air Mobile Feasibility demonstration, 24 October 1974

In the early 1970s, the USAF tested air-launching a Minuteman I/B ICBM from a C-5A Galaxy transport aircraft. On 24 October 1974, the Space and Missile Systems Organization successfully conducted an Air Mobile Feasibility test where a C-5A Galaxy aircraft air-dropped the 86,000-pound missile from 20,000 feet over the Pacific Ocean. The missile fell to 8,000 feet before its rocket engine fired. The 10-second engine burn carried the missile to 20,000 feet again before it dropped into the ocean. The test proved the feasibility of launching an intercontinental ballistic missile from the air. Operational deployment was discarded due to engineering and security difficulties, though the capability was used as a negotiating point in the Strategic Arms Limitation Talks.

=== Longbow ===
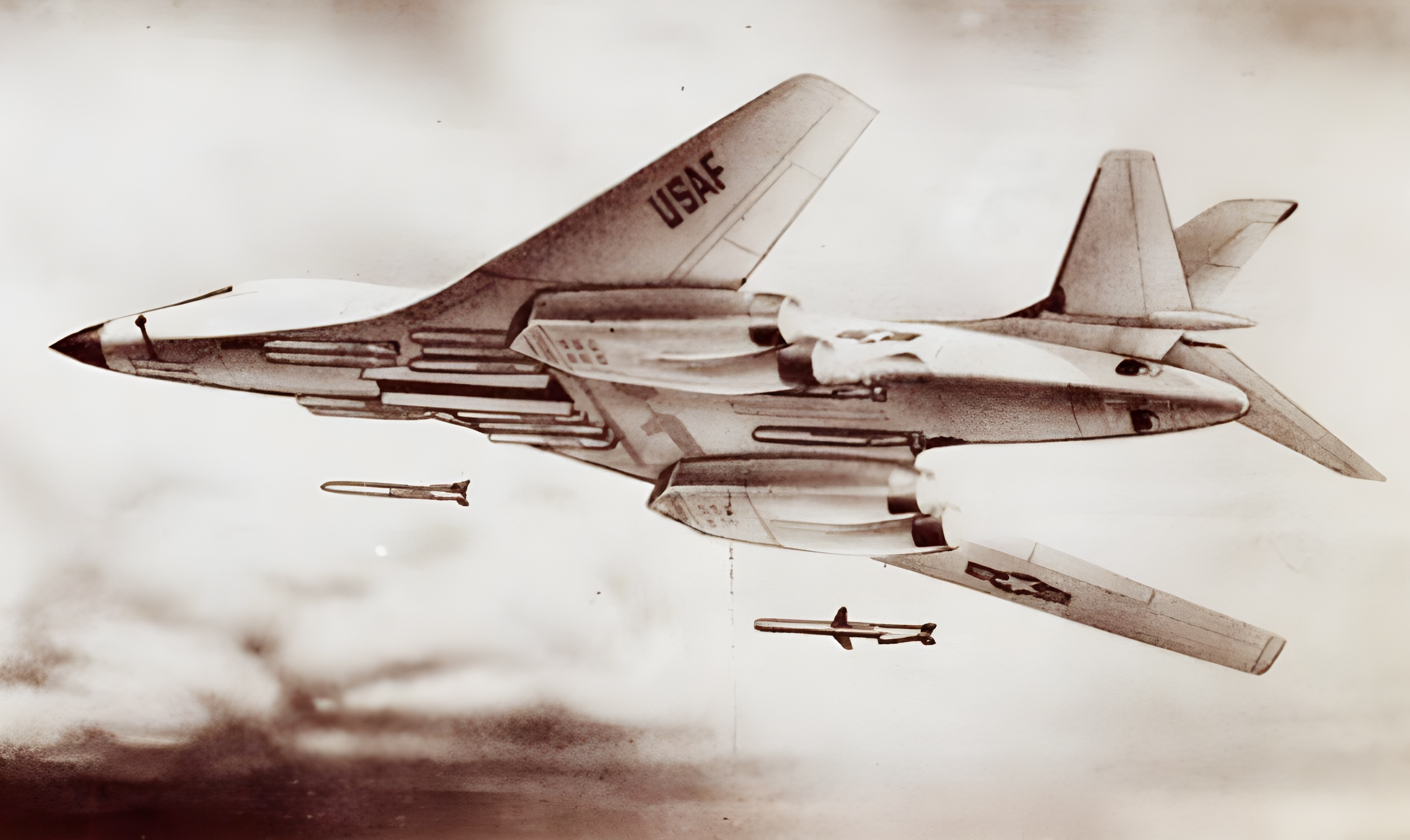
USAF concept art of a "Cruise Missile Carrying Aircraft" (CMCA) launching air-launched ballistic missiles or cruise missiles, possibly Longbow missiles

The Longbow ALBM was a late 1970s attempt by the USAF to create an air-launched ballistic missile which could be carried and launched by strategic bombers, such as the B-52 Stratofortress or a dedicated "Cruise Missile Carrying Aircraft" (often referred to as a "CMCA"). The missile was intended to serve as both an air-to-ground missile and ultra-long range air-to-air missile but was ultimately cancelled in the early 1980s.

=== Kh-47M2 Kinzhal ===
In 2018, Russia unveiled an air-launched ballistic missile called Kh-47M2 Kinzhal with a range of 2,000 km (1,200 mi). It is suspected to be a version of the Iskander missile. Earlier Soviet aero-ballistic missiles have a much shorter range, e.g. Kh-15 only has a range of 300 km (190 mi). In March 2022, the Kinzhal was used for the first time in combat by Russia in Ukraine during its invasion of the country.

=== Chinese missiles ===
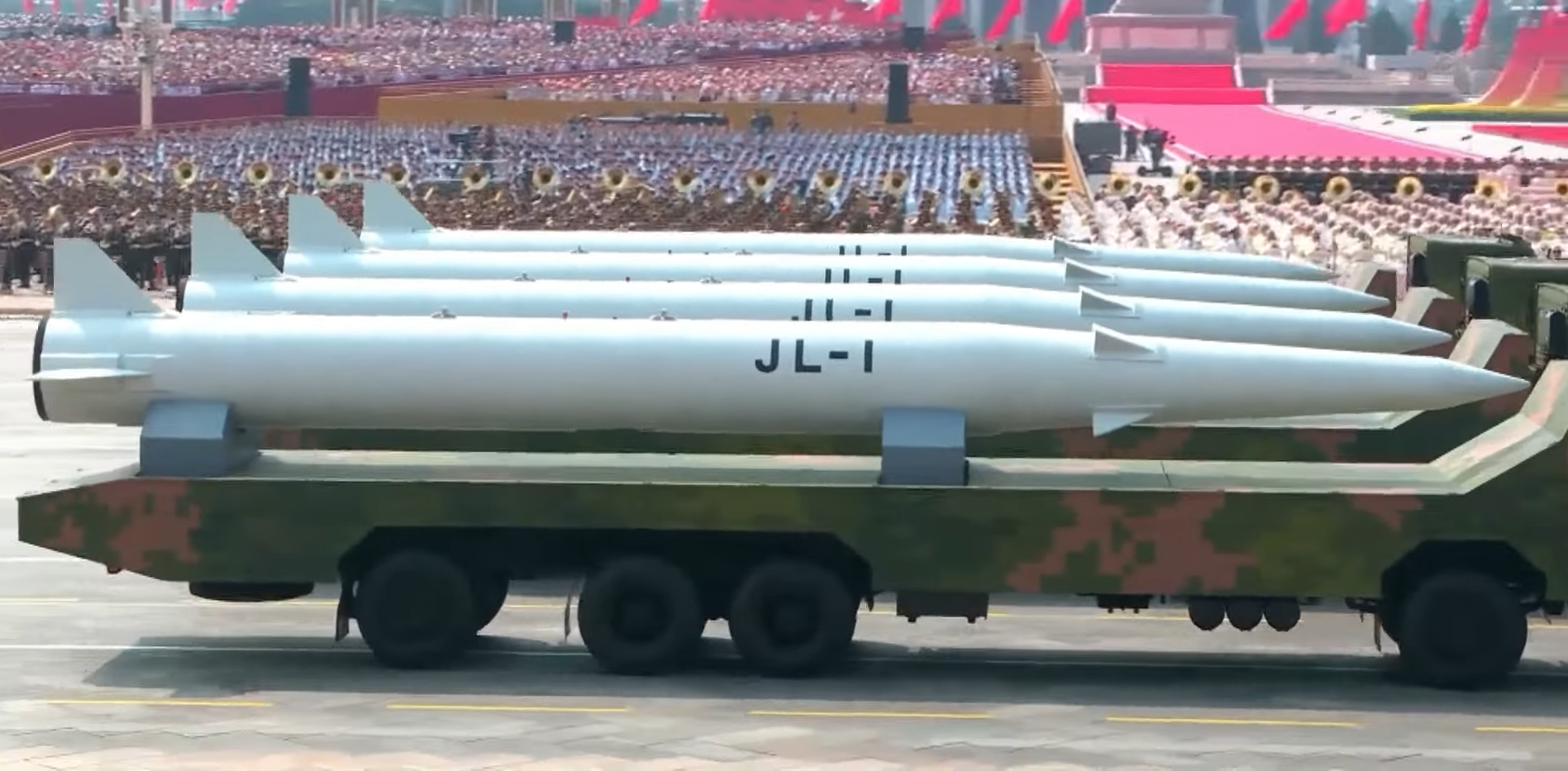
JL-1 air-launched ballistic missile

In March 2018, Defense Intelligence Agency chief Robert Ashley confirmed that China is developing two new air-launched ballistic missiles, one of which can carry a nuclear warhead. The H-6K bomber would be suited to launch such missiles. One of these missiles is a derivative of the DF-21 called the CH-AS-X-13 and has a range of 3,000 km.

In October 2020, a H-6 bomber was spotted at Neixiang Air Base landing with what appeared to be an air-launched ballistic missile similar to the DF-17.

- JL-1 (air-launched ballistic missile)
- YJ-21

=== Israeli Air LORA ===
In June 2024, Israel Aerospace Industries (IAI) unveiled an air-launched variant of the combat-proven LORA Tactical Ballistic Missile called Air LORA, meant for deep Stand-Off strike missions against strategic targets.

=== Sparrow target missile ===
The Israeli Sparrow target missile is used to test the Arrow anti-ballistic missile system.

== See also ==
- Air-launched cruise missile
- Intercontinental ballistic missile
- Nuclear weapons delivery
