= GAM-87 Skybolt =

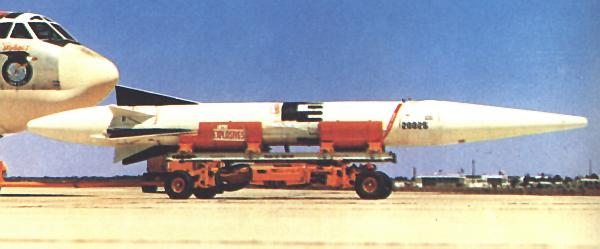
- Type: Air-launched ballistic missile Air-to-surface missile

Production history
- Manufacturer: Douglas Aircraft, Northrop

Specifications
- Mass: 11,000 pounds (5,000 kg)
- Length: 38 feet 3 inches (11.66 m)
- Diameter: 35 inches (890 mm)
- Wingspan: 5 feet 6 inches (1.68 m)
- Warhead: W59 thermonuclear weapon (1 megaton)
- Engine: Aerojet General two-stage solid-fuel rocket
- Operational range: 1,150 miles (1,850 km)
- Flight ceiling: 300 miles (480 km)
- Maximum speed: 9,500 miles per hour (15,300 km/h; Mach 12)
- Guidance system: inertial guidance
- Launch platform: Aircraft

The Douglas GAM-87 Skybolt, redesignated AGM-48 under the 1963 Tri-service system, was an air-launched ballistic missile (ALBM) developed by the United States during the late 1950s. The basic concept was to allow US strategic bombers to launch their weapons from well outside the range of Soviet defenses, as much as 1,000 miles (1,600 km) from their targets. To do this in an air-launched form, a lightweight thermonuclear warhead was needed. Initially, the W47 from the Polaris missile was selected, but it was later replaced by the W59 from the Minuteman missile.

The UK joined the Skybolt program in 1960, intending to use it on their V bomber force. When the design added a star tracker in addition to its inertial navigation system (INS) this meant that it could only be carried externally where the tracker could see the sky. This requirement, along with the required ground clearance on takeoff, limited it to the Avro Vulcan bomber. Several design decisions in the W47 led the RAF to question its safety, so they intended to use their own Red Snow warheads. This was a heavier warhead and would reduce the range to about 600 miles (970 km), meaning the bombers would have to cross the Soviet coastline to attack Moscow.

Testing began in 1962 and was initially marked by a string of failures. These failures, along with a lack of mission after the successful development of submarine-launched ballistic missiles (SLBMs), led to its cancellation in December 1962. The UK had decided to base its entire 1960s deterrent force on Skybolt, and its cancellation led to a major disagreement between the UK and US, known today as the "Skybolt Crisis". This was resolved by a series of meetings that led to the Royal Navy gaining the UGM-27 Polaris missile and construction of the Resolution-class submarines to launch them.

== History ==
=== Background ===
The US Air Force had built up an enormous fleet of strategic bombers during the 1950s, only to see them threatened by the possibility of a surprise attack by Soviet ICBMs. As the US bombers were located at only a small number of air bases, a relatively small fleet of missiles could attack all of them at once. The US had been developing its own ICBMs as well, but early models, like the SM-65 Atlas, required some time to prepare to launch from their surface launchers and were vulnerable to sneak air attack. A carefully timed attack from Soviet bombers against US missiles and their ICBMs against US bomber fields could inflict serious damage.

The one weapon system that was not open to attack was the US Navy's Polaris missile system. The Polaris equipped submarines could cruise in large areas of the Atlantic or Pacific where the Soviet fleet was unable to find them, and launch their missiles with impunity. If the goal of the nuclear force was to maintain deterrence by ensuring that a counterstrike would be launched, Polaris met this goal in a way the existing Air Force fleet could not. The possible loss of the nuclear role to the Navy was more worrying to the Air Force than the Soviet arsenal and generated a number of internal reports on how to deal with this threat to their dominance in the strategic field.

=== WS-199 and WS-138 ===
In response, in 1957 the Air Force began studying solutions to the "Puzzle of Polaris" under the WS-199 program. WS-199 was a grab-bag effort, studying anything that might improve the survivability of the Air Force strike capability. Primary among the concepts were two air-launched ballistic missiles, Bold Orion and High Virgo. These systems would give the Air Force a method somewhat similar to the Navy's; in times of high alert, the bomber force would be sent to holding positions far outside the range of any Soviet defenses, and then launch their missiles on command. Using aerial refueling, a bomber might be expected to be able to loiter for as long as a day.

This system had a major advantage compared to Polaris, as the aircraft could be sent radio instructions to retarget the missiles before launch. In theory, the bombers could be used as a second-strike weapon, attacking only those targets that had been missed in a first-strike, or alternately, being switched from counterforce to countervalue targets or vice versa. Ground-based systems like Atlas and Polaris lacked this ability, and could only be retargeted with a significant amount of effort. Even the latest Air Force design, the LGM-30 Minuteman, required changes in targeting data to be loaded from magnetic tape in a process that took several weeks.

WS-199 was generally successful, but the two ALBMs had a shorter range than desired. The Air Force tendered bids for a longer-range version in early 1959. Douglas Aircraft received the prime contract in May, and in turn subcontracted to Northrop for the guidance system, Aerojet for the propulsion system, and General Electric for the reentry vehicle. The system was initially known as WS-138A and was given the official name GAM-87 Skybolt in 1960.

=== British involvement ===
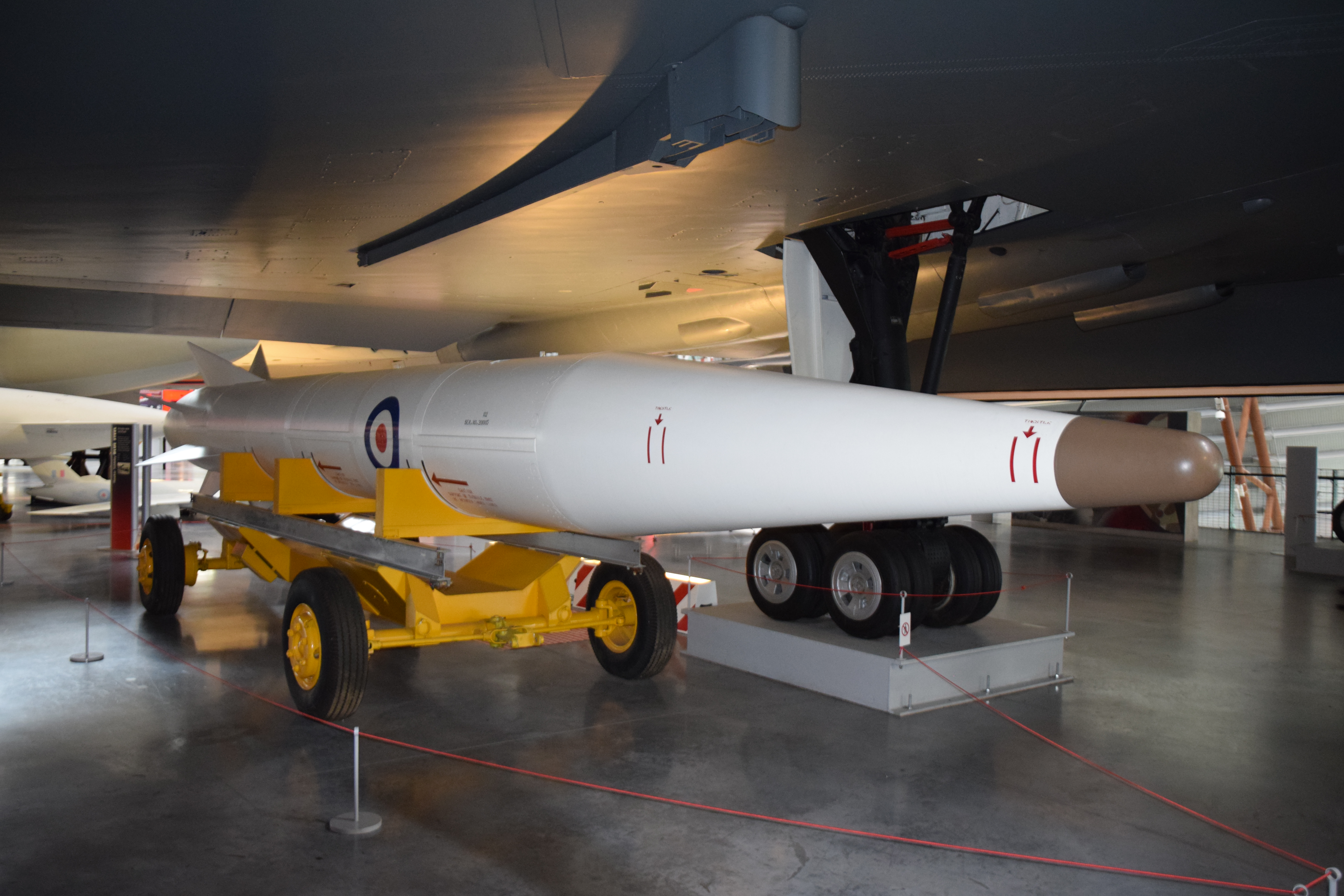
Skybolt at Royal Air Force Museum Midlands Showing the RAF roundel and the manufacturer (Douglas Aircraft) logo. It carries the tail-cone fairing that reduces drag in flight.

At the same time, the Royal Air Force (RAF) was having problems with their MRBM missile project, the Blue Streak, which was long overdue. Even if this was successful it faced the serious problem of basing. No fixed land-based missile system could be credibly installed in the British Isles; they were well within the range of Soviet air strikes. The limited land mass available meant it would be relatively easy for missile sites to be spotted no matter what security measures were taken, and flying time for a jet bomber from the coast to any potential inland location would be on the order of minutes.

This left the deterrent based on their own bomber force, the V bomber fleet, which the RAF had already long concluded would be unable to penetrate Soviet defenses by about 1960. The RAF was in the process of introducing their own stand-off missile, the 950 kilometres (590 mi) ranged Mach 3 Blue Steel. While capable, the missile flew at altitudes and speeds that left it vulnerable to improving SAMs, and it had a number of reliability and serviceability issues that made it less than ideal. A faster, longer-ranged version was being talked about, Blue Steel II, but it would be some time before it could enter service.

The long-range Skybolt would eliminate the need for both the Blue Streak and the Blue Steel II. Blue Steel II was canceled in December 1959 and the British Cabinet decided in February 1960 to cancel Blue Streak as well. Prime Minister Macmillan met President Eisenhower in March 1960 and agreed to purchase 144 Skybolts for the RAF. By agreement, British funding for research and development was limited to that required to modify the V bombers to take the missile, but the British were allowed to fit their own warheads. In exchange, the Americans were given nuclear submarine basing facilities in Scotland. Following the agreement, the Blue Streak program was formally canceled in April 1960 and in May 1960 an agreement for an initial order of 100 Skybolts was concluded.

Avro was made an associate contractor to manage the Skybolt program for the United Kingdom and four different schemes were submitted to find a platform for the missile. A number of different aircraft were considered, including a variant of the Vickers VC10 airliner and two of the current V bombers, the Avro Vulcan and Handley Page Victor. It was decided to use the Vulcan to initially carry two missiles each on hardpoints outboard of the main landing gear.

=== Development and testing ===
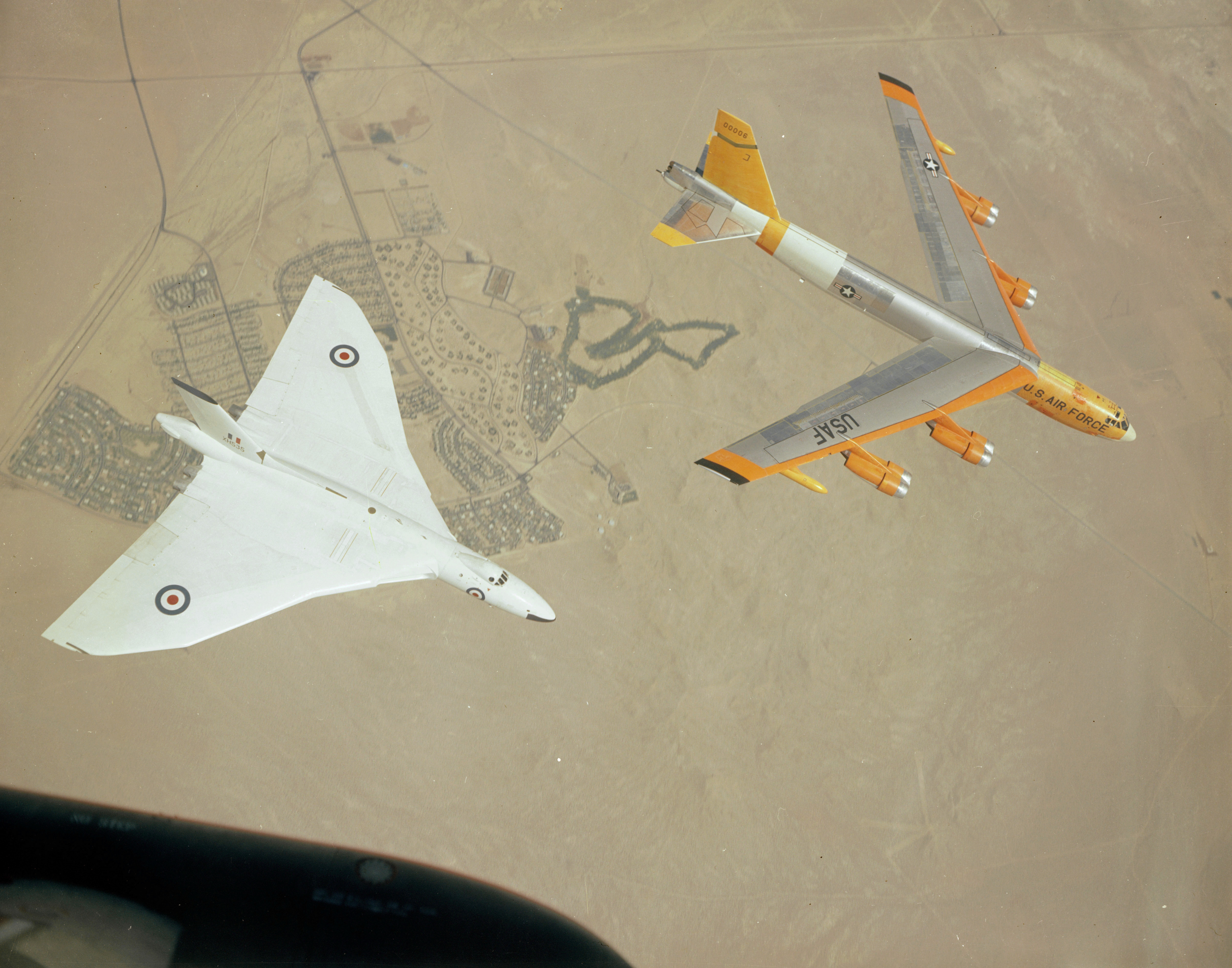
Avro Vulcan and B-52 over Edwards Air Force Base

During development, it was decided that the system could not reach the required accuracy at the desired range without improvements to the guidance system. This led to the introduction of a star tracker platform that would enhance the existing inertial navigation system. For this role, the system had to be capable of tracking bright stars in direct sunlight, a challenging requirement. Star trackers have to be provided with a relatively accurate location in order to point their trackers at selected stars. Over a long flight, the INS would drift too much to provide the needed accuracy. Instead, the tracker has to be able to track the stars during flight, continually updating the INS.

This change meant that the missile could only be carried in locations where the front of the missile could continually observe the sky. This had always been the case on the USAF's B-52 bombers, where they were carried under the narrow-chord wings and the nose projected out in front. But this presented a problem for some of the UK designs, especially the Victor, where the layout of the wing, engines and landing gear left the mounting point behind the massive wing's leading edge. As Valiant had limited range, the decision was made to move forward only with Vulcan, where its mounting points allowed the nose of the missile to project in front of this aircraft's delta wing.

By 1961, several test articles were ready for testing from B-52s, with drop tests starting in January. In January 1961 a Vulcan visited the Douglas plant at Santa Monica, California, to ensure the modifications to the aircraft were electrically compatible with the missile. In Britain, compatibility trials with mockups started on the Vulcan.

Testing started with unpowered drop tests to ensure safe separating from the launch aircraft. Powered tests started in April 1962, but the test series went badly, with the first five trials ending in failure. The first fully successful flight occurred on 19 December 1962.

=== Cancellation ===
By this point, the perceived value of the Skybolt system to Robert McNamara had been seriously eroded. The Polaris had recently gone into service, with overall capabilities similar to Skybolt, but with "loiter" times on the order of months instead of hours. The US Air Force was well into the process of developing the Minuteman missile, whose improved accuracy reduced the need for any bomber attacks. Robert McNamara was particularly opposed to the bomber force and repeatedly stated he felt that the combination of SLBMs and ICBMs would render them useless. He pressed for the cancellation of Skybolt as unnecessary.

The British had canceled all other projects to concentrate fully on Skybolt. When McNamara informed them that they were considering canceling the program in November 1962, a firestorm of protest broke out in the House of Commons. Jo Grimond noted "Does not this mark the absolute failure of the policy of the independent deterrent? Is it not the case that everybody else in the world knew this, except the Conservative Party in this country?" President Kennedy officially cancelled the program on 22 December 1962.

As the political row grew into a major crisis, an emergency meeting between parties from the US and UK was called, leading to the Nassau agreement. Over the next few days a new plan was hammered out that saw the UK purchase the Polaris SLBM, but equipped with British warheads that lacked the dual-key system. The UK would thus retain its independent deterrent force, although its control passed from the RAF largely to the Royal Navy. The Polaris, a much better weapon system for the UK, was a major "scoop" and has been referred to as "almost the bargain of the century". The RAF kept a tactical nuclear capability with the WE.177 which armed V bombers and later the Panavia Tornado force.

A B-52G launched the last XGAM-87A missile at the Atlantic Missile Range a day after the program was canceled. In June 1963, the XGAM-87A was redesignated as XAGM-48A.

== Description ==
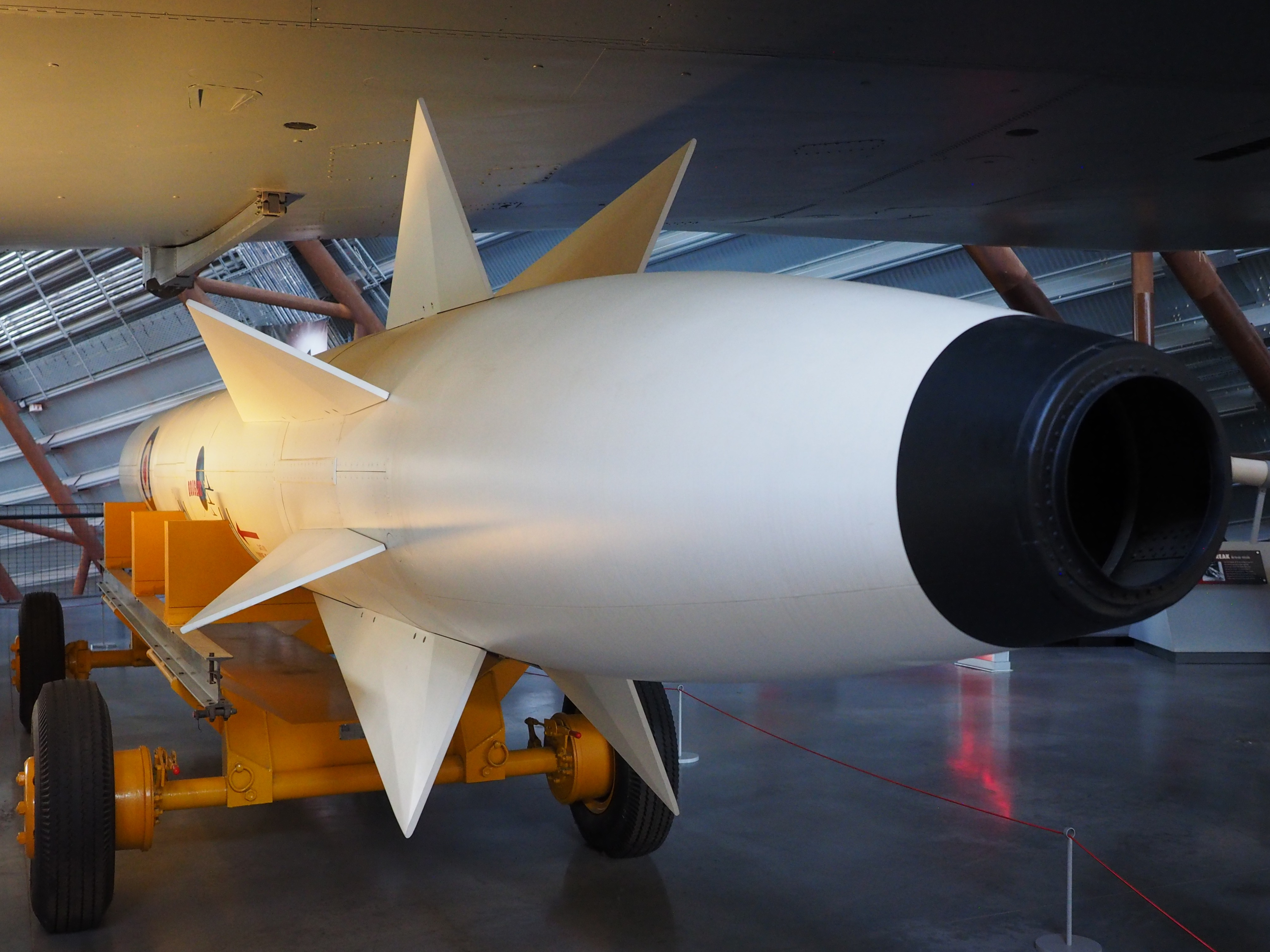
The tail section of the Skybolt at RAF Museum Midland, showing the tail fins

The GAM-87 was powered by a two-stage solid-fuel rocket motor. The missile was fitted with a tailcone to reduce drag while on the pylon, which was ejected shortly after being dropped from the plane. After first stage burnout, the Skybolt coasted for a while before the second stage ignited. First stage control was by eight movable tail fins, while the second stage was equipped with a gimballed nozzle.

Guidance was entirely by inertial platform. The current position was constantly updated from the host aircraft through accurate fixes, meaning that the accuracy of the platform inside the missile was not as critical.

B-52s were to carry four missiles, two under each wing on the weapons pylon with a dual launcher adapter with the missiles slightly staggered (inboard missile slightly ahead of the outboard missile). The Vulcan carried two missiles, one each on smaller underwing pylons.

== Survivors ==
- Royal Air Force Museum Midlands, Shropshire, England
- National Museum of the United States Air Force, Dayton, Ohio, United States
- Air Force Space & Missile Museum, Cape Canaveral Air Force Station, Florida, United States

== See also ==
- List of military aircraft of the United States
- List of missiles by nation
- AGM-28 Hound Dog
- AGM-69 SRAM
