= Kh-15 =

Raduga Kh-15 (NATO reporting name: AS-16 'Kickback')
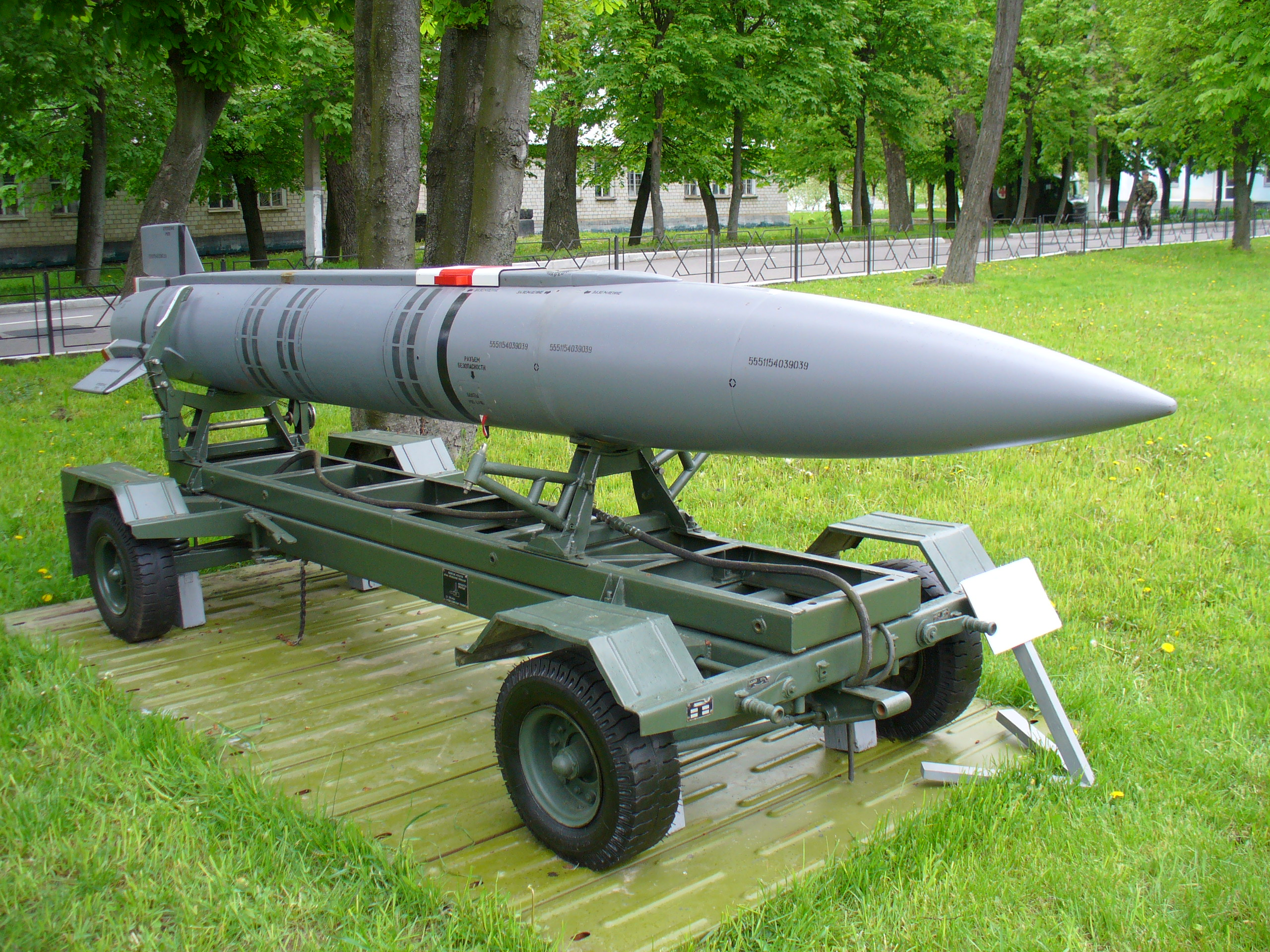
- Raduga Kh-15
- Type: Air-launched ballistic missile Air-to-ground missile Anti-radiation missile (Kh-15P); Anti-ship missile (Kh-15S)
- Place of origin: Soviet Union

Service history
- In service: 1980
- Used by: Russia

Production history
- Designer: Raduga
- Designed: 1974–1980
- Manufacturer: Dubna Machine-building Plant
- Produced: 1980

Specifications
- Mass: 1,200 kg (2,650 lb)
- Length: 478 cm (15 ft 8 in)
- Diameter: 45.5 cm (17.9 in)
- Wingspan: 92 cm (36.2 in) maximum
- Warhead: conventional or nuclear
- Warhead weight: 150 kg (331 lb)
- Blast yield: 300 kt
- Engine: solid-fuel RDTT-160
- Operational range: 300 km (160 nmi)
- Flight ceiling: 40,000 m (130,000 ft)
- Maximum speed: Up to Mach 5
- Guidance system: inertial guidance, active radar homing, or anti-radiation missile
- Launch platform: Tu-22M3,

The Raduga Kh-15 or RKV-15 (Russian: Х-15; NATO: AS-16 "Kickback") is a Soviet hypersonic air-launched ballistic missile carried by the Tupolev Tu-22M and other bombers. Originally developed as a standoff nuclear air-to-ground missile similar to the U.S. Air Force's AGM-69 SRAM, versions with conventional warheads have been developed.

As of early 2019, it was uncertain whether the Kh-15 was in service, with rumors that it had been retired or placed in storage.

== Development ==
In 1967, MKB Raduga started developing the Kh-2000 as a replacement for the Kh-22 (NATO reporting name AS-4 Kitchen) heavy anti-shipping missile. Development of the Kh-15 started some time in the early 1970s. The sophistication of the design made it suitable for other roles, and a nuclear-tipped version was developed in tandem with the conventionally armed variant. An upgrade under development was cancelled in 1991, but reports in 1998 suggested an upgraded Kh-15 might be fitted to Su-35 (Flanker-E) tactical aircraft.

== Design ==
The Kh-15 climbs to an altitude of about 40,000 m (130,000 ft) and then dives in on the target, accelerating to a speed of about Mach 5.

== Operational history ==
It entered service in 1980. It can be carried by the Su-33, Su-34, Tu-95MS-6 'Bear-H', Tu-22M3 'Backfire C', and Tu-160 'Blackjack'.

== Variants ==
- Kh-15 (RKV-15) - the original version with nuclear warhead and inertial guidance
- Kh-15P - passive seeker for anti-radar use
- Kh-15S - active radar seeker for anti-shipping use

== Operators ==
=== Current ===
- Russia

=== Former ===
- Soviet Union - Passed onto successor states

== Similar weapons ==
- KSR-5 (AS-6 'Kingfish') - heavy anti-surface missile carried under the wings of Tu-22M
- Kh-59 (AS-13 'Kingbolt') - ASM for tactical aircraft, up to 285 km range
- Kh-37 (updated version of AS-20 'Kayak') - land attack version of subsonic Kh-35 Anti-Ship missile, 250 km range
- AGM-69 SRAM - 1000 kg US missile with up to 170 km range

== Photo Gallery ==
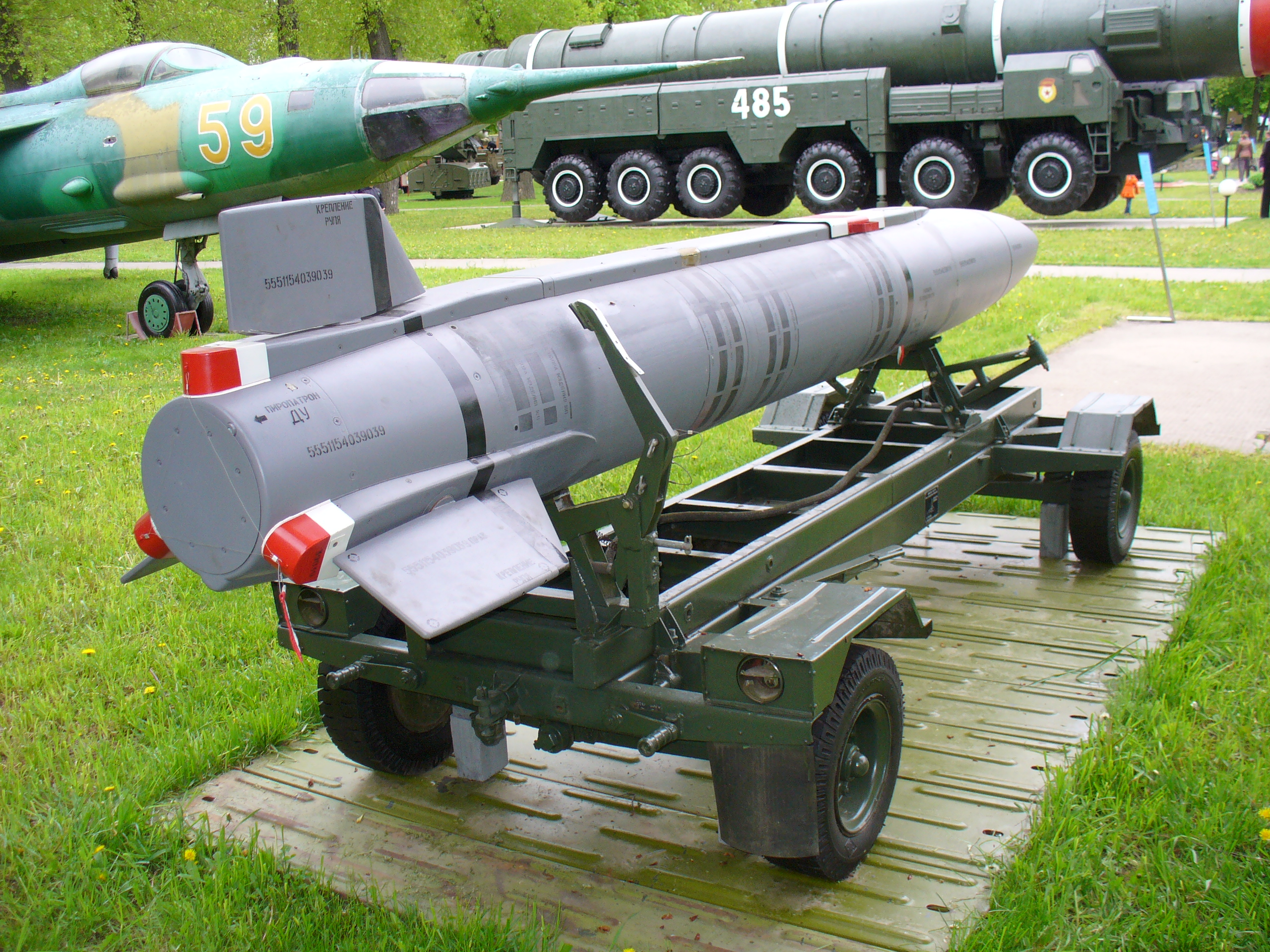
Kh-15 from rear

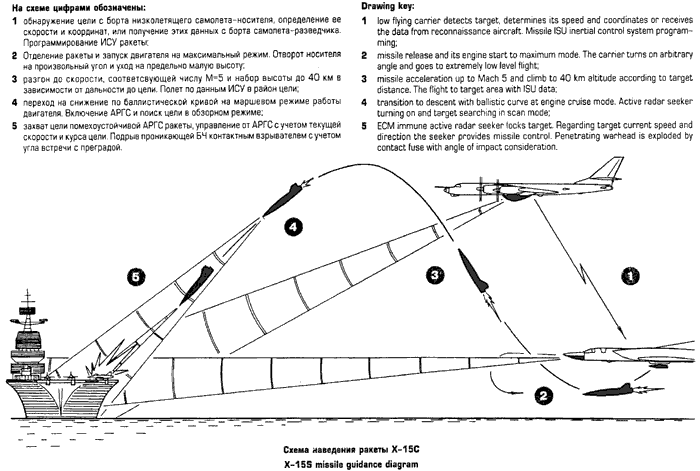
Mission profile (anti-ship version)
