= Probability of kill =

Video game terminology

In simulations, the probability of kill is the statistical likelihood of an engagement between a weapon and a target result in a satisfactory outcome (i.e. "kill"). Performance auditing and statistical decisions are required when all of the variables that must be considered are not incorporated into the current model, similar to the actuarial methods used by insurance companies to deal with large numbers of customers and huge numbers of variables. Military planners rely on such calculations to determine the quantity of weapons necessary to destroy an enemy force, and the concept is also used in computer games, models, and operations research programs.

The probability of kill, or "P_{k}", is usually based on a uniform random number generator. This algorithm creates a number between 0 and 1 that is approximately uniformly distributed in that space. If the P_{k} of a weapon/target engagement is 30% (or 0.30), then every random number generated that is less than 0.3 is considered a "kill"; every number greater than 0.3 is considered a "no kill". When used many times in a simulation, the average result will be that 30% of the weapon/target engagements will be a kill and 70% will not be a kill.

This measure may also be used to express the accuracy of a weapon system, known as the probability of hit or "P_{hit}". For example, if a weapon is expected to hit a target nine times out of ten with a representative set of ten engagements, one could say that this weapon has a P_{hit} of 0.9. If the chance of hits is nine out of ten, but the probability of a kill with a hit is 0.5, then the P_{k} becomes 0.45 or 45%. This reflects the fact that even modern guided warheads may not always destroy a hit target such as an aircraft, missile or main battle tank.

Additional factors include the probability of detection (P_{d}), reliability of the targeting system (R_{sys}), and reliability of the weapon (R_{w}), to name a few. For example, if a missile operates properly e.g. 90% of the time (assuming a good shot), the targeting system operates properly 85% of the time, and enemy targets are detected at 50%, accuracy of the P_{k} estimation can be increased:

P_{k} = P_{hit} * P_{d} * R_{sys} * R_{w}

For example:

P_{k} = 0.9 * 0.5 * 0.85 * 0.90 = 0.344

Users can also specify a probability according to a class of targets, for example, it has been stated that the SA-10 surface-to-air missile system has a P_{k} of 0.9 against highly maneuvering targets, whereas its P_{k} against non-maneuvering targets is much higher.

== See also ==
- Dense inert metal explosive
