= Bold Orion =

1950s American air-launched ballistic missile prototype

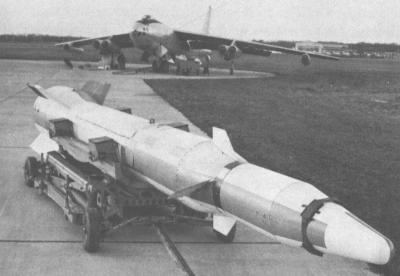
- Bold Orion, with B-47 launch aircraft
- Type: Air-launched ballistic missile
- Place of origin: United States

Service history
- In service: 1958–1959
- Used by: United States Air Force

Production history
- Designed: 1958
- Manufacturer: Martin Aircraft
- No. built: 12

Specifications (Two-stage version)
- Length: 37 feet (11 m)
- Diameter: 31 inches (0.79 m)
- Engine: First stage, Thiokol TX-20 Sergeant; 1,500 lb_{f} (6.66 kN); Second stage, ABL X-248 Altair; 2,800 lb_{f} (12.45 kN)
- Propellant: Solid fuel
- Operational range: 1,100 miles (1,800 km)
- Launch platform: B-47 Stratojet

The Bold Orion missile, also known as Weapons System 199B (WS-199B), was a prototype air-launched ballistic missile (ALBM) developed by Martin Aircraft during the 1950s. Developed in both one- and two-stage designs, the missile was moderately successful in testing, and helped pave the way for development of the GAM-87 Skybolt ALBM. In addition, the Bold Orion was used in early anti-satellite weapons testing, performing the first interception of a satellite by a missile.

== Design and development ==
The Bold Orion missile was developed as part of Weapons System 199, initiated by the United States Air Force (USAF) in response to the U.S. Navy's Polaris program, with funding authorised by the United States Congress in 1957. The purpose of WS-199 was the development of technology that would be used in new strategic weapons for the USAF's Strategic Air Command, not to deliver operational weapons; a primary emphasis was on proving the feasibility of an air-launched ballistic missile.

The designation WS-199B was assigned to the project that, under a contract awarded in 1958 to Martin Aircraft, would become the Bold Orion missile. The design of Bold Orion was simple, using parts developed for other missile systems to reduce the cost and development time of the project. The initial Bold Orion configuration was a single-stage vehicle, using a Thiokol TX-20 Sergeant solid-fuel rocket. Following initial testing, the Bold Orion configuration was altered to become a two-stage vehicle, an Allegany Ballistics Laboratory Altair upper stage being added to the missile.

== Operational history ==
Having been given top priority by the Air Force, the first flight test of the Bold Orion missile was conducted on May 26, 1958, from a Boeing B-47 Stratojet carrier aircraft, which launched the Bold Orion vehicle at the apex of a high-speed, high-angle climb. The zoom climb tactic, combined with the thrust from the rocket motor of the missile itself, allowed the missile to achieve its maximum range, or, alternatively, to reach space.

A twelve-flight test series of the Bold Orion vehicle was conducted;. Despite suffering only one outright failure, the initial flight tests of the single-stage rocket proved less successful than hoped. Authorisation was received to modify the Bold Orion to become a two-stage vehicle. In addition to the modifications improving the missile's reliability, they increased the range of Bold Orion to over 1,000 miles (1,600 km). Four of the final six test firings were of the two-stage vehicle. These were considered successful, and established that the ALBM was a viable weapon.

=== ASAT test ===
The final test launch of Bold Orion, conducted on October 13, 1959, was a test of the vehicle's capabilities in the anti-satellite role. Piloted by Carl E Brust Jr, the missile was launched from an altitude of 35,000 feet (11,000 m) from its B-47 mothership, the missile successfully intercepted the Explorer 6 satellite, passing its target at a range of less than 4 miles (6.4 km) at an altitude of 156 miles (251 km). If the missile had a nuclear warhead, the satellite would have been destroyed.

The Bold Orion ASAT test was the first interception of a satellite by any method, proving that anti-satellite missiles were feasible. This test, along with an earlier, unsuccessful test of the High Virgo missile in the anti-satellite role, had political repercussions. The Eisenhower administration sought to establish space as a neutral ground for everyone's use, and the "indication of hostile intent" given by the tests was frowned upon, with anti-satellite weapons development being soon curtailed.

=== Legacy ===
The results of the Bold Orion project, along with those from the testing of the High Virgo missile, also developed under WS-199, provided data and knowledge that assisted the Air Force in forming the requirements for the follow-on WS-138A, which would produce the GAM-87 Skybolt missile.

== Launch history ==
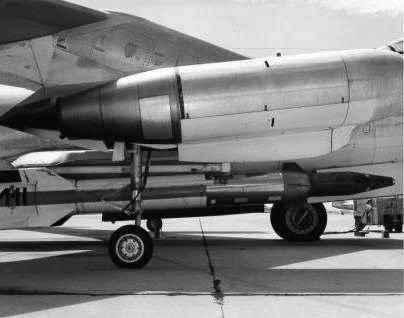
Bold Orion on B-47 carrier aircraft

Date/Time (GMT)	Rocket	Launch site	Outcome	Remarks
1958-05-26	Single-stage	Cape Canaveral	Success	Apogee 8 km (5.0 mi)
1958-06-27	Single-stage	Cape Canaveral	Failure	Apogee 12 km (7.5 mi)
1958-07-18	Single-stage	Cape Canaveral	Success	Apogee 100 km (62 mi)
1958-09-25	Single-stage	Cape Canaveral	Success	Apogee 100 km (62 mi)
1958-10-10	Single-stage	Cape Canaveral	Success	Apogee 100 km (62 mi)
1958-11-17	Single-stage	Cape Canaveral	Success	Apogee 100 km (62 mi)
1958-12-08	Two-stage	Cape Canaveral	Success	Apogee 200 km (120 mi)
1958-12-16	Two-stage	Cape Canaveral	Success	Apogee 200 km (120 mi)
1959-04-04	Two-stage	AMR DZ	Success	Apogee 200 km (120 mi)
1959-06-08	Single-stage	AMR DZ	Success	Apogee 100 km (62 mi)
1959-06-19	Single-stage	Cape Canaveral	Success	Apogee 100 km (62 mi)
1959-10-13	Two-stage	AMR DZ	Success	Apogee 200 km (120 mi)

AMR DZ means Atlantic Missile Range Drop Zone.

== See also ==
- Terra-3

Related development

- Alpha Draco
- High Virgo

Comparable weapons

- ASM-135 ASAT
- GAM-87 Skybolt
- NOTS-EV-2 Caleb
