= WS-199 =

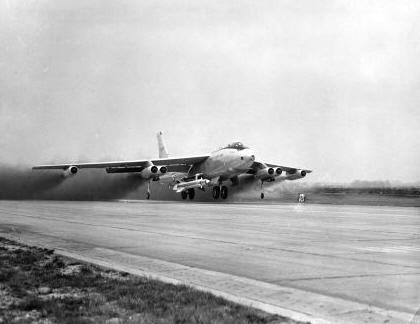
- A B-47 takes off carrying a Bold Orion ALBM, developed under WS-199
- Type: Experimental missile program
- Place of origin: United States

Service history
- In service: 1957-1959
- Used by: Strategic Air Command

Production history
- Variants: Bold Orion, High Virgo, Alpha Draco

Weapons System 199 (WS-199) was a weapons development program conducted by the United States Air Force to research and develop new strategic weapons systems for Strategic Air Command. Two air-launched and one ground-launched vehicles were developed as part of the program. While none entered production, they assisted in the development of both the GAM-87 Skybolt air-launched ballistic missile and that of re-entry vehicles for ballistic missiles.

== Background ==
The US Navy began their Polaris missile project in December 1956, and this program presented serious problems for the Air Force's own missile developments. The Air Force intercontinental ballistic missiles (ICBMs) were liquid fueled and required considerable time to fuel and spin up their inertial platforms before launch, during which time they were open to air attack. This meant that a Soviet sneak attack by bombers on the ICBM bases, combined with using their own ICBMs against Strategic Air Command's bomber bases, could significantly damage the Air Force's strike capabilities.

In comparison, Polaris could be launched from practically anywhere in huge areas of the Atlantic and Pacific and was essentially immune to attack. The Navy developed a policy known as "survivable deterrent force" of about 600 megatons, which they felt would deter any Soviet attack under any circumstances. As they laid plans to build the Polaris submarine fleet needed to carry these missiles, the Air Force was left in the position of potentially being cut out of the deterrence role. This was most forcibly pointed out in an internally circulated document entitled "The Problem of Polaris".

The Air Force response was two-fold. One was WS-199, which explored various options to make the Air Force's own missiles as immune as the Navy's. The primary method was the air-launched missile, which would be kept on station close to the Soviet Union but outside their defensive range, able to be launched at a moment's notice. They also explored ways to extend the range of ground-launched missiles, so that small mobile missiles might be able to carry out attacks from the United States without being subject to counterattack. Other options, not part of WS-199, included an active defense using the LIM-49 Nike Zeus and its follow-ons, and rail-based launchers.

== WS-199A ==
The designation WS-199A was applied to Strategic Air Command's overall studies of future requirements, that were tested using the hardware developed under the other WS-199 subprojects. Receiving Congressional approval in 1957, the WS-199 project would award contracts to three different companies to develop experimental designs for new, hypersonic weapons. Although none of the weapons were planned to be operational, in an emergency they could be quickly developed for combat service.

== WS-199B Bold Orion ==
Developed by Martin Aircraft, the Bold Orion missile was an air-launched ballistic missile, launched from the B-47 Stratojet medium bomber, with flight tests being carried out in 1958 and 1959. Early launches of the Bold Orion as a single-stage vehicle were unsuccessful, however a redesign as a two-stage weapon produced improved results, with the remainder of the 12-launch series establishing the ALBM as a viable vehicle. The final test flight trialed the Bold Orion missile as an anti-satellite missile, passing within 4 miles (6.4 km) of Explorer VI, the first-ever interception of a satellite.

== WS-199C High Virgo ==
Developed by Lockheed Aircraft, the High Virgo missile was developed as a single-stage air-launched ballistic missile, launched from the B-58 Hustler supersonic bomber. Four test flights were conducted during 1958 and 1959, of which two were successful; the final launch of the program tested the missile in the anti-satellite role, but suffered telemetry failure. The results of the Bold Orion and High Virgo tests assisted in the development of the WS-138 specification, which became the GAM-87 Skybolt ALBM.

== WS-199D Alpha Draco ==
Developed by McDonnell Aircraft, the Alpha Draco missile was an experimental, ground-launched, two-stage missile that conducted research on re-entry vehicles and the boost-glide principle of reentry. Three launches of the vehicle were conducted during 1959, of which two were successful.
