= Alpha Draco =

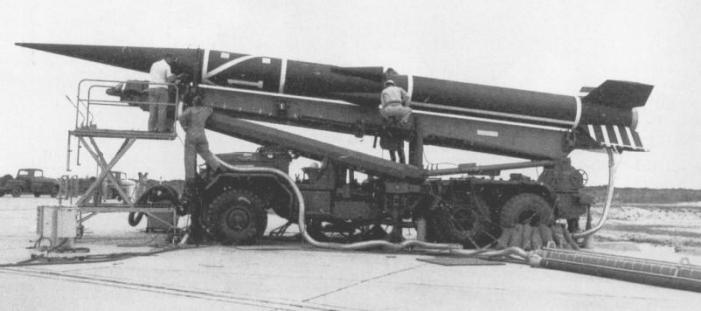
- The Alpha Draco test vehicle
- Type: Experimental ballistic missile
- Place of origin: United States

Service history
- In service: 1959
- Used by: United States Air Force

Production history
- Designed: 1957-1958
- Manufacturer: McDonnell
- No. built: 3

Specifications
- Length: 46.1 feet (14.05 m)
- Diameter: 31 inches (790 mm)
- Wingspan: 7.1 feet (2.16 m)
- Engine: First stage, Thiokol TX-20; 50,000 lb_{f} (222 kN); Second stage, Thiokol TX-30; 12,300 lb_{f} (54.8 kN)
- Propellant: Solid fuel
- Operational range: 240 miles (390 km)
- Flight ceiling: 100,000 feet (30,000 m)
- Maximum speed: Mach 5+

The Alpha Draco missile, also known as Weapons System 199D (WS-199D), was an experimental ballistic missile developed by McDonnell Aircraft in the late 1950s to investigate the aerodynamic physics of the boost-glide reentry trajectory. Three test flights were conducted in 1959, of which two were successful.

== Design and development ==
As part of the WS-199 project to develop new strategic weapons for the United States Air Force's Strategic Air Command, McDonnell Aircraft developed the Alpha Draco missile between 1957 and 1959, under a contract to launch three vehicles to determine the feasibility of the boost-glide reentry vehicle (BGRV) concept. The purpose of the rocket was to establish whether a strategic missile using the "boost-glide" principle of propulsion could be practically used. The idea had been proposed by Walter Dornberger, who had moved to McDonnell after working for a short time at Bell Aircraft. Dornberger had originally worked on the idea as part of efforts to extend the range of the V-2 missile late in World War II.

The Alpha Draco missile was a two-stage vehicle, the first stage comprising a Thiokol TX-20 solid-fuel rocket of the type used in the MGM-29 Sergeant theater ballistic missile, and the second stage using a Thiokol TX-30 solid-fuel rocket. The payload vehicle was aerodynamically shaped, using the lifting body principle to provide aerodynamic lift; following burnout of the first stage, the vehicle would coast for a short time before ignition of the second stage, burnout of the second stage was followed by the vehicle entering the glide phase of flight, which would be terminated by a dive upon the target. The vehicle would enter a roll during its glide period to distribute aerodynamic heating. Guidance was provided by a Honeywell inertial guidance unit.

== Operational history ==
Following modification of the launch pad at the Cape Canaveral Air Force Station's Launch Complex 10 to include a concrete flame deflector and a gantry modified from that used by the Honest John battlefield missile, three test launches of the Alpha Draco vehicle were conducted during 1959. The initial flight, on February 16, was successful; the second flight, one month later, also fulfilled its test goals. The final launch of the Alpha Draco on April 30, however, suffered a flight-control failure and was destroyed by range safety command. With the expenditure of the third and final vehicle, the program was concluded, the project's cost having come to a total of approximately $5 million USD ($56 million today).

The program demonstrated that the vehicle was able to generate lift/drag ratio of 3.5 to 1, allowing it to greatly extend its range; it was also the first missile to achieve hypersonic flight inside of an atmosphere. Although this was not put to immediate use, the tests provided valuable data that was used for later programs like the Boost Glide Reentry Vehicle and the ASSET and X-23 PRIME programs. Better understanding of the hypersonic lift process also led to the lifting body designs of the 1960s. McDonnell Aircraft proposed a development of the Alpha Draco concept for the USAF requirement that evolved into the Minuteman missile program, but the boost-glide concept was considered too immature for operational development.

To be on the safe side, Minuteman silos were built deeper than required in case a boost-glide weapon would be fitted in the future. Although this never came to be, the extra depth proved invaluable as it allowed the missile to grow in length to the Minuteman III design without having to build new silos.

== Launch history ==
Date/Time (GMT)	Launch site	Outcome	Remarks
1959-02-16	Launch Complex 10	Success	Apogee 30 kilometres (19 mi), impact 224 nautical miles (415 km; 258 mi) downrange
1959-03-16	Launch Complex 10	Success	Apogee 30 kilometres (19 mi), impact 212 nautical miles (393 km; 244 mi) downrange
1959-04-27	Launch Complex 10	Failure	Destroyed due to flight path excursion following second stage ignition.

== See also ==
- Boeing X-20 Dyna-Soar

Related development

- Bold Orion
- High Virgo

Comparable weapons

- Avangard
- DF-ZF
- HTV-2
- 14-X
