= High Virgo =

- High Virgo missile on B-58 launch aircraft
- Type: Air-launched ballistic missile
- Place of origin: United States

Service history
- In service: 1958–1959
- Used by: United States Air Force

Production history
- Designed: 1958
- Manufacturer: Lockheed Corporation
- No. built: 4

Specifications (WS-199C)
- Mass: 12,000 pounds (5,400 kg)
- Length: 30 feet 4 inches (9.25 m)
- Diameter: 31 inches (790 mm)
- Engine: Thiokol TX-20; 50,000 lb_{f} (222 kN)
- Propellant: Solid fuel
- Operational range: 185 miles (298 km)
- Flight ceiling: 250,000 feet (76,000 m)+
- Boost time: 29 seconds
- Maximum speed: Mach 6
- Guidance system: Inertial guidance
- Launch platform: Convair B-58 Hustler

The High Virgo, also known as Weapons System 199C (WS-199C), was a prototype air-launched ballistic missile (ALBM) jointly developed by Lockheed and the Convair division of General Dynamics during the late 1950s. The missile proved moderately successful and aided in the development of the later GAM-87 Skybolt ALBM. It was also used in early tests of anti-satellite weapons.

== Design and development ==
As part of the WS-199 project to develop new strategic weapons for the United States Air Force's Strategic Air Command, the Lockheed Corporation and the Convair division of General Dynamics proposed the development of an air-launched ballistic missile, to be carried by the Convair B-58 Hustler supersonic medium bomber. In early 1958 the two companies were awarded a contract for development of the weapon, designated WS-199C and given the code-name "High Virgo". While the project was intended to be strictly a research-and-development exercise, it was planned that the weapon would be quickly capable of being developed into an operational system if required.

The High Virgo missile was a single-stage weapon, powered by a solid-fueled Thiokol TX-20 rocket, and was equipped with an advanced inertial guidance system derived from that of the AGM-28 Hound Dog cruise missile. Four tailfins in a cruciform arrangement provided directional control. The missile was developed by Lockheed, utilising components developed for several existing missiles to reduce the cost of the project, and also to reduce the development time required. Convair was responsible for development of a pylon for carriage and launching of the missile from the prototype B-58, the pylon replacing the aircraft's normal weapons pod.

== Operational history ==
Four test flights of the High Virgo missile were conducted. Due to development problems, the first two did not include the inertial guidance system, instead they were fitted with a simple autopilot guiding the weapon on a pre-programmed course. Launched from its B-58 carrier aircraft at high altitude and supersonic speed, the initial flight, conducted on September 5, 1958, was a failure when the missile's controls malfunctioned. The second test, three months later, proved more successful, with the missile flying over a range of nearly 200 miles (320 km). The third flight test, the following June, utilized the inertial guidance system for the first time. It was a successful flight.

=== Anti-satellite test ===
The fourth High Virgo missile was utilized in a test mission intended to demonstrate the capability of the missile for use as a "satellite interceptor", or anti-satellite missile (ASAT). The missile, modified with cameras to record the results of the test, was initially targeted at the Explorer 4 satellite. Due to errors in calculating the satellite's orbit Explorer 5 was targeted instead.

The ASAT test mission, the final flight of the High Virgo missile, was conducted on September 22, 1959. Less than a minute after the launch of the missile from its B-58 carrier aircraft at Mach 2, the telemetry signal was lost. No data was recovered from the test, and the camera data, intended to be recovered afterward, was not located. Hence the test was inconclusive.

No further test firings of High Virgo were conducted, the research project having been concluded. The Air Force had begun work on what would become the GAM-87 Skybolt missile, which incorporated lessons learned from the WS-199 project.

== Launch history ==
Date/Time (GMT)	Launch site	Outcome	Remarks
1958-09-05	AMR DZ	Failure	Apogee 13 km (8.1 mi)
1958-12-19	AMR DZ	Success	Apogee 76 km (47 mi)
1959-06-04	AMR DZ	Success	Apogee 51 km (32 mi)
1959-09-22	AMR DZ	Inconclusive	Apogee 12 km (7.5 mi) (Note: Altitude at which telemetry was lost.)

AMR DZ means Atlantic Missile Range Drop Zone.

== See also ==
- Terra-3

Related development

- Alpha Draco
- Bold Orion

Comparable weapons

- ASM-135 ASAT
- GAM-87 Skybolt
- NOTS-EV-2 Caleb
