= British Rail Class 50 =

Class of diesel electric locomotives

English Electric Type 4 British Rail Class 50
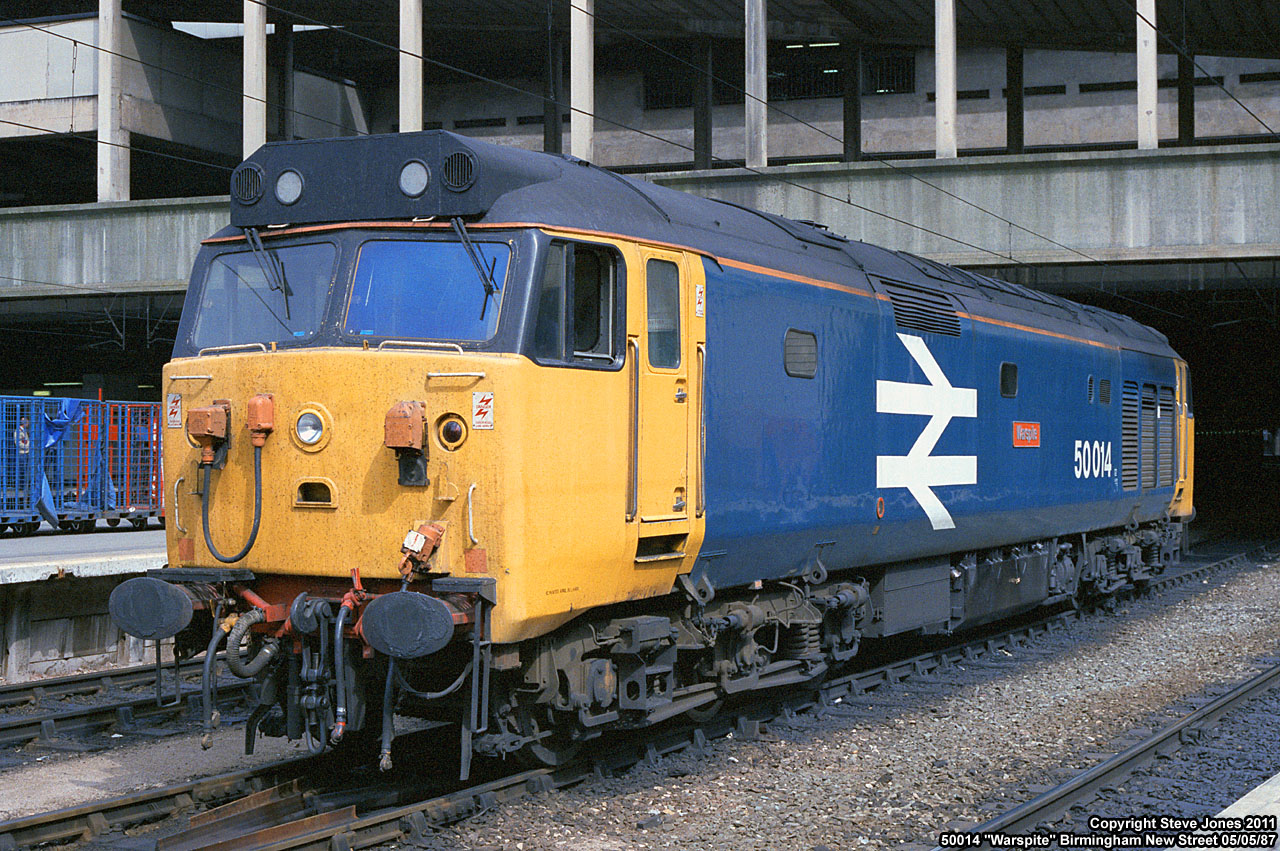
- A Class 50 at Birmingham New Street in 1987
Type and origin
- Power type: Diesel-electric
- Builder: English Electric at Vulcan Foundry
- Build date: 1967–1968
- Total produced: 50
Specifications
- Configuration
  - UIC: Co′Co′
  - Commonwealth: Co-Co
- Gauge: 4 ft 8 1/2 in (1,435 mm) standard gauge
- Wheel diameter: 3 ft 7 in (1.092 m)
- Wheelbase: 56 ft 2 in (17.12 m)
- Length: 68 ft 6 in (20.88 m)
- Width: 8 ft 10 in (2.69 m)
- Height: 12 ft 9 in (3.89 m)
- Axle load: 19 long tons 10 hundredweight (19.8 t; 21.8 short tons)
- Loco weight: 115 long tons (117 t; 129 short tons)
- Fuel capacity: 1,540 imp gal (7,000 L; 1,850 US gal)
- Prime mover: English Electric 16 CSVT
- Engine type: 246 litres (15,000 cu in) Diesel engine
- Traction motors: 6 English Electric type 538/5A axle-hung nose-suspended 400 hp (300 kW) traction motors
- Cylinders: 16
- MU working: ■ Orange Square
- Train heating: Electric Train Heat
- Train brakes: Dual (Air and Vacuum)
Performance figures
- Maximum speed: 100 mph (161 km/h)
- Power output: Engine: 2,700 bhp (2,010 kW)
- Tractive effort: Maximum: 48,500 lbf (216 kN); Continuous: 33,000 lbf (147,000 N)@ 23.5 mph (37.8 km/h)
Career
- Operators: British Rail
- Numbers: D400–D449; later 50001–50050
- Nicknames: Hoovers
- Axle load class: Route availability 6
- Withdrawn: 1987–1994
- Disposition: 18 preserved, remainder scrapped

The British Rail Class 50 is a class of diesel locomotives designed to haul express passenger trains at 100 mph (160 km/h). Built by English Electric at the Vulcan Foundry in Newton-le-Willows between 1967 and 1968, the Class 50s were initially on a 10-year lease from English Electric Leasing, and were employed hauling express passenger trains on the then non-electrified section of the West Coast Main Line between Crewe and Scotland. Initially numbered D400–D449 and known as English Electric Type 4s, the locomotives were purchased outright by British Rail (BR) at the end of the lease and became Class 50 in the TOPS renumbering of 1973.

The class gained the nickname "Hoovers" because of the noise made by the clean air plant at the No. 2 end, prior to refurbishment, which was likened to that of a vacuum cleaner, a name believed given to them by the staff at Paddington Station. Once the electrification from Crewe to Glasgow was completed the locomotives were moved to the Great Western Main Line (GWML) out of Paddington to allow the retirement of most of the remaining diesel-hydraulic locomotives then in use. As trains on the GWML steadily moved to High Speed Train operation from 1976, the Class 50s moved to hauling trains between London Waterloo and Exeter St Davids, and also trains from London Paddington to Hereford and Worcester via Oxford until the majority of those trains too were taken over by IC125 operation. The class was steadily retired from service in the late 1980s and early 1990s as their services moved to operation by second-generation Class 159 DMUs.

== Description ==
=== Development ===
The origins of the Class 50 lie in an invitation from the British Transport Commission (BTC) to manufacturers to produce a design for a lightweight Type 4 diesel locomotive with a gross power output of at least 2,500 hp. In order to produce a prototype quickly, English Electric based their design on that for their Deltic locomotives which were then in production. Unlike the Deltics, this design was powered by a single engine, the 16CSVT, a development of the 16SVT used in the Class 40 locomotives. Parts related to the contemporary Class 37s were also used. The result was DP2, a 2,700 hp Diesel-electric locomotive weighing 105 tons and with a top speed of 100 mph.

However, before the prototype could be completed, English Electric's design was rejected by the BTC, primarily on the grounds that the 16CSVT was unproven, and doubted its ability to produce the required power levels. Even after the delivery of DP2 in May 1962, any hope of future orders seemed over with the BTC's decision to standardise its Type 4 fleet on the Brush-Sulzer Class 47 design.

The DP2 design earned a reprieve in 1965, when the National Traction Plan of that year identified a need for an additional 50 Type 4 locomotives. The British Railways Board (successor to the BTC) were forced to consider an alternative to ordering more Class 47s, which were starting to suffer serious problems with engine stress cracking, a problem which necessitated the derating of the fleet to 2,580 hp. At the same time, DP2 and its 16CSVT engine had proved far more reliable than expected. Negotiations took place with English Electric for a production batch of 50 locomotives for use on the Eastern Region. English Electric intended to build the new batch as similar to DP2 as possible but the BRB had produced a standard locomotive cab with a flat front and headcode box and also had specific requirements relating to the engine room and other equipment. English Electric produced several alternative front-end designs including one with a wrap-around windscreen but the standard front-end design was eventually adopted for the class.

=== Production ===
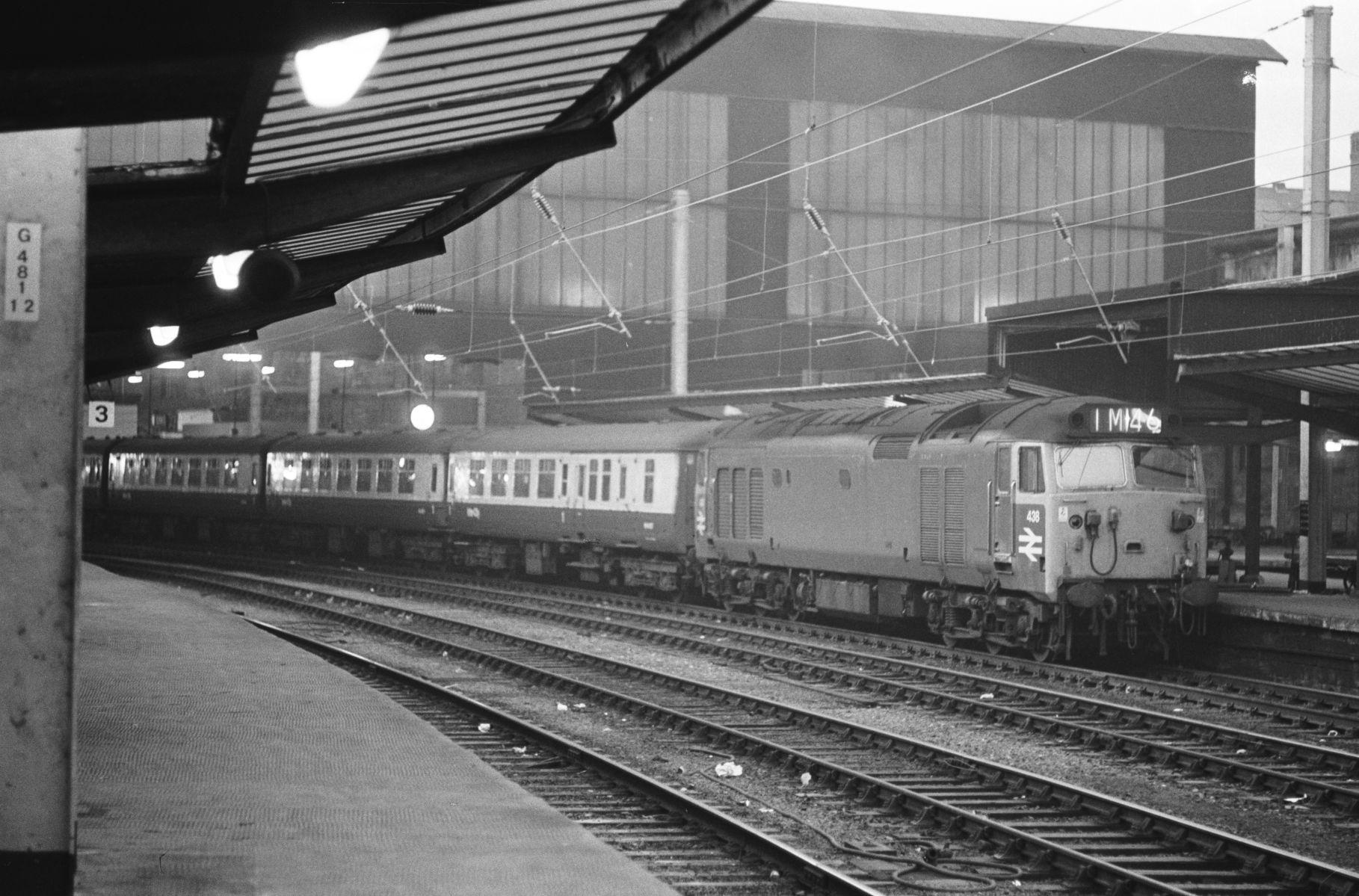
D438 (later 50038) at Carlisle Citadel station in 1973

The complete production run of 50 locomotives was built in just over a year and numbered from D400 to D449. D400 entered service in October 1967 and deliveries were completed with D449 in November 1968. Unusually, the ownership of the locomotives remained with the manufacturer and they were operated by British Rail on a 10-year lease which included certain stipulations relating to availability. The D prefix was quickly dropped for all diesel engines after steam was banned from British Rail's mainline in 1968. The Class 50 engines were numbered as 400 to 449 from 1969 to 1974.

== Service ==
Distribution of locomotives, March 1974
British Rail Class 50 is located in England
Code	Name	Quantity
BR	Bristol Bath Road	8
CD	Crewe Diesel	42
Total:		50

The class was built for working passenger services on the West Coast Main Line (WCML) north of Crewe, to Preston, Lancaster, Carlisle, Glasgow Central and Perth, occasionally reaching as far north as Aberdeen. Services south of Crewe would generally be worked by an electric locomotive, with the Class 50s taking over for the journeys that continued north. Initially trains were hauled by a single locomotive, but from May 1970 they were paired on 8 out of 34 locomotive diagrams covering Anglo-Scottish services north of Crewe, allowing greatly accelerated timings to be applied (including a six-hour schedule for the "Royal Scot" London Euston-Glasgow Central and v.v. service). Once the electric service was introduced as far as Preston in 1973, this double-heading by Class 50s transferred there, although poor availability often resulted in single-heading with consequent delays. The ability to operate using multiple working had been part of the locomotive's initial design brief, but only two of the class had the facility from new, but with the introduction of the regular double headed duties, this facility was fitted to the whole class.

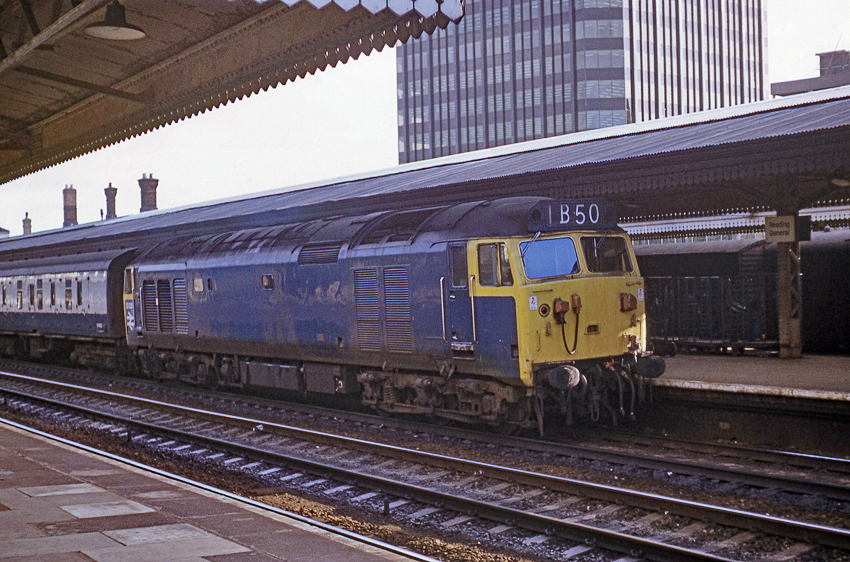
50010 at Reading General in 1974

By 1974 the northern WCML was electrified, and the Class 50 fleet was displaced by new Class 87 electrics. The fleet was transferred to the Western Region between 1972 and 1976, working mainline passenger services from London Paddington along the Great Western Main Line (GWML) to destinations such as Oxford, Bristol Temple Meads, Plymouth and Penzance. It was not unusual for locomotives to work services on other routes, such as the Birmingham New Street to Bristol Temple Meads corridor. The introduction of the Class 50s on these routes enabled the last remaining, non-standard, diesel hydraulic "Westerns" to be withdrawn.

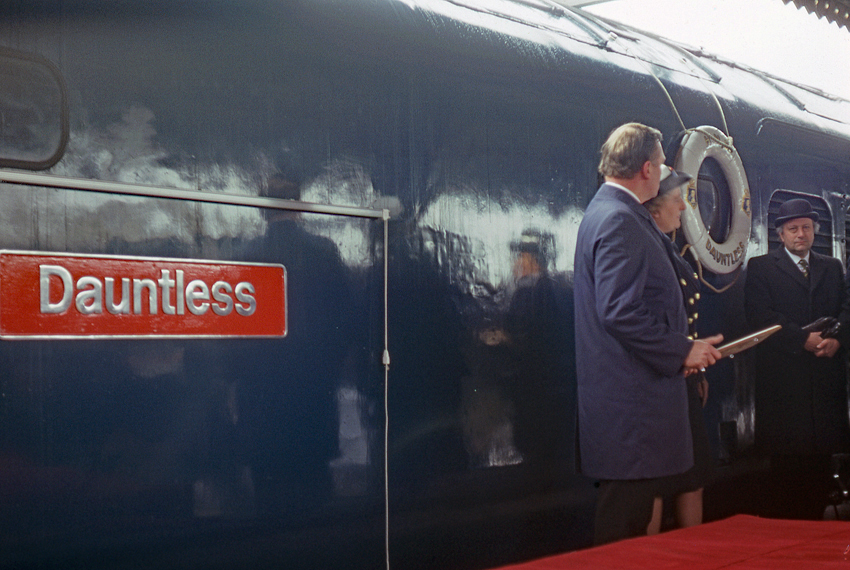
50048 Dauntless naming ceremony at Reading, 1978

In the late-1970s, following a period where the policy of locomotive naming had been abandoned, BR was persuaded to name the class 50s after Royal Navy ships with notable records in World War I and II. As a result, the first locomotive naming occurred in January 1978, when 50035 was named Ark Royal by the captain and crew of then current aircraft carrier HMS Ark Royal. The rest of the fleet was named during the course of the next few years.

From 1977, British Rail introduced InterCity 125s onto the Great Western Main Line which began the displacement of the Class 50 fleet onto other routes, such as services to Birmingham New Street from London Paddington and Bristol Temple Meads. The class also found work on the West of England Main Line from London Waterloo to Salisbury, Exeter and Plymouth. However, due in part to the over-complexity of the design, the class was plagued with reliability problems which resulted in frequent service failures and cancellations. As a result, the decision was taken in the late 1970s to refurbish the entire fleet.

== Refurbishment ==
To deal with increasing reliability problems, the Class 50 fleet was refurbished at Doncaster Works between 1979 and 1983. Doncaster had taken responsibility for the fleet after BR completed the purchase of the locomotives from English Electric. The work involved simplifying the complex electronics and removing redundant features such as slow speed control and rheostatic braking. In addition, the air intake fan arrangement was modified, because the original setup often prevented fresh air from entering the engine room and stale, oil mist-filled air from escaping, leading to many main generator failures. This was in part due to the moisture in the air in the UK: dust and other particles would lodge in the filter system and become 'gummed up' with moisture, preventing circulation which in turn also hampered the intended engine compartment pressure levels which then meant 'filtered' air could not be evacuated by the intended means. The filtration system was fundamentally sound and widely used in other countries; the problems arose because relative humidity had not been taken into account at the design stage. This modification eliminated the characteristic droning "sucking" noise which had earned the "Hoover" nickname.

Externally, the locomotives all received high-intensity headlights, which changed the appearance of the front end. Starting with 50006, the first six refurbished locomotives were outshopped in the standard BR Blue livery. However, 50006 Neptune and 50017 Royal Oak initially ran with blanking plates covering the headlight apertures, prior to headlights becoming available. In August 1980, 50023 Howe became the first to be outshopped in a revised livery with wrap around yellow cabs, black cab window surrounds, grey roof, large bodyside numerals and BR logo, in a livery that became known as BR Large Logo Blue. The final loco to be refurbished was 50014 Warspite, which was released back into traffic in December 1983. The last member of the class to be painted from original plain blue into the Large Logo blue livery was 50013 Agincourt, following release from an intermediate overhaul at Doncaster in September 1984.

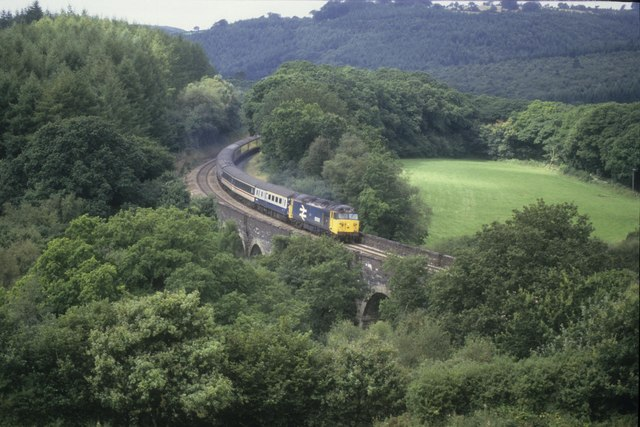
50043 Eagle hauling the morning express across the Penadlake viaduct in 1987

Following refurbishment, the fleet was concentrated at two depots; Laira in Plymouth, and Old Oak Common in west London. The class were again used for Western Region services on the GWML out of Paddington, and on the West of England Main Line from Waterloo to Salisbury and Exeter.

In 1984, 50007 Hercules was repainted into lined Brunswick green livery and renamed Sir Edward Elgar, to commemorate the 150th anniversary of the Great Western Railway (GWR). Four Class 47 locomotives were similarly treated, and a Class 117 diesel multiple unit (DMU) was repainted in chocolate and cream livery. As a result, 50007 quickly became a favourite with rail enthusiasts. Another locomotive repainted in a special livery was 50019 Ramillies, which was repainted in a variation of BR Blue by staff at Plymouth Laira depot.

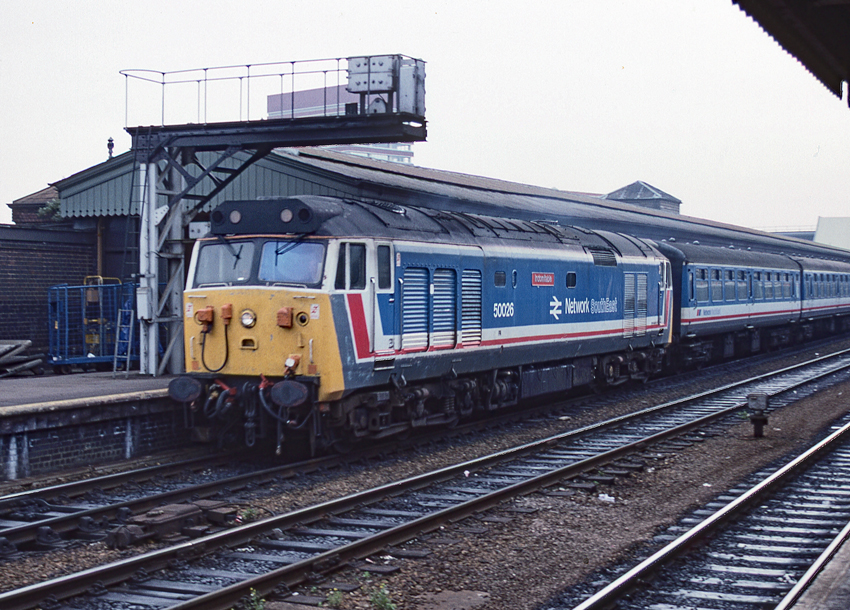
50026 Indomitable in early NSE livery at Reading, 1989

In 1986 the West of England Main Line came under the control of the Network SouthEast (NSE) sector, which saw the introduction of their bright blue, red and white livery. Two locomotives were repainted ready for the launch day on 10 June 1986, 50023 Howe and 50017 Royal Oak. In NSE livery, the nameplates were moved to a higher bodyside position. 50017 was the only member of the class to have one nameplate moved to an incorrect position, above the NSE branding, something which has been replicated in preservation. The third class member to be painted in the NSE scheme was 50035 "Ark Royal". Following an intermediate overhaul at Doncaster, the loco was released painted in grey primer, and worked a service train back to the Western Region as far as Bristol on 15 July 1986, prior to running to Old Oak Common depot for the NSE livery to be applied. The NSE livery had three versions; the original had upswept red, white and grey stripes at the ends, with white cab window surrounds, and a black roof; the first revision which came in 1987 had the red and white stripes continue to the body ends, with blue cab window surrounds, the original shade of blue was retained, 50044 Exeter and 50050 Fearless being the first two treated. The second revision and third variation of the NSE livery appeared in 1989, when the blue became a darker shade, 50043 Eagle and 50023 Howe, being the first two to appear. In 1990, Old Oak Common depot painted 50033 "Glorious" in NSE livery, and left the nameplates in their original position, so that the result read "Glorious Network SouthEast". To summarise, twenty-nine Class 50s received NSE livery, 50017 Royal Oak and 50048 Dauntless were the only locomotives to be painted in all three variations.

Towards the end of the 1980s, the fleet could be found mostly on the West of England route, as well as fast services from Paddington to Oxford. Some locomotives were also transferred to the civil engineers department to work maintenance and engineering trains. Around this time, the first locomotives were withdrawn, starting with 50011 Centurion in early 1987. This locomotive's nameplates were later transferred to 50040, which was previously named Leviathan. A further two locomotives, 50006 Neptune and 50014 Warspite were withdrawn in 1987, followed by a further five locomotives in 1988 (50010/13/22/38/47).

In 1987, consideration was given to using the class on freight trains. To this end, 50049 Defiance was renumbered to 50149, equipped with modified Class 37, lower-geared bogies and outshopped in the new trainload grey livery with Railfreight General decals. It was based at Plymouth Laira depot, and tested on local china clay trains in Cornwall as well as heavy stone trains to London from Devon quarries. The project was, however, not an outstanding success and by 1989 the locomotive had been returned to its original identity. Ironically, the electronic anti-wheelslip equipment, with which the entire class had originally been built and which would have been key to the success of this experiment, had been removed during the refurbishment process.

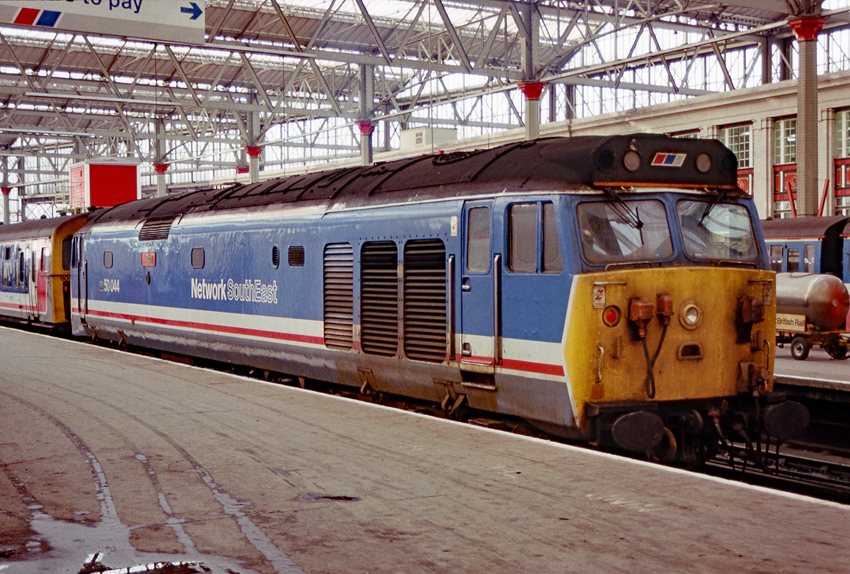
50044 Exeter in Network South East livery at London Waterloo

At the start of the 1990s, the reliability of the fleet became a problem again. By this time, the class was solely used on the West of England route, having been replaced on the Oxford route by Class 47/4 locomotives, displaced from Railfreight Distribution after the collapse of Speedlink in 1991. Arguably, the Class 50s were not suitable for the stop-start service pattern of Waterloo-Exeter services, nor to the extended single-line sections of this route, where a single locomotive failure could cause chaos. Therefore, the decision was taken to retire the remainder of the fleet, temporarily replacing them with Class 47/7 locomotives, which were in turn replaced by new diesel multiple units. From 1992, the Oxford route was worked by Class 165 and Class 166 units, whilst Class 159 units were introduced onto the West of England route in 1993.

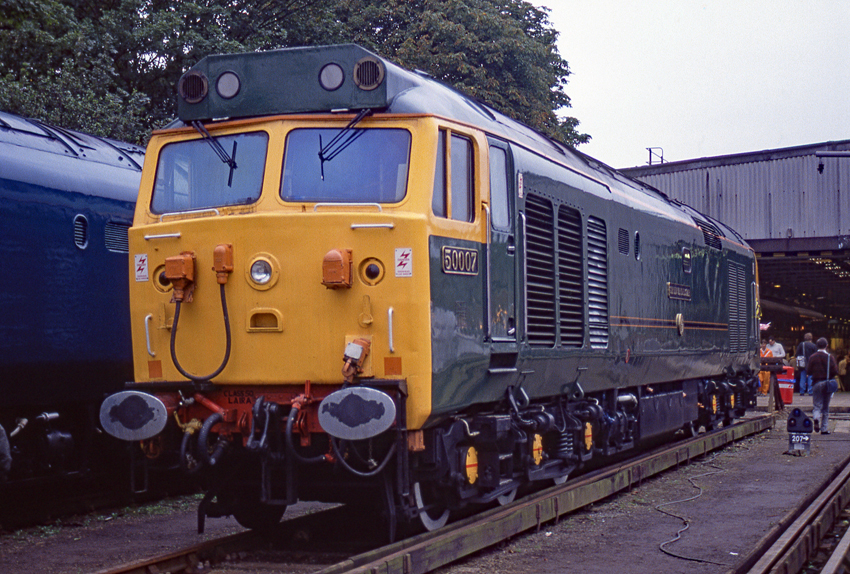
50007 Sir Edward Elgar at Bournemouth Open Day, 1992

By 1992, just eight locomotives remained in service, these being 50007/008/015/029/030/033/046/050. Several of these locomotives were specially repainted to commemorate the run-down of the fleet. The first-built locomotive, 50050 Fearless was renumbered D400 and painted in its original BR Blue livery. Two other locomotives, 50008 Thunderer and 50015 Valiant were also repainted, the former in a variation of BR Blue (the same as 50019 had previously carried), and the latter in "Dutch" civil-engineers grey/yellow livery. Of the final eight locomotives, three were retained until 1994 for use on special railtours, these being 50007 Sir Edward Elgar, 50033 Glorious and 50050 Fearless. 50007 was returned to working order using parts from 50046, which surrendered its recently overhauled power unit and bogies. By this time, 50050 had been repainted into Large Logo livery and 50007 also received a repaint into GWR green as the 1985 paint was wearing very thin. The final railtours operated in March 1994, during one of which 50033 was delivered for preservation at the National Railway Museum. The final railtour operated with 50007 and 50050 from London Waterloo to Penzance and returning to London Paddington. Both locomotives were later preserved.

== Accidents and incidents ==
- On 23 November 1983, a sleeper train hauled by 50 041 Bulwark was derailed on the approach to Paddington due to excessive speed through a crossover. Three of the seventy passengers were injured.
- On 6 August 1989, 50025 Invincible was derailed at West Ealing whilst hauling the 21:15 Oxford to Paddington service. The cause was a length of rail that vandals had placed across the track. There were no fatalities and the locomotive was subsequently scrapped in October that year.

== Fleet list ==
Key:	Scrapped	Preserved

Number		Name	Built	Named	Withdrawn	Status	Notes
Pre-TOPS	TOPS	Name	Built	Named	Withdrawn	Status	Notes
D400	50050	Fearless	17.10.67	23.08.78	26.03.94	Preserved	Carried nameplate 04.08.78 – 07.08.78. Now owned by Boden Rail Engineering Ltd.
D401	50001	Dreadnought	09.12.67	10.04.78	19.04.91	Scrapped	Scrapped at Booth-Roe scrapyard, Rotherham in December 2002.
D402	50002	Superb	12.67	21.03.78	09.09.91	Preserved	Preserved by the Devon Diesel Society. It is currently being restored at the South Devon Railway in Buckfastleigh.
D403	50003	Temeraire	01.68	09.05.78	15.07.91	Scrapped	Scrapped at MC Metals scrapyard, Glasgow in April 1992.
D404	50004	St Vincent	12.67	09.05.78	22.06.90	Scrapped	Scrapped at Booth-Roe scrapyard, Rotherham in May 1992.
D405	50005	Collingwood	01.68	05.04.78	11.12.90	Scrapped	Scrapped at Old Oak Common TMD, London in February 1991.
D406	50006	Neptune	04.68	25.09.79	20.07.87	Scrapped	First Class 50 to be refurbished. Scrapped at Vic Berry's scrapyard, Leicester in February–March 1988.
D407	50007	Hercules	03.68	06.04.78	16.07.91 / 26.03.94	Preserved	Renamed Sir Edward Elgar on 25.02.84. Originally withdrawn in 1991. Reinstated for railtour use in 1992. Renamed back to Hercules in early 2014. Now owned by Class 50 Alliance.
D408	50008	Thunderer	03.68	01.09.78	05.06.92	Active	Owned by Hanson & Hall Rail Solutions, returned to mainline in June 2021
D409	50009	Conqueror	03.68	08.05.78	11.01.91	Scrapped	Scrapped at Old Oak Common TMD, London in February 1991.
D410	50010	Monarch	03.68	16.03.78	27.09.88	Scrapped	Scrapped at Laira TMD, Plymouth by Coopers in May 1992.
D411	50011	Centurion	04.68	17.09.79	24.02.87	Scrapped	First Class 50 to be withdrawn. Scrapped at Crewe Works by Texas Metals in September 1992.
D412	50012	Benbow	04.68	03.04.78	16.01.89	Scrapped	Scrapped at Vic Berry's scrapyard, Leicester in July 1989.
D413	50013	Agincourt	04.68	19.04.78	06.04.88	Scrapped	Scrapped at Old Oak Common TMD, London in July 1989.
D414	50014	Warspite	05.68	30.05.78	14.12.87	Scrapped	Scrapped at Vic Berry's scrapyard, Leicester in May–July 1989.
D415	50015	Valiant	04.68	21.04.78	05.06.92	Preserved	Owned by the Bury Valiant Group.
D416	50016	Barham	05.68	03.04.78	03.08.90	Scrapped	Scrapped at Booth-Roe scrapyard, Rotherham in June 1992.
D417	50017	Royal Oak	04.68	24.04.78	09.09.91	Preserved	Owned by Michael Gregory, Great Central Railway as of February 2019.
D418	50018	Resolution	04.68	06.04.78	22.07.91	Scrapped	Scrapped at MC Metals scrapyard, Glasgow in January 1993.
D419	50019	Ramillies	05.68	18.04.78	19.09.90	Preserved	Owned by the Class 50 Locomotive Association, Mid Norfolk Railway.
D420	50020	Revenge	05.68	07.07.78	27.07.90	Scrapped	Scrapped at Booth-Roe scrapyard, Rotherham in June 1992.
D421	50021	Rodney	05.68	31.07.78	17.04.90	Preserved	Owned by Paul Spracklen, Eastleigh Works.
D422	50022	Anson	05.68	20.04.78	20.09.88	Scrapped	Scrapped at Vic Berry's scrapyard, Leicester in May–June 1989.
D423	50023	Howe	06.68	17.05.78	15.10.90	Scrapped	Scrapped at Barrow Hill, Chesterfield in March 2004.
D424	50024	Vanguard	06.68	15.05.78	01.02.91	Scrapped	Scrapped at Old Oak Common TMD, London in July 1991.
D425	50025	Invincible	07.68	06.06.78	14.08.89	Scrapped	Scrapped at Old Oak Common TMD in October 1989, after derailment at West Ealing in August 1989. The derailment was a result of vandals placing an object onto the track, causing the loco to overturn.
D426	50026	Indomitable	07.68	29.03.78	11.12.90	Preserved	Owned by Paul Spracklen.
D427	50027	Lion	06.68	17.04.78	23.07.91	Preserved	Privately owned. Based at the Mid-Hants Railway. It was based at the North Yorkshire Moors Railway from 1992 until 13 June 2012.
D428	50028	Tiger	07.68	10.05.78	01.02.91	Scrapped	Scrapped at Old Oak Common TMD, London in July 1991.
D429	50029	Renown	07.68	26.10.78	25.03.92	Preserved	Owned by the Renown Repulse Restoration Group.
D430	50030	Repulse	07.68	10.04.78	08.04.92	Preserved	Owned by the Renown Repulse Restoration Group.
D431	50031	Hood	07.68	28.06.78	05.08.91	Preserved	Operated by the Class 50 Alliance.
D432	50032	Courageous	07.68	07.07.78	15.10.90	Scrapped	Scrapped at Old Oak Common TMD, London in February 1991.
D433	50033	Glorious	08.68	26.06.78	25.03.94	Preserved	Currently based at the Severn Valley Railway.
D434	50034	Furious	08.68	06.04.78	29.06.90	Scrapped	Scrapped at Old Oak Common TMD, London in February 1991.
D435	50035	Ark Royal	08.68	17.01.78	03.08.90	Preserved	First to be named and preserved. Owned by the Class 50 Alliance. Currently based at the Severn Valley Railway.
D436	50036	Victorious	09.68	16.05.78	12.04.91	Scrapped	Scrapped at Booth-Roe scrapyard, Rotherham in July 1992.
D437	50037	Illustrious	09.68	08.06.78	09.09.91	Scrapped	Scrapped at MC Metals scrapyard, Glasgow in December 1992. One cab preserved at the Llanelli & Mynydd Mawr Railway. Second cab stored at Peak Rail with Renown Repulse Restoration Group locos 50029 & 50030
D438	50038	Formidable	10.68	05.05.78	27.09.88	Scrapped	Scrapped at Old Oak Common TMD, London in July 1989.
D439	50039	Implacable	10.68	20.06.78	04.06.89	Scrapped	Scrapped at Old Oak Common TMD, London in July 1991.
D440	50040	Leviathan	10.68	15.09.78	03.08.90	Scrapped	Scrapped at Sims Metal Management, Halesowen in June–July 2008.
D441	50041	Bulwark	10.68	08.05.78	17.04.90	Scrapped	Scrapped at Old Oak Common TMD, London in July 1991.
D442	50042	Triumph	10.68	04.10.78	15.10.90	Preserved	Preserved at the Bodmin and Wenford Railway.
D443	50043	Eagle	10.68	28.06.78	01.02.91	Scrapped	Scrapped for spares at Blaenavon by Rexstar in January 2002.
D444	50044	Exeter	11.68	26.04.78	11.01.91	Preserved	Owned by the Class 50 Alliance.
D445	50045	Achilles	11.68	12.04.78	11.12.90	Scrapped	Scrapped at Booth-Roe scrapyard, Rotherham in April 2000.
D446	50046	Ajax	12.68	11.10.78	25.03.92	Scrapped	Scrapped at MC Metals scrapyard, Glasgow in June 1992. One cab privately preserved near Looe, Cornwall.
D447	50047	Swiftsure	12.68	26.05.78	13.04.88	Scrapped	Scrapped at Vic Berry's scrapyard, Leicester in April–June 1989.
D448	50048	Dauntless	12.68	16.03.78	15.07.91	Scrapped	Scrapped at MC Metals scrapyard, Glasgow in April 1992.
D449	50049; 50149	Defiance	12.68	02.05.78	16.08.91	Preserved	Owned by the Class 50 Alliance. 50149 carried during trial of using the class on freight trains.

== Portuguese locomotives ==
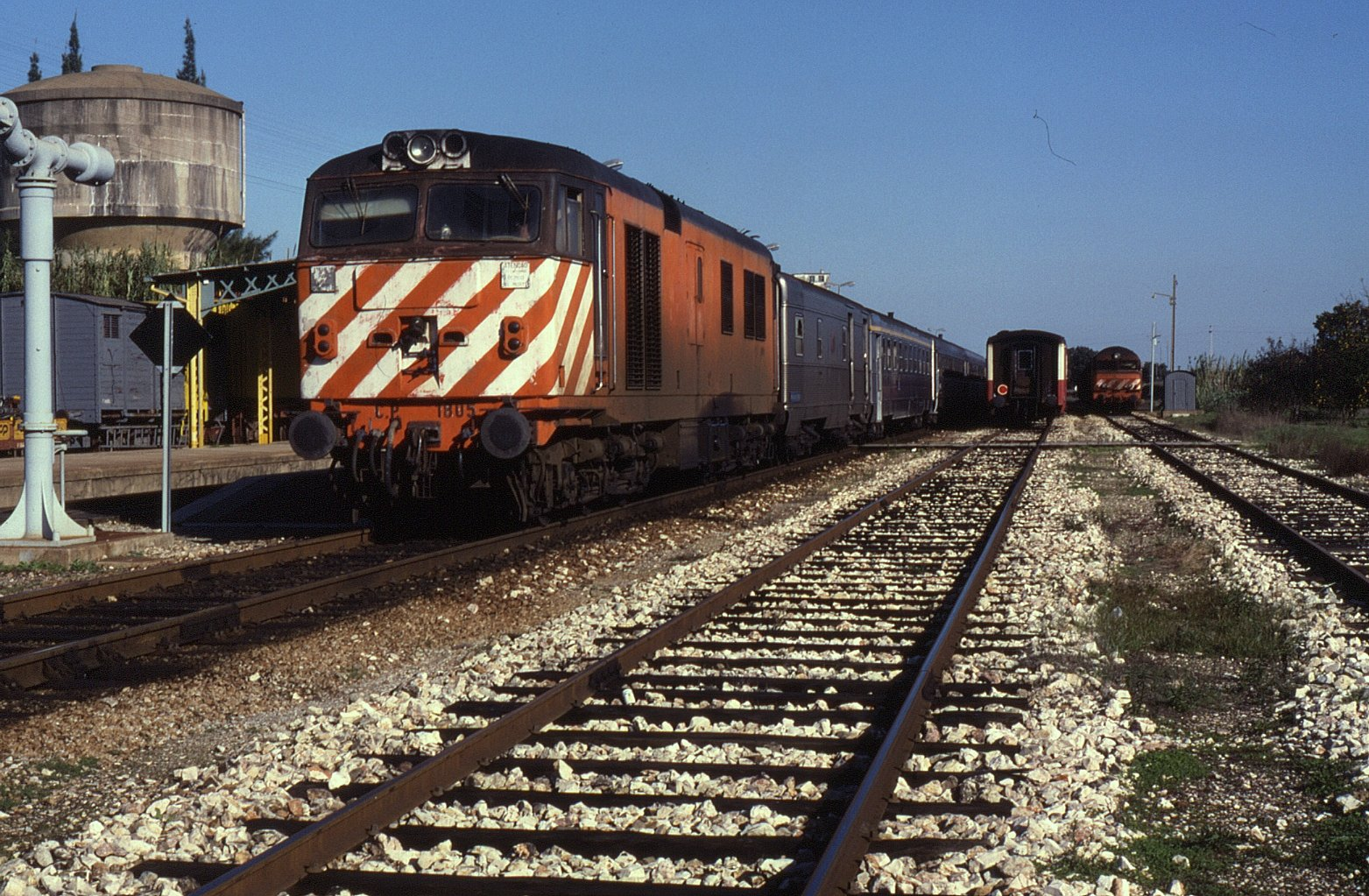
En route from Barreiro to Vila Real de Santo António in 1990, locomotive 1805 pauses at Ermidas Sado where it was booked to cross over with a northbound train.

The Portuguese Railways, CP, bought ten locomotives similar to the BR Class 50, but built to Iberian track gauge (1,668 mm). These locomotives, designated by CP as "Série 1800" (numbered 1801–1810), entered service in 1968.

Like the British Class 50s, they were equipped with an English Electric 16 CSVT engine and produced 2700 hp (2020 HP at the wheels). Unlike the BR locomotives upon which electronic control is extensively used, the Portuguese locomotives employ conventional control gear (the only exceptions being stepless control of tractive effort by a solid-state load regulator and the use of a very effective out-of-balance wheel-slip detector). The main generator and the traction motors are identical to those used on the BR Type 3 and Deltic locomotives. Contrary to BR Class 50, the Portuguese Série 1800 locomotives were built to be as much compatible with the smaller Série 1400 (themselves similar to BR Class 20) as possible and also to use as many common components as possible.

They were the only diesel locomotives in Portugal authorised to run at 140 km/h. The CP Série 1800s were all withdrawn in 2001 and (as of 2012) several have been cut up, and the future of the rest is unclear.

Locomotive 1805 has been preserved in operational condition by the Portuguese National Railway Museum at Entroncamento. Since the 1980s it had been painted in CP's corporate orange livery, but it has been repainted in its original distinctive blue livery by the CP workshop at Contumil near Porto. While still an integral part of the National Railway Museum, it is set to return to service pulling tourist trains on the Douro River Line.

== Preservation ==
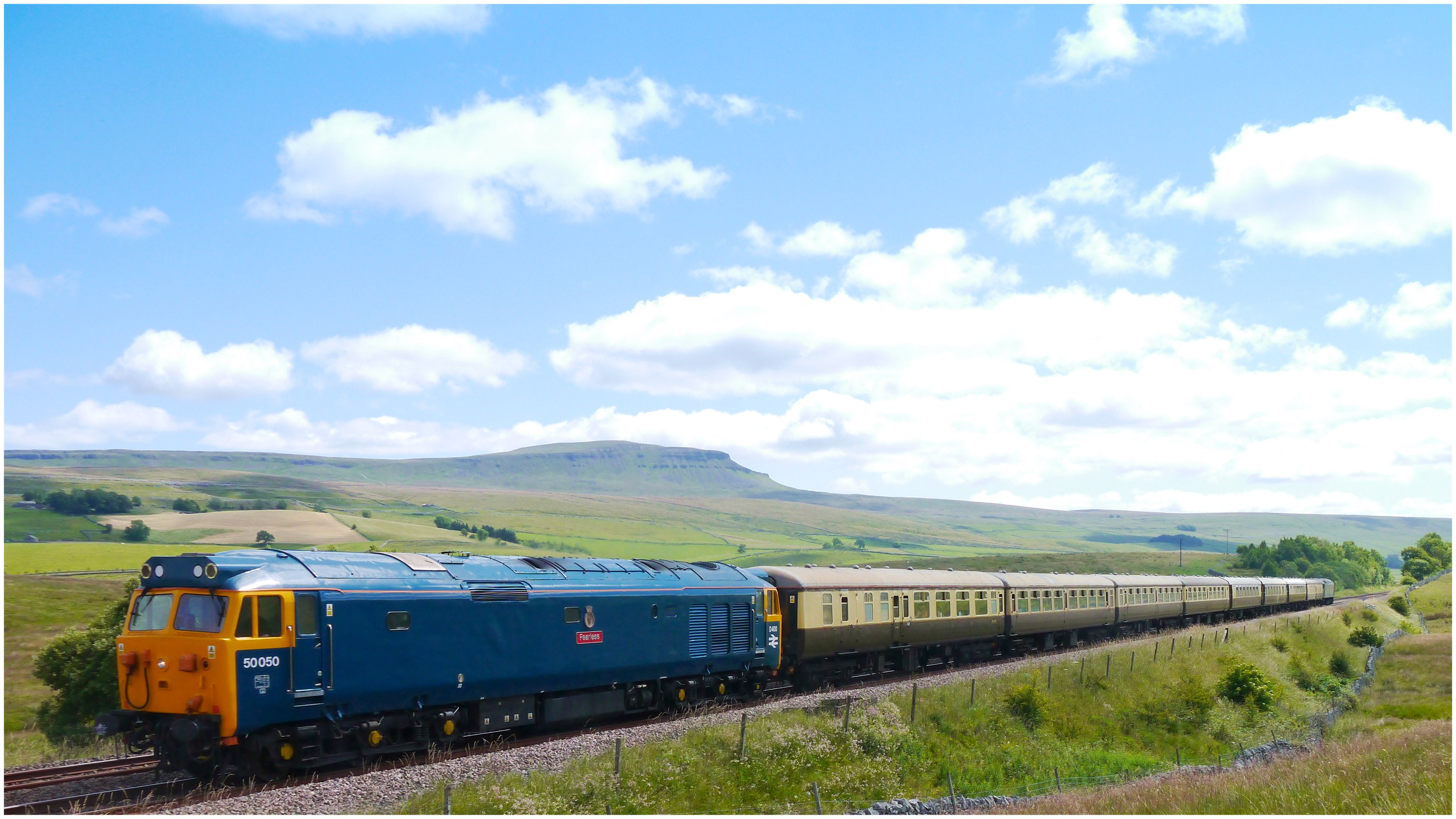
D400 Fearless, the first Class 50 to be built in 1967, seen here on the Settle & Carlisle Railway, 2022

Class 50 locomotives proved popular with rail enthusiasts, with eighteen locomotives, including the first production unit, saved for preservation and several subsequently registered for use on the mainline.

An ambitious project involving preserved Class 50s was "Operation Collingwood", an engineering charity established in the early 1990s. The aim had been to train young engineering apprentices by getting them to rebuild railway locomotives and Class 50s were chosen both for the fact that they were a British design throughout and that all were named (so the apprentices would derive some pride from rededication ceremonies at the completion of their work). To this end, Operation Collingwood purchased and stored 50001, 50023, 50029, 50030, 50040 and 50045. All except 50029 and 50030 were heavily stripped examples sold to scrapyards for final cutting up. The intention was to restore them by using industrial sponsorship money to build an engineering centre and overhaul the components, making brand new ones where necessary to overcome lack of availability of some parts unique to the original design. These ambitions failed when sponsorship did not reach the required level and the project lost various key people. The charity was wound up in 2002; 50001/023/040 and 045 were sold back to scrapyards and their state as little more than bodyshells deterred most further preservation attempts. 50045 was scrapped to provide spares for preserved 50026, and 50001 met a similar fate. A private individual made an attempt to restore 50023 using some parts from 50001 but this was abandoned and the shell was cut up a few years after the initial purchase. 50040 could have been suitable for cosmetic restoration, but after many years untouched and in a derelict state at the Coventry Railway Centre, it finally had all remaining parts stripped for spares and was transported to Sims Metals of Halesowen for scrapping. The cutting of the derelict hulk was completed by Wednesday 2 July 2008. 50029 and 50030 were in far better mechanical condition, and were sold to a preservation group for full restoration.

50043 Eagle was purchased in almost working order (the main generator had failed, a very common Class 50 problem) but it was never intended for restoration. Instead the power unit was gutted to provide parts for preserved Class 40 no. 40118 as the two share a very similar design of diesel engine. Eagle was then subjected to a further bout of stripping when electrical and other parts were sold to various Class 50 preservationists. Although cosmetically very smart, the loco was by this stage unrestorable and although an ambitious private individual did try, this effort soon came to naught and it was scrapped to provide parts for 50026 Indomitable. 50026 itself was rescued from Booth's Scrapyard in 1993.

Once preserved, 50002 became the first class 50 to operate a train for a private excursion on the South Devon Railway (April 1992), while 50031 was the first to operate a train for fare paying passengers (Severn Valley Railway May 1992). 50031 was also the first to operate on the mainline, hauling the Past Time Railtours Pilgrim Hoover train from Birmingham International to Plymouth on 1 November 1997. Since then several other members of the class have also been passed for use on Network Rail (was Railtrack) lines. However, with changes in the UK's Rail Access regulations (requiring fitment of additional equipment: TPWS/OTMR/GSMR) some of these locos are no longer of a standard to continue mainline operation. At present, 50007, 50008, 50044, 50049 & 50050 are passed for main line running. The owner of 50021 & 50026 aims to restore them to mainline use in the near future.

One locomotive, 50017, was hired to Venice Simplon Orient Express (VSOE) to work the Northern Belle service from Bath to Manchester Victoria. As part of the contract it was painted in LMS-style maroon livery. Following this, the loco spent several years dumped at Tyseley locomotive works before being sold to a private individual. The loco was then restored to working order at the Plym Valley Railway, before being sold to Boden Railway Engineering a few years later. In Feb 2019 the engine was sold from Boden Rail to the Great Central Railway minus its mainline equipment.

In 2003, the National Railway Museum decided to dispose of 50033 due to an inability to commit to maintenance and storage costs. This was subject to a suitable owner being found for what was now a museum asset. After spending a period on loan to the North Yorkshire Moors Railway in 2004 the locomotive was moved to the Swindon Steam Railway Museum. However, soon after it was sent on to the Tyseley Locomotive Works as part of a proposed move to the RailSchool project and Royal Docks Heritage Railway in North Woolwich, London. When the Crossrail project was authorised, this scheme fell by the wayside, stranding 50033 at the Birmingham Railway Museum (Tyseley). After a period the ownership of the loco was transferred between the museums in lieu of storage payments. Unfortunately due to lack of covered accommodation the loco was stored in the open. This situation ended in February 2018, when an agreement between the Birmingham Railway Museum and the Fifty Fund was reached to return the locomotive to operational use. As part of this arrangement the locomotive was moved to the Severn Valley Railway in May of the same year. After an intense restoration effort the loco hauled trains at the Class 50 Golden Anniversary Gala in October 2018. As the loco was still in undercoat, it was possible for gala attendees to graffiti the loco body for a payment towards its full repaint – an exercise that raised over £3,800.

In 2005, 50031 and 50049 were on long term hire to Arriva Trains Wales (ATW), for use on special services in connection with events at the Millennium Stadium, and over the summer period saw regular use on the Monday to Saturday "Fishguard Flyer" from Cardiff to Fishguard and return, in connection with the ferry sailing to Ireland. One of the two locomotives was used for the service each day, along with 4 Mark 2 coaches, the short formation and high power leading to very good performance. This arrangement lasted for one year. At the end of this period 50031 failed whilst working an ECS (Empty Coaching Stock) train, again for ATW.

During the summer of 2008 50044 "Exeter" was fitted with OTMR, and the TPWS fitted previously was commissioned. In October 2008 '44 was re-registered for mainline use, and operated its first revenue mainline train on 18 October 2008, when it worked, in multiple with 50049 "Defiance" on a railtour from Manchester Piccadilly to Minehead.

Several owning groups have ceremonially re-dedicated their locomotives to the warships whose names they carry. The HMS Hood Association rededicated 50031 Hood at the Mid Hants Railway, unveiling new crests. The crew of HMS Exeter re-dedicated D444 Exeter at the Severn Valley Railway a year before the vessel was decommissioned, unveiling a crest and early-BR-style nameplates. The captain of HMS Ark Royal performed the re-dedication ceremony for 50135 Ark Royal at the Eastleigh 100 Open Days.

October 2018 saw the Severn Valley Railway host the 'Class 50 Golden Jubilee' gala, celebrating fifty years since the class was introduced into traffic. Eleven of the eighteen preserved 50s attended the event, these being: 50007, 50008, 50015, 50017, 50026 (non-operational), 50031, 50033, 50035, 50044, 50049 and 50050. This made it the largest gathering of a single type of locomotive in preservation history. Of significance was 50033, which had undergone a speedy overhaul since transferring to the railway in May of that year, hauling its first passenger trains since 2004.

Seven of the preserved Class 50s have operated on the mainline in preservation, these being: 50050 Fearless, 50007 Hercules, 50008 Thunderer, 50017 Royal Oak, 50031 Hood, 50044 Exeter and 50049 Defiance.

=== List of preserved locomotives ===
Numbers (Current in Bold)			Name	Image	Livery	Location	Notes
**D400**	**50050**	-	Fearless		BR Blue	Nottingham Eastcroft TMD	Owned by Boden Rail Engineering Ltd. First-built locomotive. Operational, Mainline certified
**D402**	50002	-	Superb		BR Blue	South Devon Railway	Under restoration.
D407	**50007**	-	Hercules		BR Blue Large Logo	Severn Valley Railway	Operational, Mainline Certified. On spot-hire to GBRf.
D408	**50008**	-	Thunderer		Hanson & Hall	Kings Norton	Re-entered preservation in 2006. Repainted by ELR 2009–2010. Operational, Mainline Certified 2017
D415	**50015**	-	Valiant		BR Blue Large Logo	East Lancashire Railway	Only Class 50 to carry "Dutch" civil-engineers livery in BR ownership. Preserved by Bury Valiant Group Operational
D417	**50017**	50117	Royal Oak		Network SouthEast (Original)	Great Central Railway.	Preserved & Operational. Previously Mainline Certified.
D419	**50019**	-	Ramillies		BR Blue Large Logo	Mid-Norfolk Railway	Taken out of service for works in 2013.
D421	**50021**	-	Rodney		BR Blue Large Logo	Eastleigh	Operational. Restoration completed 2023.
D426	**50026**	-	Indomitable		Network SouthEast (Revised)	Eastleigh	Undergoing maintenance. Fitted with OTMR, TPWS and GSMR equipment for future mainline operation. Currently in the final stages of an engine overhaul.
D427	**50027**	-	Lion		Network SouthEast (Revised)	Mid Hants Railway	Operational
D429	**50029**	-	Renown		BR Blue Large Logo (Black Roof)	Peak Rail	Awaiting Restoration
D430	**50030**	-	Repulse		BR Blue Large Logo	Peak Rail	Under Restoration
D431	**50031**	-	Hood		Intercity Swallow	Severn Valley Railway	Stored out of service, awaiting repairs. Currently carries non-prototypical Intercity livery.
D433	**50033**	-	Glorious	50033 Kidderminster Depot 20 May 23	BR Blue Large Logo	Severn Valley Railway	Previously at Swindon Steam Railway Museum and Tyseley Locomotive Works. Operational.
D435	**50035**	50135	Ark Royal		BR Blue	Severn Valley Railway	Operational.
D442	**50042**	-	Triumph		BR Blue Large Logo (Black Roof)	Bodmin & Wenford Railway	Operational.
D444	**50044**	-	Exeter		BR Blue	Severn Valley Railway	Operational. Mainline Certified.
D449	**50049**	50149	Defiance		BR Blue Large Logo	Severn Valley Railway	Operational. Mainline Certified. On spot-hire to GBRf.

== Model railways ==
Lima produced the first model of the Class 50 in OO gauge – initially in unrefurbished condition – with Graham Farish producing the type in British N gauge. Neither of these models are now available new, but second-hand models do appear from time to time.

In 2003, Hornby Railways launched its first version of the BR Class 50 in OO gauge. Hornby have since updated the Class 50 and have produced models of 50007 Hercules and 50049 Defiance in GBRF colours as part of their 2020 range.

Recently, Heljan have also made models of Class 50 in O gauge which includes 50007 Hercules as Sir Edward Elgar in GWR green, 50149 Defiance in BR Railfreight general sector triple grey, 50017 Valiant in BR Civil Engineers 'Dutch' grey and yellow and 50008 Thunderer in BR Laira Blue as well as unnamed and unnumbered 50s in BR Blue, and in the original and revised Network South East livery.

Dapol have also released a model of the Class 50 in British N gauge which include samples in BR Blue, BR large logo Blue and the original NSE livery.

Accurascale announced in November 2022 that they would be producing a newly tooled OO gauge Class 50 model, based on a 3D laser scan taken of locomotive 50017 at the Great Central Railway in 2019.
