= 10th Submarine Squadron (United Kingdom) =

- Active: 1966 – October 1993
- Country: United Kingdom
- Branch: Royal Navy
- Size: Squadron
- Garrison/HQ: Faslane

The 10th Submarine Squadron was an administrative unit of the Royal Navy.

== History ==
The squadron was formed at HMNB Clyde, Faslane, Scotland, in the 1960s to direct the Resolution-class submarines equipped with Polaris missiles that formed part of the United Kingdom's strategic nuclear deterrent. The four Resolution-class submarines would carry out a total of 229 operational patrols during their time in service with the squadron.

The squadron would later direct the Vanguard-class submarines equipped with Trident missiles.

In October 1993 the 3rd and 10th Squadrons at Faslane amalgamated into a new 1st Submarine Squadron (Watson).

In February 2002 all existing squadrons were disbanded and replaced by three flotillas at the base ports of Devonport, Faslane and Portsmouth.

== Submarines ==
Name	Laid down	Launched	Commissioned	Maiden patrol	Fate
HMS Resolution	26 February 1964	15 September 1966	2 October 1967		decommissioned 1994
HMS Repulse	12 March 1965	4 November 1967	28 September 1968		decommissioned 1996
HMS Renown	25 June 1964	25 February 1967	15 November 1968		decommissioned 1996
HMS Revenge	19 May 1965	15 March 1968	4 December 1969		decommissioned 1992
HMS Vanguard	3 September 1986	4 March 1992	14 August 1993	December 1994	in service
HMS Victorious	3 December 1987	29 September 1993	7 January 1995	December 1995	in service
HMS Vigilant	16 February 1991	14 October 1995	2 November 1996	June 1998	in service
HMS Vengeance	1 February 1993	19 September 1998	27 November 1999	February 2001	in service

== See also ==
- List of squadrons and flotillas of the Royal Navy
- 10th Submarine Flotilla
