= English Electric Type 4 =

English Electric Type 4 may refer to:

- British Rail Class 40
- British Rail Class 50
