= Ramillies =

Ramillies may refer to:

- Ramillies, Belgium, a municipality in Walloon Brabant
- Ramillies, Nord, France, a commune
- Battle of Ramillies, fought in 1706 at Ramillies, Belgium
- HMS Ramillies, several vessels of the Royal Navy named after the battle
- Ramillies-class ship of the line, a class of nine 74-gun third rates, after the 1763 HMS Ramillies
