= Rosyth Dockyard =

Naval dockyard in Fife, Scotland

Coordinates: 56°1′14″N 3°27′12″W

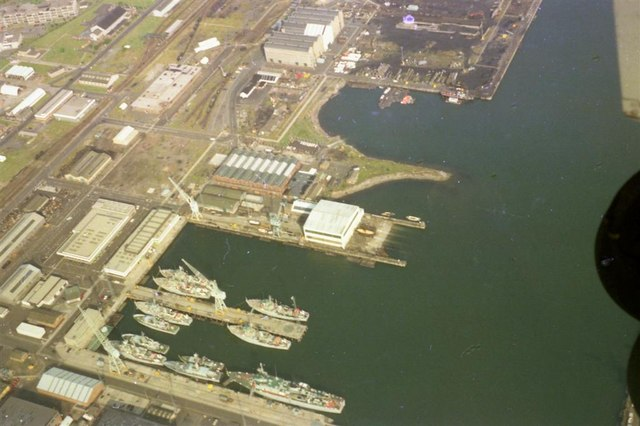
Rosyth Dockyard in 1975

Rosyth Dockyard /rəˈsaɪθ/ is a large naval dockyard on the Firth of Forth at Rosyth, Fife, Scotland, owned by Babcock Marine, which formerly undertook refitting of Royal Navy surface vessels and submarines. Before its privatisation in the 1990s it was the Royal Naval Dockyard Rosyth. Its primary role now is the dismantling of decommissioned nuclear submarines. It is also the integration site for the Royal Navy's newest aircraft carriers, the Queen Elizabeth class as well as the Type 31 Frigate.

== History ==
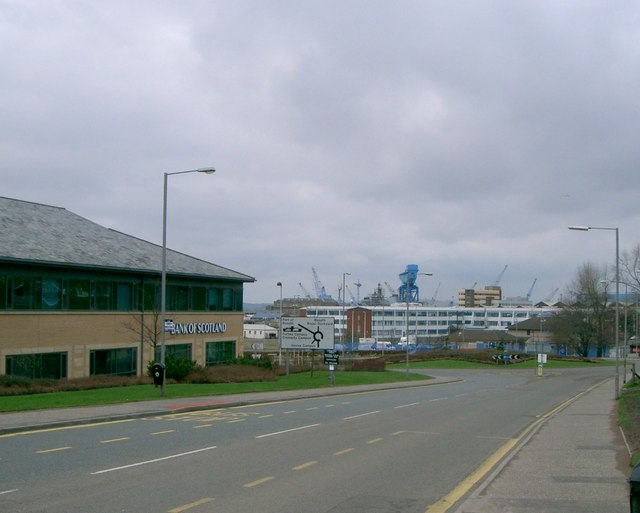
Cranes at the Rosyth Dockyard

Construction of the dockyard by civil engineers Easton, Gibb & Son commenced in 1909. At the time, the Royal Navy was strengthening its presence along the eastern seaboard of Great Britain due to a naval arms race with Germany.

=== First World War ===
In 1903 approval was given with an estimated cost of £3 million for "works" and £250,000 for machinery spread over 10 years. The site consisted of 1,184 acres (479 ha) of land, 285 acres (115 ha) of foreshore, and the main basin would be 52.5 acres (21.2 ha). This was intended to be large enough for 11 battleships or 22 if doubled up.

The yard gained in size and importance during the First World War, with No. 6 Division of the Metropolitan Police set up to patrol it on 1 January 1916 (the Metropolitan Police then provided police for UK dockyards). The first ship to dry dock at Rosyth was the pre-dreadnought battleship HMS Zealandia on 28 March 1916.

=== Interwar years ===
- HMS Magnificent (1894) as an ammunition store ship between October 1918 and 4 February 1920.
- HMS Crescent (1899) as a harbor depot ship between 1 May 1920 and 17 September 1921.
- HMS London (1899) as a minelayer between February 1918 and January 1919.

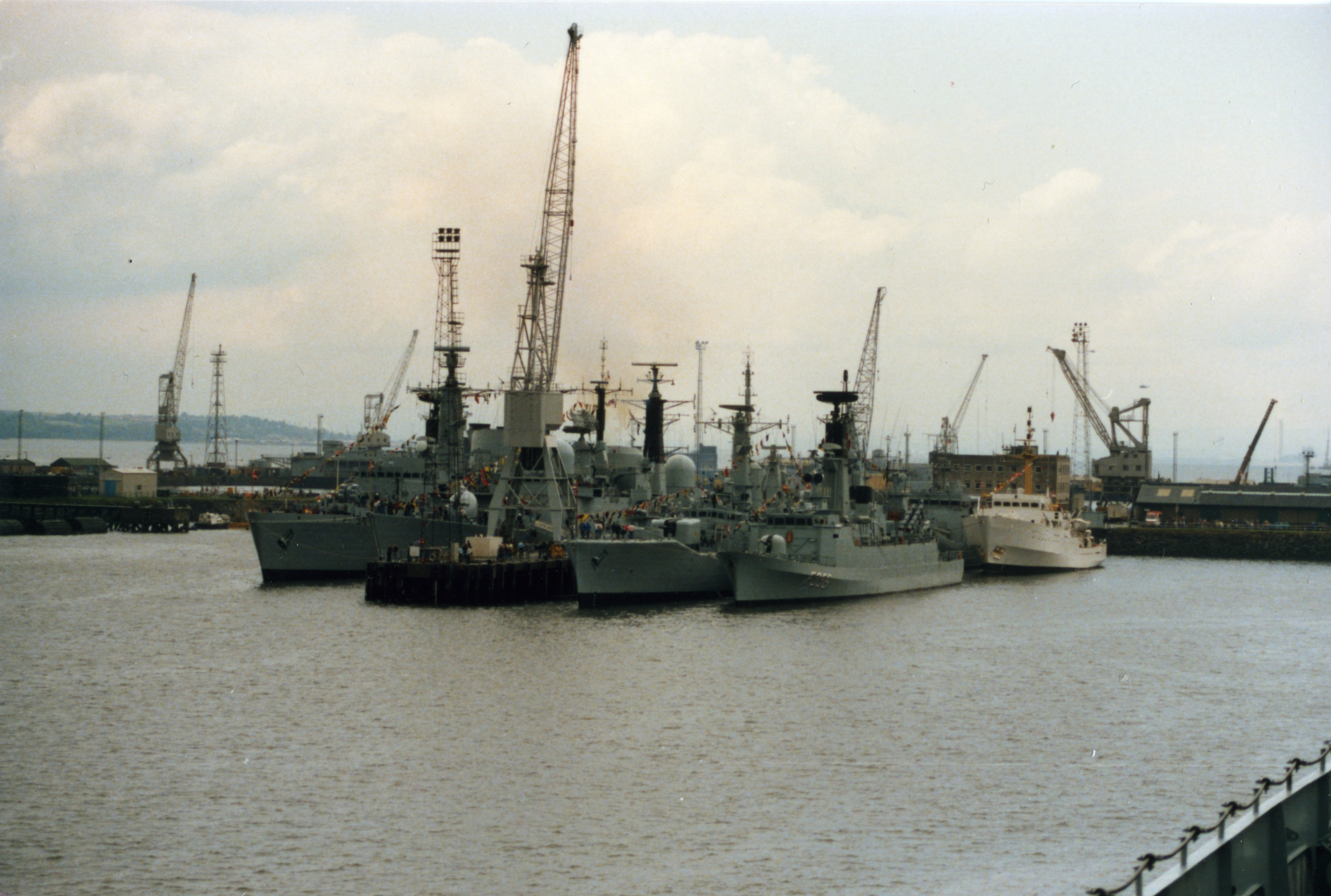
Rosyth Dockyard in 1986

=== World War II ===
Rosyth Naval Dockyard primarily acted as a repair and maintenance base ("serviced") rather than a principal construction site during this period, having been reopened in 1938 just before the war.

Between 1939 and 1945, the dockyard served as a crucial repair and servicing hub for the Royal Navy, focusing on capital ships and destroyers operating in the North Sea. Major vessels serviced included battleships (such as the Queen Elizabeth class), battlecruisers, and cruisers. The dockyard also facilitated the repair of destroyers and provided essential maintenance for the Home Fleet.

=== Privatisation ===
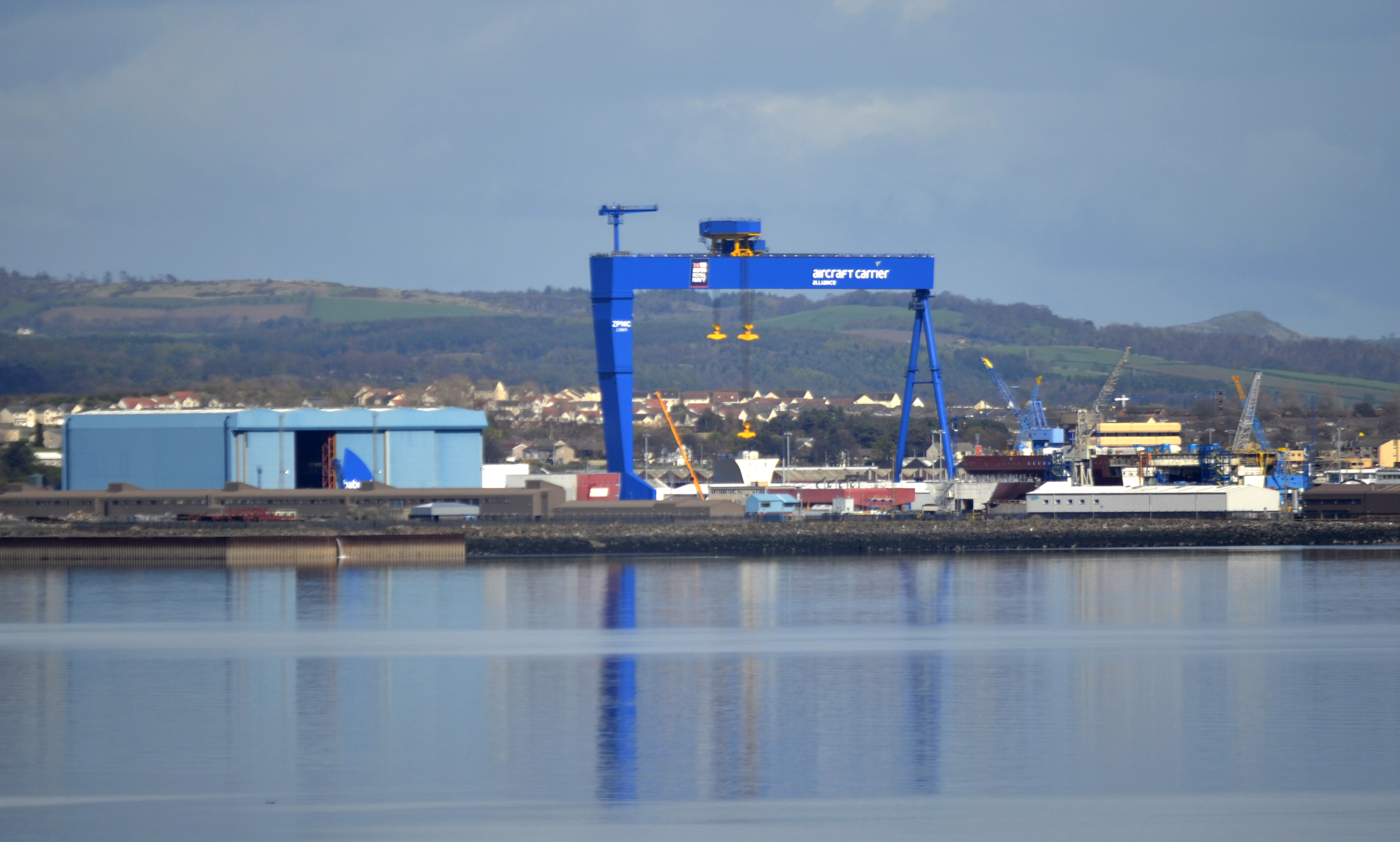
The new Goliath crane at the Dockyard, used for the current assembly of the Royal Navy's new 65,000 tonne aircraft carriers.

Babcock Thorn, a consortium operated by Babcock International and Thorn EMI, was awarded the management contract for Rosyth dockyard in 1987; with Rosyth Dockyard becoming a government owned, contractor run facility. This contract was awarded in parallel with Devonport Management Limited's contract to run Devonport Dockyard, Plymouth. In 1993 the Ministry of Defence announced plans to privatise Rosyth. Babcock International, who had bought out Thorn's share of the original Babcock Thorn consortium, was the only company to submit a bid and after protracted negotiations purchased the yard in January 1997.

=== Nuclear submarine refitting ===
In 1984 Rosyth was chosen as the sole location for refitting the Royal Navy's nuclear submarine fleet (a role it was already specialising in), and in 1986 extensive rebuilding commenced to facilitate this new role. However, in 1993, the government switched the refitting role to Devonport Dockyard.

=== Nuclear submarine decommissioning ===
Seven nuclear submarines were stored at Rosyth in 2007. In 2018, the Public Accounts Committee criticised the slow rate of decommissioning of these submarines, with the Ministry of Defence admitting that it had put off decommissioning due to the cost and is currently due to be finalised in 2035.

- HMS Churchill
- HMS Dreadnought
- HMS Resolution
- HMS Repulse
- HMS Renown
- HMS Revenge
- HMS Swiftsure

=== Queen Elizabeth class aircraft carriers ===
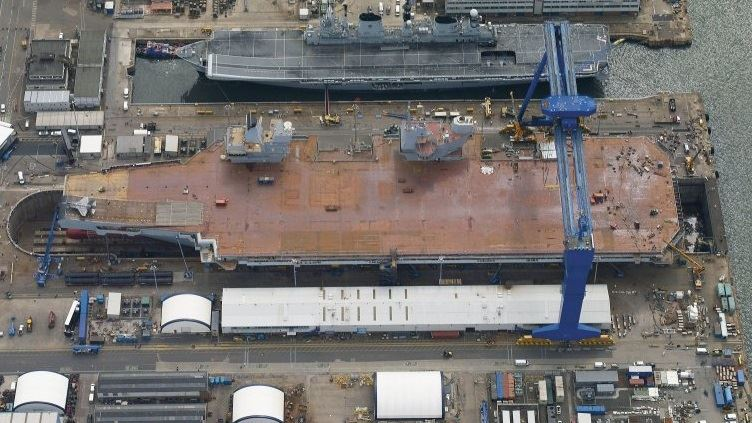
HMS Queen Elizabeth under construction at Rosyth (alongside HMS Illustrious)

The Royal Navy's two Queen Elizabeth-class carriers were constructed across six UK shipyards, with final assembly at Rosyth.

== Today ==
Today, a Ministry of Defence site is based at the former dockyard, MoD Caledonia, which holds a small naval garrison. It was due to close by/in 2022, but its future has now been assured. Babcock are currently building the type 31 frigates at the dockyard.

== Administration of the dockyard ==
The admiral-superintendent was the Royal Navy officer in command of a larger Naval Dockyard. The appointment of admiral-superintendents (or their junior equivalents) dates from 1832 when the Admiralty took charge of the Royal Dockyards. Prior to this larger dockyards were overseen by a commissioner who represented the Navy Board.

=== Admiral-Superintendent, Rosyth ===
Included:

- Rear-Admiral Sir Henry H. Bruce: June 1915 – April 1920
- Vice-Admiral Sir John F. E. Green: April 1920 – June 1923
- Rear-Admiral Colin Cantlie: September 1939 – April 1944
- Rear-Admiral Henry C. Bovell: April 1944 – April 1947
- Vice-Admiral Sir Angus Cunninghame-Graham: April 1947 – August 1951
- Rear-Admiral John H. F. Crombie: August 1951 – November 1953
- Rear-Admiral Peter Skelton: November 1953 – September 1956
- Rear-Admiral Peter D.H.R. Pelly: September 1956 – November 1957
- Rear-Admiral Walter Evershed: November 1957 – September 1960
- Rear-Admiral Ian G. Aylen: September 1960 – September 1963
- Rear-Admiral John G. Watson: September 1963 – September 1966
- Rear-Admiral William T.C. Ridley: September 1966 – September 1971

=== Port Admiral, Rosyth ===
- Rear-Admiral William T.C. Ridley: September 1971 – February 1972
- Rear-Admiral Peter White: February 1972 – April 1974
- Rear-Admiral Anthony J. Monk: April 1974 – January 1976
- Rear-Admiral William T. Pillar: January 1976 – November 1977
- Rear-Admiral John R.D. Nunn: November 1977 – January 1980
- Rear-Admiral James E.C. Kennon: January 1980 – August 1981
- Rear-Admiral John C. Warsop: August 1981 – August 1983
- Vice-Admiral Robert R. Squires: August – December 1983

In the Royal Naval Dockyards, admiral-superintendents ceased to be appointed after 15 September 1971, and existing post-holders were renamed port admirals.

Note: These officers reported to the Flag Officer Scotland and Northern Ireland.

== Bibliography ==
- Burt, Walter (2016). Rosyth Dockyard and Naval Base: Through Time (Paperback). Stroud, Gloucestershire: Amberley Publishing. ISBN 9781445648965.
