= Resolution-class submarine =

Royal Navy ballistic missile submarine class

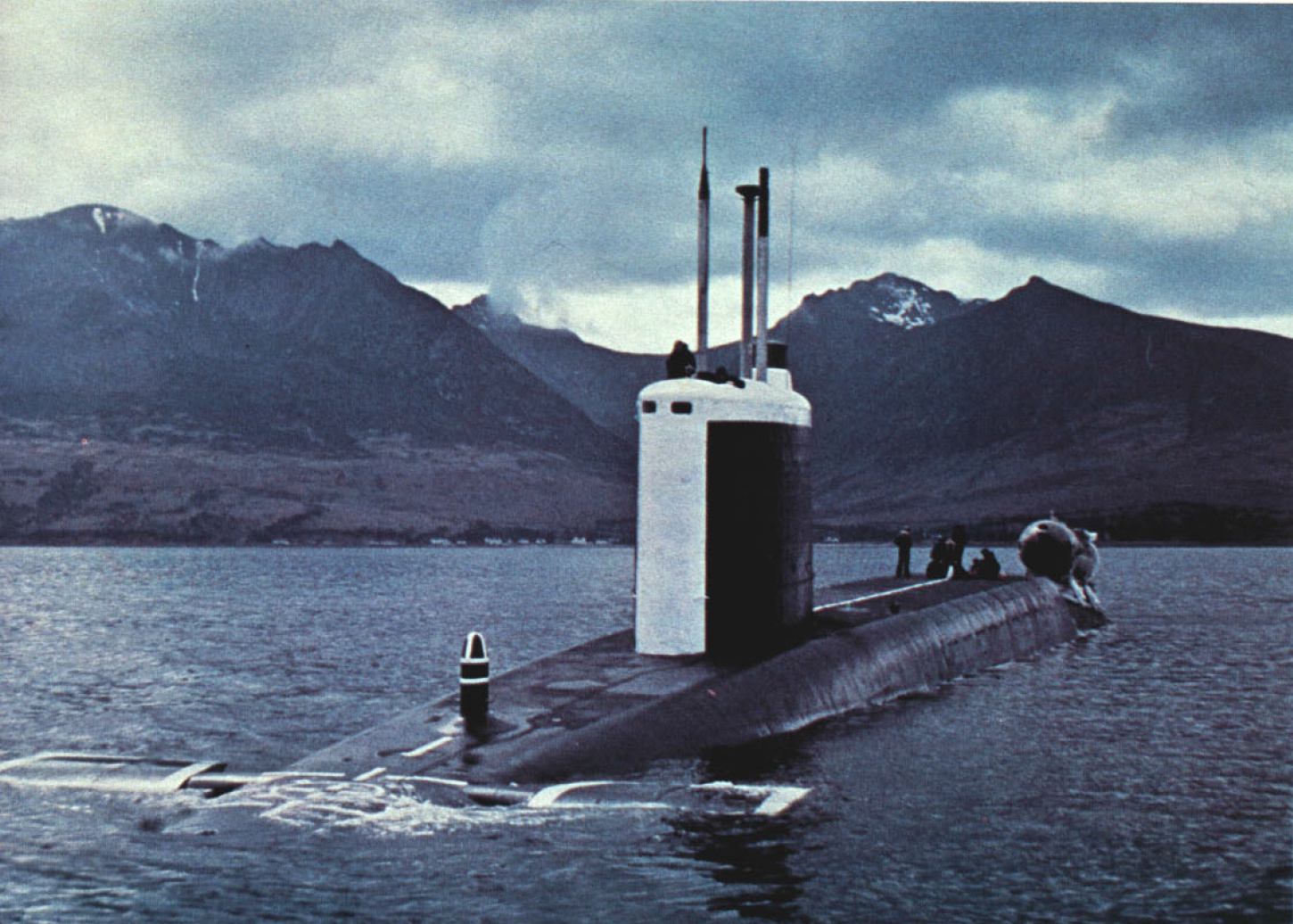
- Repulse in 1979

Class overview
- Name: Resolution class
- Builders: Vickers Shipbuilding Ltd, Barrow-in-Furness; Cammell Laird and Co Ltd, Birkenhead
- Operators: Royal Navy
- Succeeded by: Vanguard class
- Built: 1964–1968
- In service: 1967–1996
- Planned: 5
- Completed: 4
- Cancelled: 1
- Active: 0
- Retired: 4

General characteristics
- Type: Ballistic missile submarine
- Displacement: surfaced: 7,500 long tons (7,600 t); submerged: 8,400 long tons (8,500 t)
- Length: 425 ft (130 m)
- Beam: 33 ft (10 m)
- Draught: 30 ft 1 in (9.17 m)
- Propulsion: 1 × Vickers/Rolls-Royce PWR1 pressurised-water nuclear reactor, 27,500 shp (20.5 MW); Propeller.
- Speed: surfaced: 20 kn (37 km/h); submerged: 25 kn (46 km/h)
- Range: Unlimited except by food supplies
- Complement: 143 (two crews)

The Resolution class was a class of four nuclear ballistic missile submarines (SSBN) built for the Royal Navy as part of the UK Polaris programme. Each submarine was armed with up to 16 UGM-27 Polaris A-3 nuclear missiles.

The class comprised Resolution, Repulse, Renown and Revenge. They were built by Vickers Armstrong in Barrow-in-Furness and Cammell Laird in Birkenhead between 1964 and 1968. All four boats were based at HM Naval Base Clyde (HMS Neptune), 40 km (25 mi) west of Glasgow, Scotland.

The Resolution class was the launch platform for the United Kingdom's strategic nuclear deterrent from the late 1960s until 1996, when it was replaced by the Vanguard-class submarine carrying the Trident II.

== Background ==
During the 1950s and early 1960s, the United Kingdom's nuclear deterrent was based on the RAF's V-bombers. But in the early 1960s developments in radar and surface-to-air missiles made it clear that bombers were becoming vulnerable, and would be unlikely to penetrate Soviet airspace. Free-fall nuclear weapons would no longer be a credible deterrent.

To address this problem, in May 1960 the British Prime Minister, Harold Macmillan arranged a deal with US President Eisenhower to equip the V bombers with the US-designed AGM-48 Skybolt. The Skybolt was a 1,000-mile (1,600 km) range ballistic missile that allowed the launching bombers to remain well away from Soviet defences and launch attacks that would be basically invulnerable. With this range, the V bombers would have to fly only a few hundred miles from their bases before being in range for an attack on Moscow.

Under the agreement the UK's contribution to the programme was limited to developing suitable mounting points on the Avro Vulcan bomber, installing the required guidance systems that fed the missiles updated positioning information, and development of a British version of the US W47 warhead to arm it, the RE.179 "Skybolt".

=== The Skybolt crisis ===
The incoming Kennedy administration expressed serious doubts of both Skybolt and the US deterrent force in general. Robert McNamara was highly critical of the US bomber fleet, which he saw as obsolete in an age of ICBMs. Skybolt was seen simply as a means of continuing the existence of a system he no longer considered credible, and given the rapidly improving capabilities of ICBM inertial guidance systems, a precision strike capability with free-fall bombs would no longer be needed. McNamara was equally concerned about the UK also having its own nuclear force, and worried that the US could be drawn into a war by the UK. He wanted to bring the UK into a dual-key arrangement.

McNamara first broached the idea of cancelling Skybolt with the British in November 1962. When this was reported in the House of Commons, a storm of protest broke out. A meeting was arranged to settle the issue, and Macmillan stated in no uncertain terms that the UK would be retaining their independent deterrent capability, no matter what the cost. With development of their Polaris-derived warheads well along, a suitable launch platform would be developed, if need be.

Faced with a clear failure in policy terms, Kennedy gave up on the idea of strong-arming Britain into accepting a dual-key arrangement. By the end of the series of meetings, the UK had gained the much more impressive Polaris system, and would start development of a new submarine to launch it. The SSBNs would then take over the nuclear deterrent role from the RAF's V bombers from 1968 onwards.

== Construction ==
Two pairs of the boats were ordered in May 1963 from Vickers Shipbuilding Ltd, Barrow in Furness and from Cammell Laird and Co. Ltd, Birkenhead. The option of buying a fifth unit, planned as Ramillies,^{[a]} was cancelled in February 1965 as a cost-savings measure by the government of Prime Minister Harold Wilson. Traditional battleship names were used, signifying that they were the capital ships of their time.

Vickers Armstrong in Barrow-in-Furness constructed Resolution and Repulse and Cammell Laird in Birkenhead constructed Renown and Revenge. The construction was unusual in that the bow and stern were constructed separately before being assembled together with the American-designed missile compartment.

The design was a modification of the Valiant-class fleet submarine, but greatly extended to incorporate the missile compartment between the fin and the nuclear reactor. The length was 130 metres (430 ft), breadth 10.1 metres (33 ft), height 9 metres (30 ft) and the displacement 8,400 long tons (8,500 t) submerged and 7,600 long tons (7,700 t) surfaced. A Rolls-Royce pressurised water reactor (PWR1) and English Electric Company turbines gave them a speed of 25 knots (46 km/h) and they could dive to depths of 275 metres (902 ft). Sixteen Polaris A3 missiles were carried, in two rows of eight. For emergencies there was a diesel generator and six 533-millimetre (21 in) torpedo tubes located at the bow, firing the Tigerfish wire-guided homing torpedoes. The submarines put to sea with a crew of 143.

According to former head of the Royal Corps of Naval Constructors R.J. Daniel, the Resolution-class SSBNs possessed five features that were envied by the United States Navy: the machinery loading hatch, automated hovering system, welded hull valves, standardised valves, and raft-mounted propulsion machinery.

== Boats in class ==
Pennant	Name	(a) Hull builder (b) Main machinery manufacturers	Ordered	Laid down	Launched	Accepted into service	Commissioned	Decommissioned	Estimated building cost
S22	Resolution	(a) Vickers Ltd, Shipbuilding Group, Barrow-in-Furness (b) Vickers Ltd, Engineering Group, Barrow-in-Furness (b) English Electric Co Ltd (turbines) (b) Rolls-Royce and Associates Ltd.	8 May 1963	26 February 1964	15 September 1966	October 1967	2 October 1967	22 October 1994	£40.24 million (equivalent to £614.8 million in 2025)
S23	Repulse	(a) Vickers Ltd, Shipbuilding Group, Barrow-in-Furness (b) Vickers Ltd, Engineering Group, Barrow-in-Furness (b) English Electric Co Ltd (turbines).	8 May 1963	12 March 1965	4 November 1967	October 1968	28 September 1968	28 August 1996	£37.5 million (equivalent to £544.88 million in 2025)
S26	Renown	(a) Cammell Laird & Co (Shipbuilders and Engineers) Ltd, Birkenhead (b) Vickers Ltd, Engineering Group, Barrow-in-Furness (b) English Electric Co Ltd (turbines).	8 May 1963	25 June 1964	25 February 1967	December 1968	15 November 1968	24 February 1996	£39.95 million (equivalent to £580.47 million in 2025)
S27	Revenge	(a) Cammell Laird & Co (Shipbuilders and Engineers) Ltd, Birkenhead (b) Vickers Ltd, Engineering Group, Barrow-in-Furness (b) English Electric Co Ltd (turbines).	8 May 1963	19 May 1965	15 March 1968	December 1969	4 December 1969	May 1992	£38.6 million (equivalent to £529.43 million in 2025)
	Ramillies (Note: In the book Silent Deep, Peter Hennessy describes discussion of the R names and states that Royal Sovereign and not Ramillies was the name chosen for the planned fifth boat.)			Cancelled 1965.					

== Operational service ==
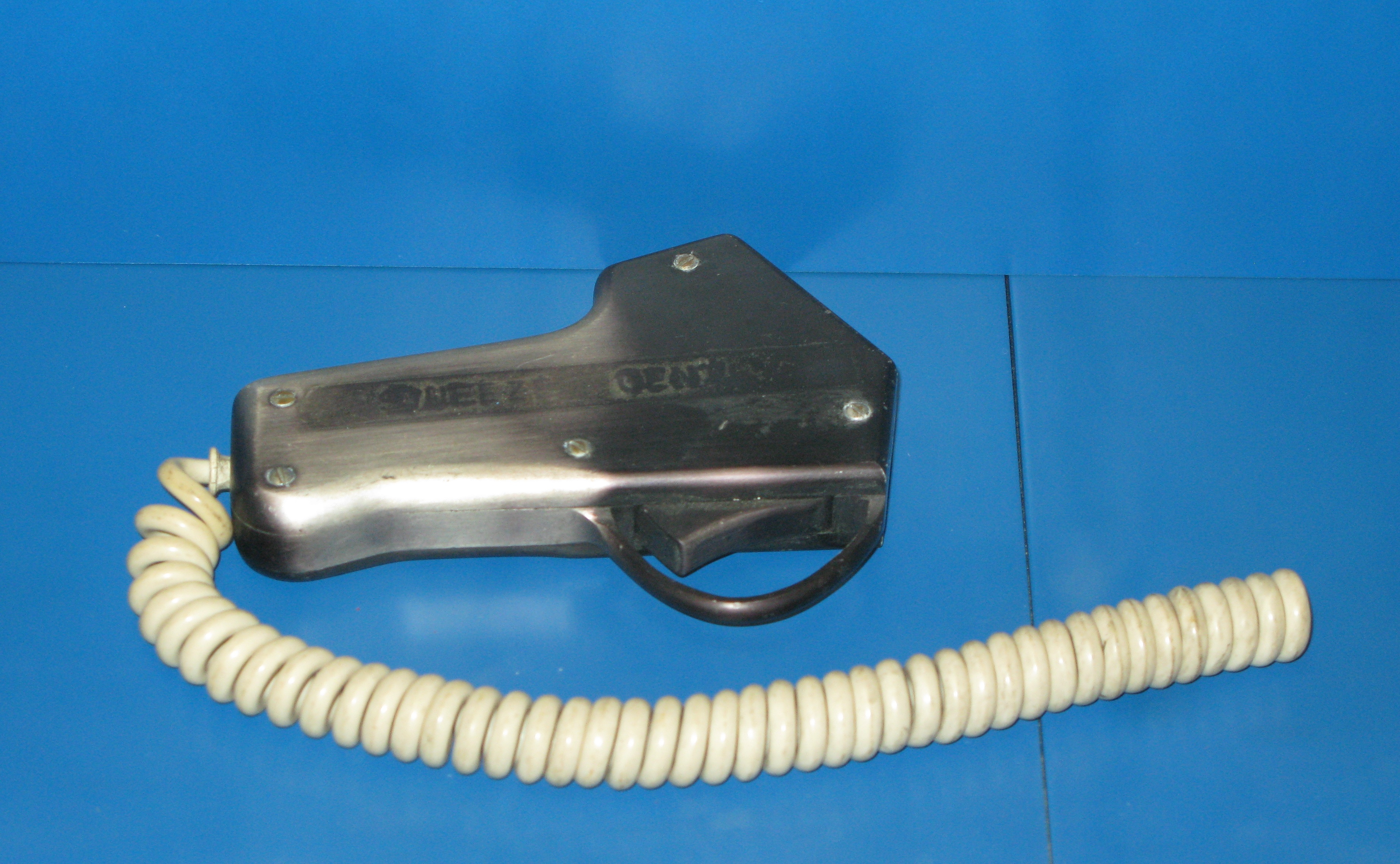
A training trigger for the Polaris missile system

The first to be completed was Resolution, laid down in February 1964 and launched in September 1966. After commissioning in 1967 she underwent a long period of sea trials, culminating in the test firing of a Polaris missile from the USAF Eastern Test Range off Cape Kennedy at 11:15 on 15 February 1968. Resolution commenced her first operational patrol on 15 June 1968, beginning 28 years of Polaris patrols. The class were part of the 10th Submarine Squadron, all based at Faslane Naval Base, Scotland.

All four of the class underwent conversion during the 1980s so that they could be fitted with the Polaris A3TK missile which was fitted with the British-developed Chevaline MRV system.

=== Refits ===
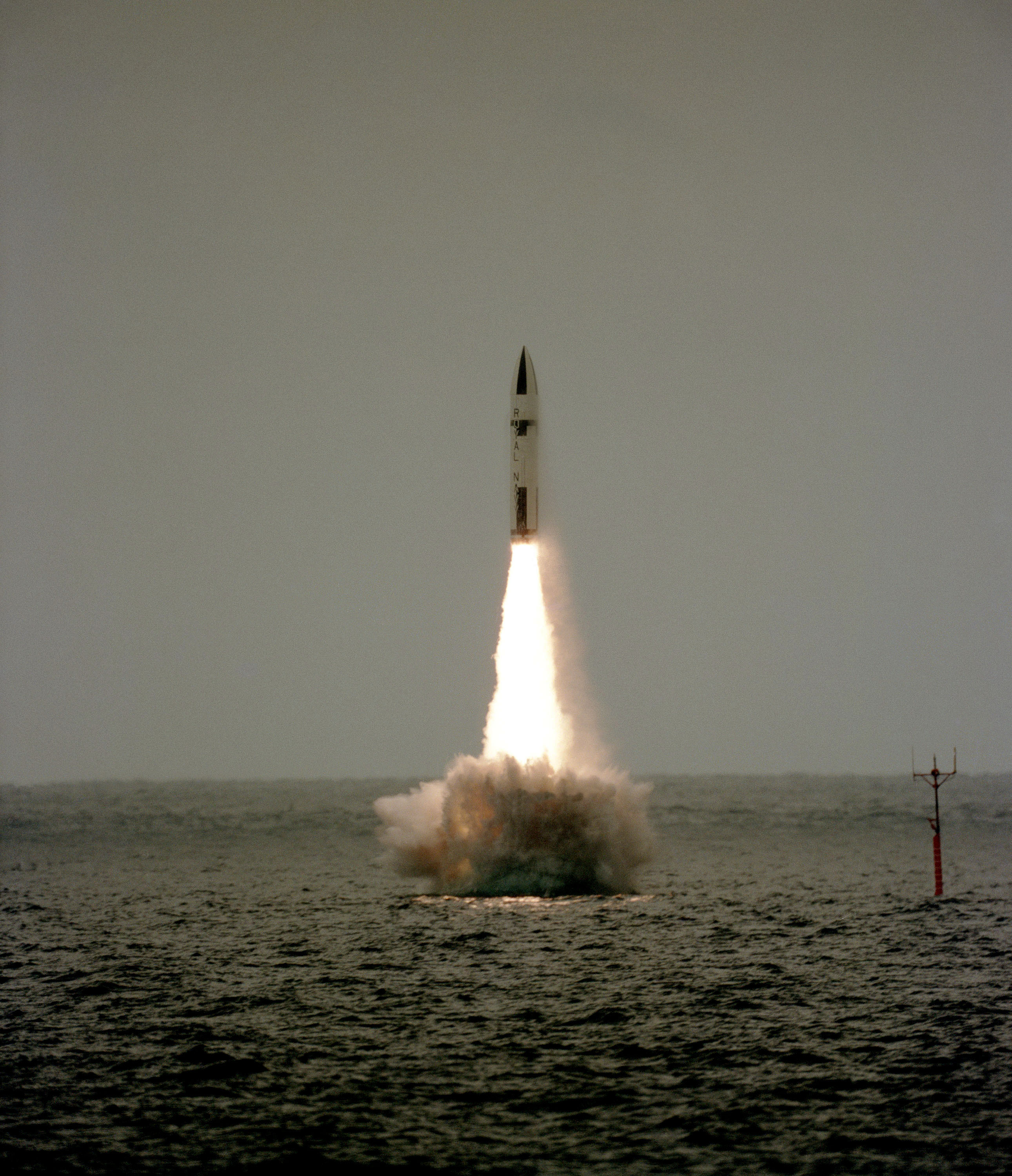
Polaris missile launch from HMS Revenge in 1983.

New methods of project management were used in the refits of the Resolution class, including:

- "The appointment of a senior officer of two star rank and with the title of Assistant Controller (Polaris), working under the joint superintendence of the Controller of the Navy and Chief of Fleet Support, whose responsibilities will include the oversight of the preparations for refits of Polaris boats, and their completion;"
- "The delegation to a designated officer (Director, Project Technical Submarines) of the responsibility for drawing up the "work package" for each refit, which will include full design information and documentation;"
- "The use of a fully integrated refit management team at Rosyth, and"
- "The full use of available management techniques and aids, including computers."

=== Disposal ===
As the newer Vanguard-class submarines entered service, the Resolution class was eventually retired and all boats laid up at Rosyth dockyard with their used nuclear fuel removed. All four will eventually be disposed of via MOD's Submarine Dismantling Project (SDP). This project will begin in 2016 with the attack submarine HMS Swiftsure serving as the proof of concept for the project. The selected method will first remove all Low-level radioactive waste from the vessel, followed by the more radioactive intermediate-level waste. All non-radioactive material in the remainder of the vessel will be recycled for re-use by conventional ship-breaking techniques. Once these procedures have been proven through the disposal of Swiftsure, the remainder of the UK's withdrawn nuclear submarines, including the Resolution-class boats, will be disposed of in this way.

== See also ==
- List of submarines of the Royal Navy
