= HMS Ramillies =

Five ships of the Royal Navy have been named HMS Ramillies after the Battle of Ramillies (23 May 1706):

- HMS Ramillies was 82-gun second rate launched in 1664 as HMS Royal Katherine. She was renamed HMS Ramillies in 1706, and was rebuilt between 1733 and 1741, before finally being wrecked in 1760.
- HMS Ramillies (1763) was a 74-gun third rate launched in 1763. She was damaged in a storm in 1782 and was subsequently burnt.
- HMS Ramillies (1785) was a 74-gun third rate launched in 1785. She was placed on harbour service in 1831 and was broken up in 1850.
- HMS Ramillies (1892) was a Royal Sovereign-class battleship launched in 1892 and scrapped in 1913.
- HMS Ramillies (07) was a Revenge-class battleship launched in 1916. She was placed on harbour service from 1945 and was scrapped in 1948.
- HMS Ramillies was to have been a Resolution-class submarine ordered in 1964, but cancelled in 1965.

== Battle honours ==
Ships named Ramillies have earned the following battle honours:

- Glorious First of June, 1794
- Copenhagen, 1801
- Spartivento, 1940
- Mediterranean, 1940
- Atlantic, 1941
- Diego Suarez, 1942
- Normandy, 1944
- South France, 1944
