= HMS Dreadnought =

Several ships and one submarine of the Royal Navy have borne the name HMS Dreadnought in the expectation that they would "dread nought", i.e. "fear nothing". The 1906 ship, which revolutionized battleship design, became one of the Royal Navy's most famous vessels; battleships built after her were referred to as "dreadnoughts", and earlier battleships became known as pre-dreadnoughts.

- English ship Dreadnought (1553) was a 40-gun ship built in 1553.
- English ship Dreadnought (1573) was a 41-gun ship launched in 1573, rebuilt in 1592 and 1614, then broken up in 1648.
- HMS Dreadnought (1660) was a 52-gun third-rate ship of the line launched in 1654 as the Torrington for the Commonwealth of England Navy, renamed Dreadnought at the Restoration in 1660, and lost in 1690.
- HMS Dreadnought (1691) was a 60-gun fourth-rate ship of the line launched in 1691, rebuilt in 1706 and broken up 1748.
- HMS Dreadnought (1723) was a 60-gun ship of the line built at Portsmouth
- HMS Dreadnought (1742) was a 60-gun fourth rate launched in 1742 and sold 1784.
- HMS Dreadnought (1801) was a 98-gun second rate launched in 1801, converted to a hospital ship in 1827, and broken up 1857.
- HMS Dreadnought (1856) was a hospital ship, formerly HMS Caledonia.
- HMS Dreadnought (1875) was a battleship launched in 1875 and hulked in 1903, then sold in 1908.
- HMS Dreadnought (1906) was a revolutionary battleship, launched in 1906 and sold for breakup in 1921.
- HMS Dreadnought (S101) was the UK's first nuclear-powered submarine, launched in 1960 and decommissioned in 1980.
- HMS Dreadnought (Dreadnought-class submarine) will be the first of the UK's new Dreadnought-class ballistic missile submarines.

== Battle honours ==
- Armada, 1588
- Cadiz, 1596
- Lowestoft, 1665
- Four Days' Battle, 1666
- Orfordness, 1666
- Sole Bay, 1672
- Schooneveld, 1673
- Texel, 1673
- Barfleur, 1692
- Passero, 1718
- Cape Francois, 1757
- Trafalgar, 1805

== See also ==
- Dreadnought was a gunboat that the garrison at Gibraltar launched in June 1782 during the Great Siege of Gibraltar. She was one of 12. Each was armed with an 18-pounder gun, and received a crew of 21 men drawn from Royal Navy vessels stationed at Gibraltar. Brilliant provided Dreadnought's crew.
- Dreadnought was a gunboat operating in North American waters in 1813. On 6 November 1813 she captured the schooners Polly and Cyrus.
