= HMS Repulse (S23) =

1968 Resolution-class nuclear-powered ballistic missile submarine of the Royal Navy

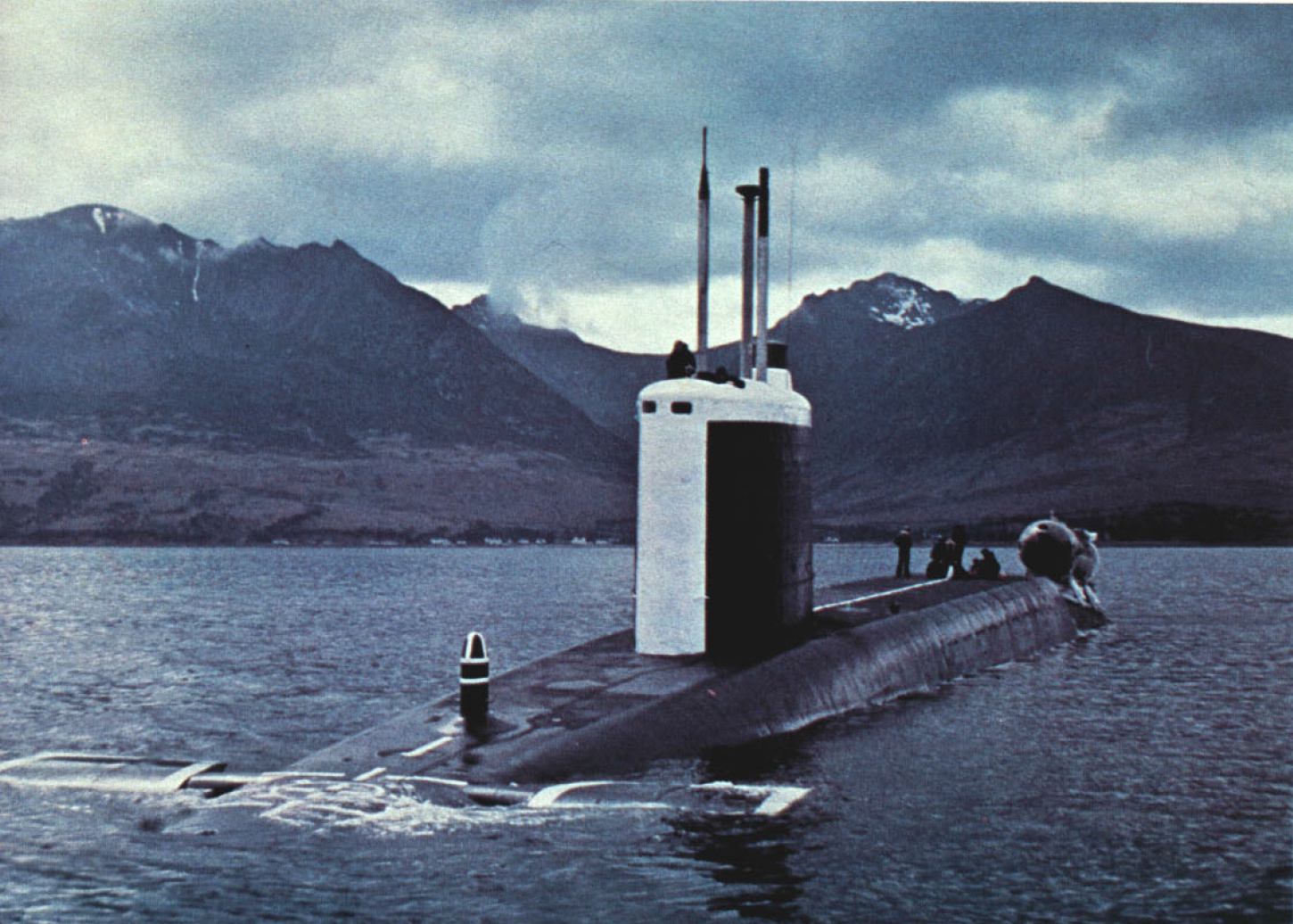
- HMS Repulse in the Firth of Clyde circa 1979

History

United Kingdom
- Name: HMS Repulse
- Ordered: May 1963
- Builder: Vickers Shipbuilding Ltd, Barrow-in-Furness
- Laid down: 12 March 1965
- Launched: 4 November 1967
- Commissioned: 28 September 1968
- Decommissioned: 28 August 1996
- Status: Stored at Rosyth, awaiting disposal
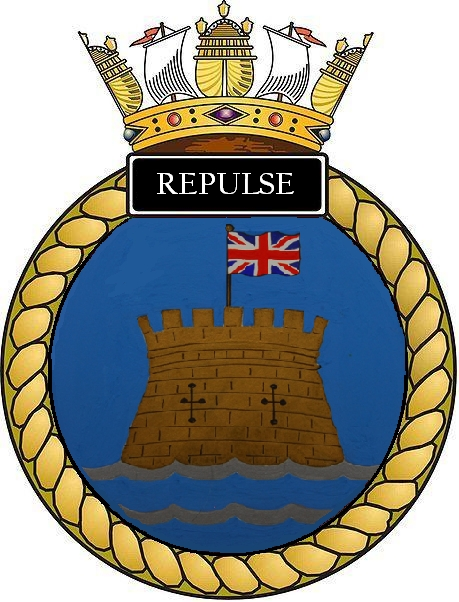
- Badge

General characteristics
- Class & type: Resolution-class ballistic missile submarine
- Displacement: surfaced 7,500 tons; submerged 8,400 tons.
- Length: 425 ft (130 m)
- Beam: 33 ft (10 m)
- Draught: 30 ft 1 in (9.17 m)
- Installed power: 27,500 shp (20,500 kW)
- Propulsion: 1 × Vickers/Rolls-Royce PWR.1 pressurised-water nuclear reactor, Propeller.
- Speed: surface - 20 kn (37 km/h); submerged - 25 kn (46 km/h)
- Range: Unlimited except by food supplies
- Complement: 143 per crew (two crews port and starboard)

HMS Repulse (S23) was a Resolution-class ballistic-missile submarine of the Royal Navy.

== History ==
HMS Repulse was one of two Resolution-class ballistic-missile submarines ordered from Vickers-Armstrongs on 8 May 1963, with a further two ordered from Cammell Laird the same day. Repulse was laid down at Vickers Armstrongs' Barrow-in-Furness shipyard on 12 March 1965 and was launched on 4 November 1967, She was launched by Lady Joan Zuckerman, who was the wife of the chief scientific advisor. Repulse ran aground in the Walney Channel during the launch, although she was undamaged and successfully floated off on the next high tide. She commissioned on 28 September 1968. While she was planned to be the third of her class, delays with the build of HMS Renown at Cammell Laird's Birkenhead shipyard meant that Repulse overtook Renown and was commissioned second of class. She was the last of her class remaining in service with the navy, decommissioned in 1996.

On 10 October 1988, while moored at HMNB Clyde, a trio of antinuclear campaigners managed to reach the submarine’s control room before being arrested.

== Appearances in media ==
HMS Repulse was joined by a BBC film crew for a deployment in 1984. The crew documented the effect of the 8-week-long deployment on both the crew and family members on land. The program was broadcast on BBC One in February 1985, as part of a six-film series documenting the Royal Navy Submarine Service.
