= HMS Revenge (S27) =

1969 Resolution-class nuclear-powered ballistic missile submarine of the Royal Navy

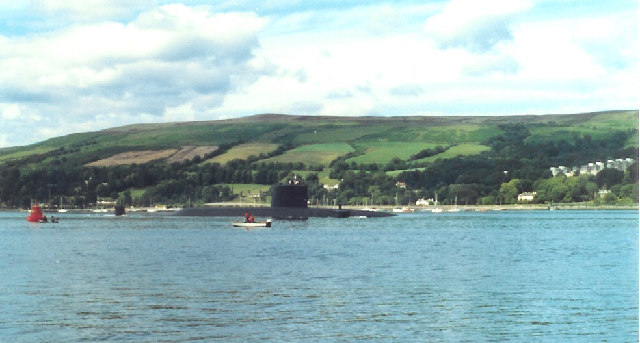
- HMS Revenge transits the Rhu Narrows as she departs the Gareloch in May 1982

History

United Kingdom
- Name: HMS Revenge
- Builder: Cammell Laird, Birkenhead
- Laid down: 19 May 1965
- Launched: 15 March 1968
- Commissioned: 4 December 1969
- Decommissioned: May 1992
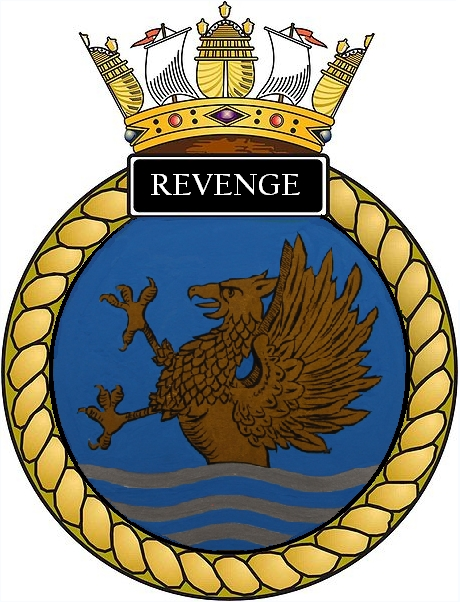
- Badge

General characteristics
- Class & type: Resolution-class ballistic missile submarine
- Displacement: surfaced 7,500 tons; submerged 8,400 tons.
- Length: 425 ft (130 m)
- Beam: 33 ft (10 m)
- Draught: 30 ft 1 in (9.17 m)
- Propulsion: 1 × Vickers/Rolls-Royce PWR.1 pressurised-water nuclear reactor, 27,500 shp (20,500 kW); Propeller.
- Speed: surface - 20 kn (37 km/h); submerged - 25 kn (46 km/h)
- Range: Unlimited except by food supplies
- Complement: 143 (two crews)

HMS Revenge (S27) was the fourth of the Royal Navy's Resolution-class ballistic missile submarines.

== Construction ==
The four Resolution-class submarines were ordered on 8 May 1963, with Revenge, (Note: At first it was planned to name the first of the class Revenge, but this name was seen by politicians, including Lord Jellicoe, First Lord of the Admiralty, as controversial, with Revenge suggesting "that deterrence would have failed". The name was re-allocated to the fourth of class, it being hoped that the controversy associated with the Polaris programme would have reduced by the time the submarine was launched.) the fourth of the class, laid down at Cammell Laird's Birkenhead shipyard on 19 May 1965. Construction of the two submarines being built at Lairds (Revenge and Renown) was much slower than planned, with poor performance by Cammell Laird and in particular its workers to blame. At one stage the Ministry of Defence considered towing the unfinished submarines to Barrow-in-Furness for completion by Vickers-ArmstrongsIn is noted that Barrow supplied Larids with the parts for fitting how ever if parts failed on a barrow boat, Lairds would have to wait for new parts to arrive at Barrow. (Note: The two submarines were known as "Gravy boats" by the workforce as they were seen as "easy money".) Revenge was launched on 15 March 1968. She was formally commissioned on 4 December 1969.

== Design ==
Revenge was 425 feet (129.5 m) long overall and 360 feet (109.7 m) between perpendiculars, with a beam of 33 feet (10.1 m) and a draught of 30 feet (9.1 m). Displacement was 7,500 long tons (7,600 t) surfaced and 8,500 long tons (8,600 t) submerged. A PWR1 pressurised water reactor, designed and built by Rolls-Royce fed steam to geared steam turbines, with the machinery rated at 15,000 shaft horsepower (11,000 kW), giving a speed of 25 knots (29 mph; 46 km/h) submerged and 20 knots (23 mph; 37 km/h) surfaced. A 4,000 brake horsepower (3,000 kW) diesel engine provided auxiliary power.

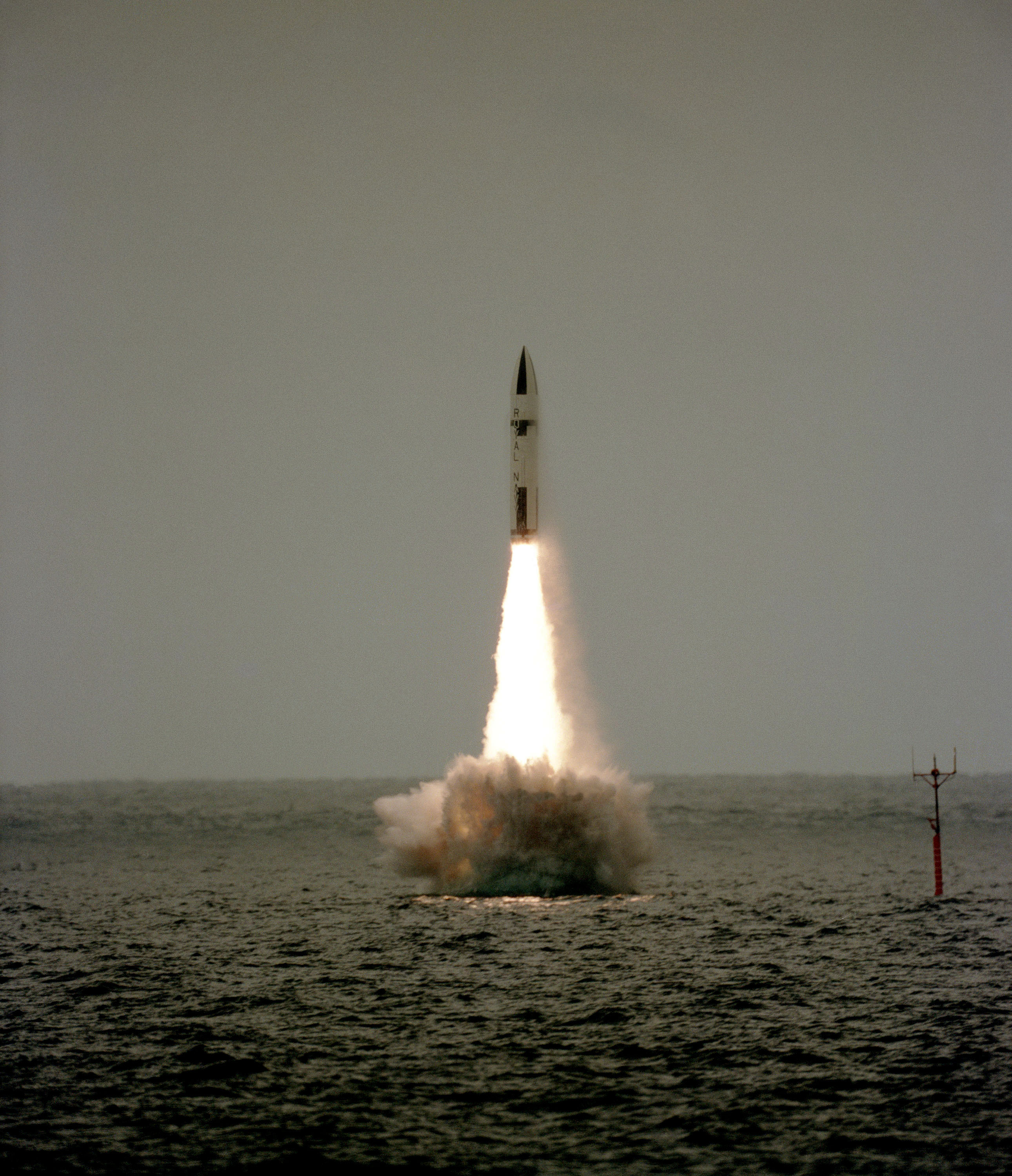
Polaris missile launch from HMS Revenge in 1983

Sixteen tubes for Polaris A3 Submarine-launched ballistic missiles were carried, in two rows of eight. The missiles had a range of 2,500 nautical miles (2,900 mi; 4,600 km), and each missile could carry three 200 kt (840 TJ) nuclear warheads. Defensive armament consisted of six 533-millimetre (21 in) torpedo tubes. The ship had a complement of 143 (13 officers and 130 other ranks), with two separate crews in order to maximise time at sea.

== Service ==
Following commissioning, Revenge underwent extensive sea trials and work-up, before sailing to the United States to carry out a test firing of a Polaris missile at the Eastern Test Range off Florida in June 1970.

She was marked for disposal in 1992. She is currently being stored pending the identification of a disposal solution for all of the UK's decommissioned nuclear submarines, at Rosyth Dockyard, on the northern shore of the Firth of Forth. She is docked down for maintenance and re-preservation approximately every 12 years.

== Sources ==
- Blackman, Raymond V.B. (1971). Jane's Fighting Ships 1971–72. London: Sampson Low, Marston & Co., Ltd. ISBN 0-354-00096-9.
- Gardiner, Robert; Chumbley, Stephen, eds. (1995). Conway's All The World's Fighting Ships 1947–1995. Annapolis, Maryland, USA: Naval Institute Press. ISBN 1-55750-132-7.
- Hennessey, Peter; Jinks, James (2016). The Silent Deep: The Royal Navy Submarine Service since 1945. Penguin Books. ISBN 978-0-241-95948-0.
- Moore, John, ed. (1979). Jane's Fighting Ships 1979–1980. London: Jane's Yearbooks. ISBN 0-354-00587-1.
- Pretty, Ronald T., ed. (1977). Jane's Weapon Systems 1977. London: Jane's Yearbooks. ISBN 0-354-00541-3.
