= HMS Resolution (S22) =

1967 Resolution-class nuclear-powered ballistic missile submarine of the Royal Navy

History

United Kingdom
- Name: HMS Resolution
- Ordered: May 1963
- Builder: Vickers Shipbuilding Ltd, Barrow-in-Furness
- Laid down: 26 February 1964
- Launched: 15 September 1966
- Commissioned: 2 October 1967
- Decommissioned: 22 October 1994
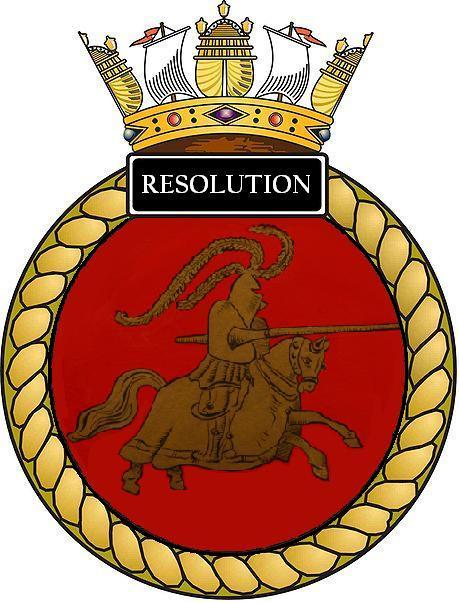
- Badge

General characteristics
- Class & type: Resolution-class ballistic missile submarine
- Displacement: surfaced 7,500 tons; submerged 8,400 tons.
- Length: 425 ft (130 m)
- Beam: 33 ft (10 m)
- Draught: 30 ft 1 in (9.17 m)
- Propulsion: 1 × Vickers/Rolls-Royce PWR.1 pressurised-water nuclear reactor, 27,500 shp (20,500 kW); Propeller.
- Speed: surface: 20 kn (37 km/h); submerged: 25 kn (46 km/h)
- Range: Unlimited except by food supplies
- Complement: 143 (two crews)

HMS Resolution (S22) was the first of the Royal Navy's Resolution-class ballistic missile submarines. She operated from 1968 until 1994 providing the UK Polaris at sea nuclear deterrent.

== Construction ==
The submarine was ordered on 21 May 1963 with Vickers Armstrong at a cost of £40.2m.

The keel was laid down at Barrow-in-Furness on 26 February 1964 under Rowland Baker as Director of the Polaris Executive, within the organisation of Director General Ships, Sir Alfred Sims.

She was launched was on 15 September 1966, attended by Queen Elizabeth the Queen Mother. After fitting out, she proceeded to sea on 22 June 1967. The submarine was commissioned on 2 October 1967, and following extensive trials, including the firing of her first Polaris missile on 15 February 1968, commenced her first patrol on 14 June 1968. To ensure continuous operation, she was the first Royal Navy submarine to operate with two dedicated crews, who would relieve each other, known as port and starboard respectively.

== Service ==
The ship was assigned to the 10th Submarine Squadron (United Kingdom) where it operated as the first of the UKs new Polaris based nuclear deterrent.

Her Polaris system was updated in 1984 with the Chevaline IFE (Improved Front End) that included two new warheads and re-entry bodies and penaids, super-hardened to resist ABM attack, replacing the original three ET.317 warheads.

Resolution conducted the longest patrol of any Polaris submarine being at sea for 108 days in 1991.

=== Alleged use during the Falklands War ===
During the early stages of the Falklands War, the BBC World News reported that Resolution was stationed off Buenos Aires. A similar story appeared in 1984 in the New Statesman which alleged that Resolution was sent south, as a means of launching a nuclear attack against Córdoba in the event that a Royal Navy aircraft carrier be sunk.

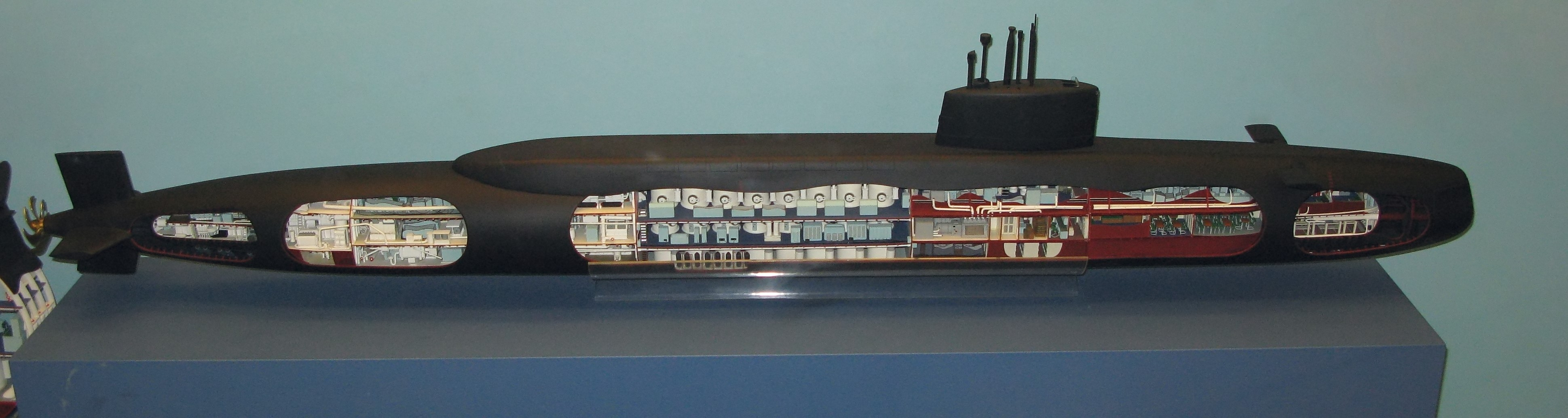
A cutaway model of HMS Resolution

In reality, Resolution's crew were having to deal with an upsurge of Soviet SSN activity, with Resolution having to take evasive action to avoid a November-class submarine. Despite Soviet efforts, Resolution was never found during her 72-day patrol.

== Decommission ==
Following the completion of the first Trident-carrying Vanguard-class submarine in 1992, the Resolution class were gradually removed from service. Resolution was decommissioned on 22 October 1994, after 69 patrols, and laid up at the Rosyth Dockyard. She remains in the main basin at Rosyth, intact but with her reactor defuelled; the MOD has yet to finalise plans for removal of the radioactive reactor parts and the scrapping of the boat.
