= HMS Renown (S26) =

1968 Resolution-class nuclear-powered ballistic missile submarine of the Royal Navy

- center

History

United Kingdom
- Name: HMS Renown
- Builder: Cammell Laird, Birkenhead
- Laid down: 25 June 1964
- Launched: 25 February 1967
- Commissioned: 15 November 1968
- Decommissioned: 24 February 1996
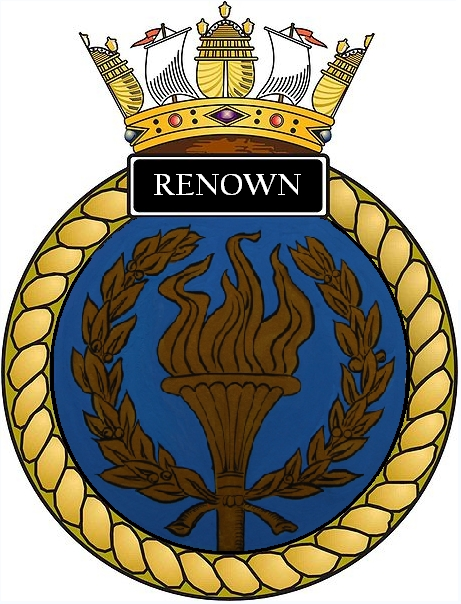
- Badge

General characteristics
- Class & type: Resolution-class ballistic missile submarine
- Displacement: surfaced 7,500 tons; submerged 8,400 tons.
- Length: 425 ft (130 m)
- Beam: 33 ft (10 m)
- Draught: 30 ft 1 in (9.17 m)
- Installed power: 27,500 shp (20,500 kW)
- Propulsion: 1 × Vickers/Rolls-Royce PWR.1 pressurised-water nuclear reactor, Propeller.
- Speed: surface - 20 kn (37 km/h); submerged - 25 kn (46 km/h)
- Range: Unlimited except by food supplies
- Complement: 143 (two crews)

HMS Renown (S26) was the third of the Royal Navy's Resolution-class ballistic missile submarines.

Built by Cammell Laird and launched on 25 February 1967, she was decommissioned in 1996.

== Construction ==
Renown, like the other Resolution-class submarines, was ordered on 8 May 1963 and was laid down at Cammell Laird's Birkenhead shipyard on 25 June 1964. Construction was slower than planned, with poor performance by Cammell Laird and its workforce resulting in both Renown and sister ship Revenge being delayed. In 1966, it was discovered that due to lax interpretation of drawings, Renown's torpedo storage compartment differed in length by 1 inch (2.5 cm) from the lead ship Resolution, and in November that year, broken bits of metal were found in the submarine's primary cooling circuits, the removal of which delayed construction by two months. Renown was launched on 25 February 1967 by Edna Healey, wife of Denis Healey, the Secretary of State for Defence. By October 1967, Revenge was six months behind programme, and the Ministry of Defence considered towing the unfinished Renown and Revenge to Barrow-in-Furness for completion by Vickers-Armstrongs. She was formally commissioned on 15 November 1968.

== Design ==
Renown was 425 feet (129.5 m) long overall and 360 feet (109.7 m) between perpendiculars, with a beam of 33 feet (10.1 m) and a draught of 30 feet (9.1 m).

== Service ==
Renown struck the entrance to a dock when leaving Lairds for sea trials in February 1969, and collided with a merchant ship, MV Moyle in the Irish Sea on 13 October 1969, which resulted in Renown's commanding officer being found guilty of hazarding his submarine at the resulting court-martial and relieved of command. Renown finally became operational in November 1969.

In 1974 Renown suffered structural damage when she struck the bottom of the sea during sea trials off Scotland.

Following a refit Renown carried out test firings of Chevaline, which was a modification of the Polaris missiles to enable them to penetrate Soviet anti-ballistic missile defences, in early 1982, and was fully operational with Chevaline late that year.

In the 1990s the ageing Resolution-class was becoming difficult for the Royal Navy to operate, suffering from an increased number of defects, and Renown was forced to remain alongside at Faslane due to defects in 1995 before being decommissioned on 24 February 1996.

== Bibliography ==
- Blackman, Raymond V.B. (1971). Jane's Fighting Ships 1971–72. London: Sampson Low, Marston & Co., Ltd. ISBN 0-354-00096-9.
- Gardiner, Robert; Chumbley, Stephen, eds. (1995). Conway's All The World's Fighting Ships 1947–1995. Annapolis, Maryland, USA: Naval Institute Press. ISBN 1-55750-132-7.
- Hennessey, Peter; Jinks, James (2016). The Silent Deep: The Royal Navy Submarine Service since 1945. Penguin Books. ISBN 978-0-241-95948-0.
- Moore, John, ed. (1979). Jane's Fighting Ships 1979–1980. London: Jane's Yearbooks. ISBN 0-354-00587-1.
