= HMS Vanguard (S28) =

British nuclear-powered ballistic missile submarine

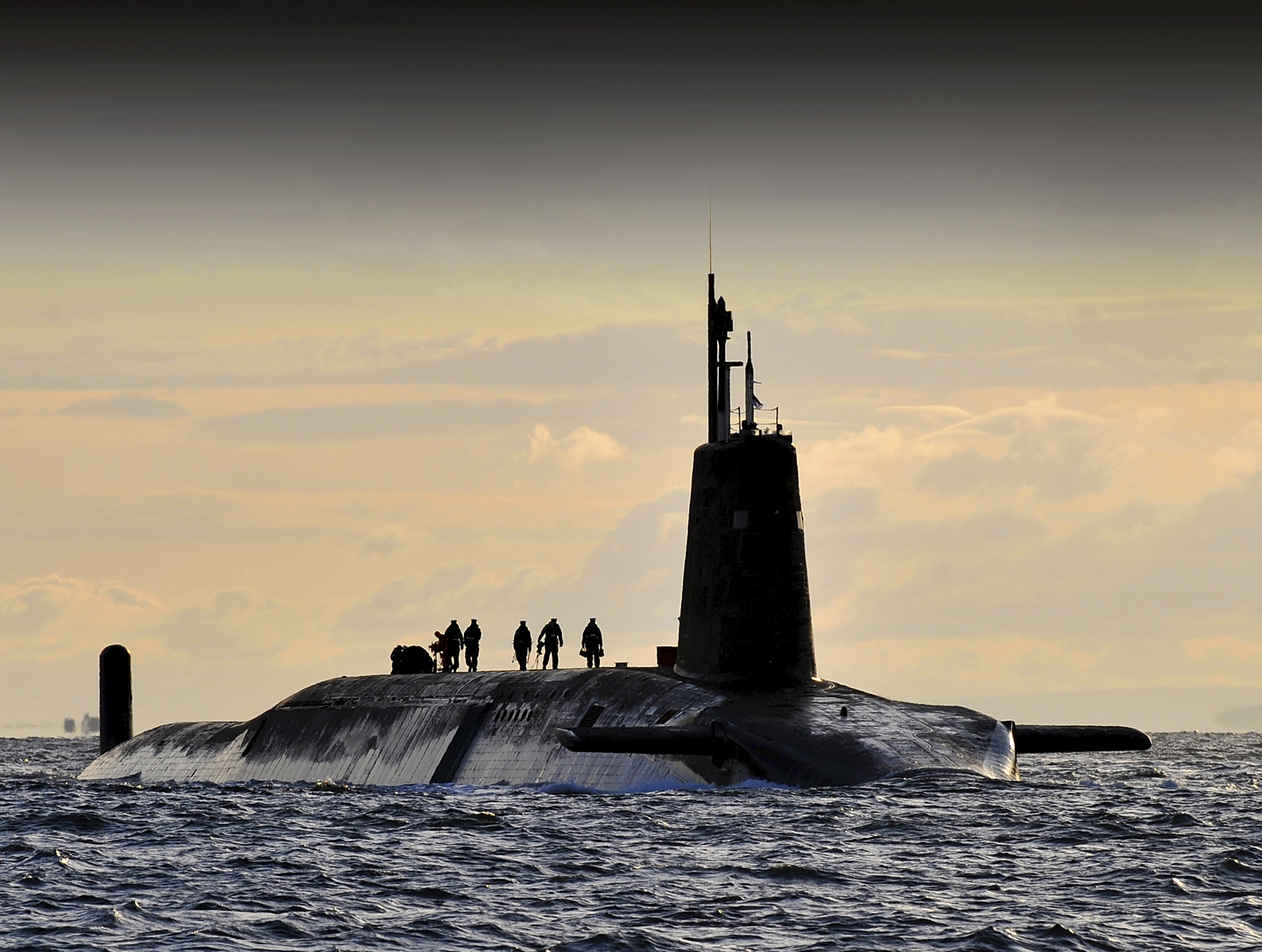
- HMS Vanguard at Faslane

History

United Kingdom
- Name: HMS Vanguard
- Ordered: 30 May 1986
- Builder: Vickers Shipbuilding and Engineering Ltd, Barrow-in-Furness
- Laid down: 3 September 1986
- Launched: 4 March 1992
- Sponsored by: Diana, Princess of Wales
- Commissioned: 14 August 1993
- Home port: HMNB Clyde, Argyll, Scotland
- Status: In active service
- Badge

General characteristics
- Class & type: Vanguard-class submarine
- Displacement: 15,900 tonnes, submerged
- Length: 149.9 m (491 ft 10 in)
- Beam: 12.8 m (42 ft 0 in)
- Draught: 12 m (39 ft 4 in)
- Propulsion: 1 × Rolls-Royce PWR2 nuclear reactor, 2 × GEC turbines; 27,500 shp (20.5 MW); 1 × shaft, pump jet propulsor; 2 × auxiliary retractable propulsion motors; 2 × Allen turbo generators (6 MW); 2 × Paxman diesel alternators; 2,700 shp (2.0 MW)
- Speed: In excess of 25 knots (46 km/h; 29 mph), submerged
- Range: Only limited by food and maintenance requirements.
- Complement: 135
- Sensors & processing systems: BAE Systems SMCS; Kelvin Hughes Type 1007 I-band navigation radar; Thales Underwater Systems Type 2054 composite sonar suite comprising: Marconi/Ferranti Type 2046 towed array sonar; Type 2043 hull-mounted active and passive search sonar; Type 2082 passive intercept and ranging sonar; Pilkington Optronics CK51 search periscope; Pilkington Optronics CH91 attack periscope
- Electronic warfare & decoys: Two SSE Mk10 launchers for Type 2066 and Type 2071 torpedo decoys; RESM Racal UAP passive intercept
- Armament: 4 × 21-inch (533 mm) torpedo tubes for: Spearfish heavyweight torpedoes; 16 × ballistic missile tubes for: Lockheed Trident II D5 SLBMs with up to 12 MIRVed Holbrook Mk-4A (100 kt_{TNT}) nuclear warheads each

The eleventh HMS Vanguard of the Royal Navy is the lead boat of her class of Trident ballistic missile-armed submarines. The submarine is based at Faslane, HMNB Clyde, Argyll, Scotland.

Vanguard was built at Barrow-in-Furness by Vickers Shipbuilding and Engineering Ltd, later BAE Systems Submarine Solutions, was launched on 4 March 1992, and commissioned on 14 August 1993 in the presence of Diana, Princess of Wales.

== Operational history ==
=== Entry into service ===
The submarine's first commanding officer was Captain David Russell and the senior engineer officer, during build, was Commander James Grant OBE.

=== Refit ===
In February 2002, Vanguard began a two-year refit at HMNB Devonport. The refit was completed in June 2004 and in October 2005, Vanguard completed her return to service trials (Demonstration and Shakedown Operations) with the firing of an unarmed Trident missile. During this refit, Vanguard was boarded by a pair of anti-nuclear protesters who spent half an hour on board before being challenged. They were charged with damaging a fence which they cut to access the submarine.

=== Collision between HMS Vanguard and Le Triomphant ===
On the night between 3–4 February 2009, Vanguard collided with the French submarine Le Triomphant in the Atlantic Ocean.

On 6 February 2009, the French Ministry of Defence reported that Le Triomphant "collided with an immersed object (probably a container)" The UK Ministry of Defence initially would not comment that the incident took place. On 16 February 2009, the incident was confirmed by First Sea Lord Sir Jonathon Band, in response to a question at an unrelated event. Band said that the collision occurred at low speed, and that there had been no injuries. The French Ministry of Defence also stated that a collision "at a very low speed" had occurred, with no casualties. At the time of the collision, both vessels were submerged and moving "at very low speed" according to the UK Ministry of Defence. Both are equipped with active and passive sonar, although only the latter is used on an operational patrol.

Both nuclear-powered ballistic missile submarines sustained damage, but no injuries or radioactivity releases were reported. Vanguard received damage to the outer casing in the area of the missile compartment on the starboard (right) side, requiring repairs. Le Triomphant was said to have received damage to the active sonar dome under her bow, indicating that Le Triomphant ran into Vanguard from above and amidship. According to The Daily Telegraph, the cost of repairing the damage to both submarines was expected to amount to up to £50 million (equivalent to about £80M in 2025). Both vessels returned to home bases under their own power, Vanguard to Her Majesty's Naval Base Clyde in the Firth of Clyde on 14 February 2009, and Le Triomphant to Île Longue in Brittany, escorted by a frigate as a normal procedure.

The BBC speculated that though a collision might appear highly improbable considering the vastness of the areas in which SSBNs operate, the actual areas they use are in reality limited, and overlap. They have claimed that the use of these areas by submarines of the British, French and Russian navies has increased the risk of accidental collision. Several media outlets have referred to comments by retired Royal Navy Commodore Stephen Saunders, editor of Janes Fighting Ships, where he described the incident as "very serious" and said it was time for France and Britain to coordinate their submarine operations more actively, suggesting that the use of operating areas is not communicated between France, the UK and the United States or that communication procedures were not effective. "I would have thought it possible to at least arrange to be in different parts of the ocean without compromising operational security," said Saunders. "No doubt there are a number of technical issues to be investigated, but the root of the problem appears to be procedural." This position appears to be corroborated by Admiral Sandy Woodward, a former commander of the Royal Navy's submarine force. In a commentary article for The Independent newspaper, he said that whilst it is not known whether the UK and France exchange information now, it was not the case when he served as Flag Officer Submarines in 1984. He recalls that his French counterpart proposed that London and Paris share information on SSBN patrols, precisely to avoid an incident at sea, but no agreement was reached at the time on achieving that.

With the delayed acknowledgement of the accident, both the British and French ministries of defence were accused of attempting a cover-up of the collision. The delay in reporting the accident was also criticised in the international press. British MP Nick Harvey demanded an official inquiry into the issue. A government spokesman said that there "was no compromise to nuclear safety". Hervé Morin, France's Minister of Defence, said that they "face an extremely simple technological problem, which is that these submarines are not detectable".

=== Overhaul and refueling ===
In January 2012 radiation was detected in the PWR2 test reactor's coolant water, caused by a microscopic breach in fuel cladding. This discovery led to Vanguard being scheduled to be refuelled in its next "deep maintenance period", due to last 3.5 years from 2015, and contingency measures being applied to other Vanguard and Astute-class submarines, at a cost of £270 million. This was not revealed to the public until 2014.

Vanguard eventually returned to active service in July 2022 after spending almost 7 years undergoing refit. On 16 August 2022 Vanguard was rededicated into the Royal Navy in a ceremony held at HMNB Devonport, and on 9 May 2023 she left for sea. The overrun of the maintenance by about four years had a major impact on operations, causing other vessels in the class to have to operate extended-length patrols to maintain Continuous at Sea Deterrent. Consequently the MOD decided against refueling the other submarines of the class.

=== Glued bolts during overhaul ===
In February 2023, the Royal Navy began investigating claims that broken bolts for the reactor chamber on Vanguard had insufficiently been repaired using glue, during her seven year refit. After the heads of several bolts had been sheared off after being over-tightened, workers for defence firm Babcock had allegedly glued the heads on the bolts back on, rather than completely replacing the bolts. The glued bolts held insulation in place on the coolant pipes for the nuclear reactor, and were found shortly prior to activation of the reactor.

Defence Secretary Ben Wallace demanded a meeting and “assurances about future work” after The Sun reported on the issue. Babcock is one of the United Kingdom's largest defence contractors, with contracts for the maintenance of both the Royal Navy's Astute-class and Vanguard-class submarine fleets. The shadow defence secretary, John Healey, remarked that "the Defence Secretary must make sure contractors are delivering maintenance to this critical capability safely, on time and on-budget.".

== See also ==
- Letters of last resort
- List of submarines of the Royal Navy
- List of submarine classes of the Royal Navy
- Nuclear weapons and the United Kingdom
- Royal Navy Submarine Service
- Submarine-launched ballistic missile
- Trident nuclear programme
