= Vulcan Naval Reactor Test Establishment =

UK Ministry of Defence in Scotland

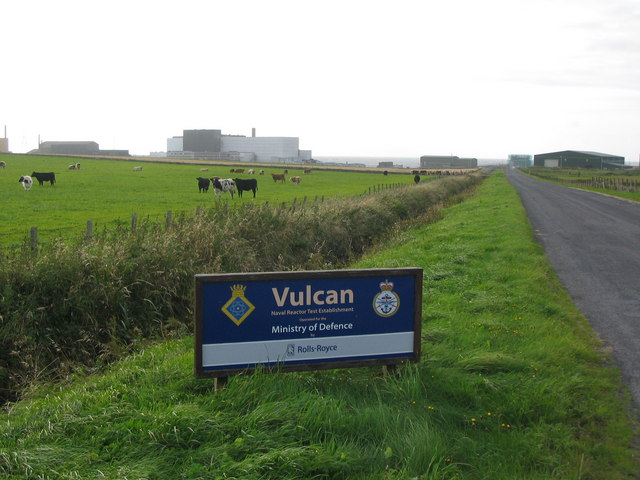
- Entrance road to Vulcan NRTE
- Country: United Kingdom
- Coordinates: 58°34′34.43″N 3°45′27.96″W
- Status: Decommissioning
- Construction began: 1957
- Commission date: 1965
- Owner: Ministry of Defence (United Kingdom)
- Operator: Rolls-Royce Submarines

Vulcan Naval Reactor Test Establishment (NRTE), formerly HMS Vulcan, is a UK Ministry of Defence (MoD) establishment in Scotland, operated by Rolls-Royce Submarines.

The site formerly operated two separate prototype nuclear reactors, trialling five different types of submarine reactor core.

The site is located adjacent to the Dounreay civil nuclear site.

== History ==
When operational, the site housed and operated the prototype nuclear propulsion plants of the type operated by the Royal Navy in its submarine fleet. Originally it was known as the Admiralty Reactor Test Establishment (ARTE).

For over 40 years Vulcan has been the cornerstone of the Royal Navy's nuclear propulsion programme, testing and proving the operation of five generations of reactor core. Its reactors have significantly led the operational submarine plants in terms of operation hours, proving systems, procedures and safety. The reactors were run at higher levels of intensity than those on submarines with the intention of discovering any system problems before they might be encountered on board submarines.

Rolls-Royce, which designs and procures all the reactor plants for the Royal Navy from its Derby offices, operates Vulcan on behalf of the MoD and employs around 280 staff there, led by a small team of staff from the Royal Navy. Reactors developed include the PWR1 and PWR2.

In 2011, the MoD stated that NRTE could be scaled down or closed after 2015 when the current series of tests ends. Computer modelling and confidence in new reactor designs meant testing would no longer be necessary. The cost of decommissioning NRTE facilities when they become redundant, including nuclear waste disposal, was estimated at £2.1 billion in 2005. Its final reactor shut down on 21 July 2015, with post operational work continuing to 2022.

In March 2020, it was reported that tenders were being issued to decontaminate and dismantle the reactor complex under a ten-year contract, ending in the creation of a "brownfield" site, which would be transferred to the Nuclear Decommissioning Authority. This decommissioning programme would start in 2023, following the removal of all fuel to the NDA Sellafield site.

=== Dounreay Submarine Prototype 1 (DSMP1) ===
The first reactor, PWR1, is known as Dounreay Submarine Prototype 1 (DSMP1). The reactor plant was recognised by the Royal Navy as one of Her Majesty's Submarines (HMS) and was commissioned as HMS Vulcan in 1963. It went critical in 1965. HMS Vulcan is a Rolls-Royce PWR 1 reactor plant and tested Cores A, B and Z before being shut down in 1984. In 1987, the plant was re-commissioned as LAIRD (Loss of Coolant Accident Investigation Rig Dounreay) a non-nuclear test rig, the only one of its kind in the world. LAIRD trials simulated loss of coolant accidents to prove the effectiveness of systems designed to protect the reactor in loss-of-coolant accidents.

=== Shore Test Facility (STF) ===
The second reactor, PWR2, is housed in the Shore Test Facility (STF), was commissioned in 1987, and went critical with Core G the same year. The plant was shut down in 1996, and work began to refit the plant with the current core, Core H, in February 1997. This work was completed in 2000 and after two years of safety justification the plant went critical in 2002. Vulcan Trials Operation and Maintenance (VTOM) (the programme under which Core H is tested) was completed and the reactor shut down on 21 July 2015. The reactor was then to be de-fuelled and examined, and post-operational work was to continue to 2022; the site was then to be decommissioned along with facilities at neighbouring UKAEA Dounreay.

In January 2012, radiation was detected in the reactor's coolant water, caused by a microscopic breach in fuel cladding. This discovery led to HMS Vanguard being scheduled to be refuelled and contingency measures being applied to other Vanguard and Astute-class submarines, at a cost of £270 million, before similar problems might arise on the submarines. This was not revealed to the public until 2014.

== See also ==
- Dounreay civil nuclear site, located adjacent to Vulcan NRTE
