= HMS Achilles (S125) =

Astute-class nuclear-powered attack submarine of the Royal Navy

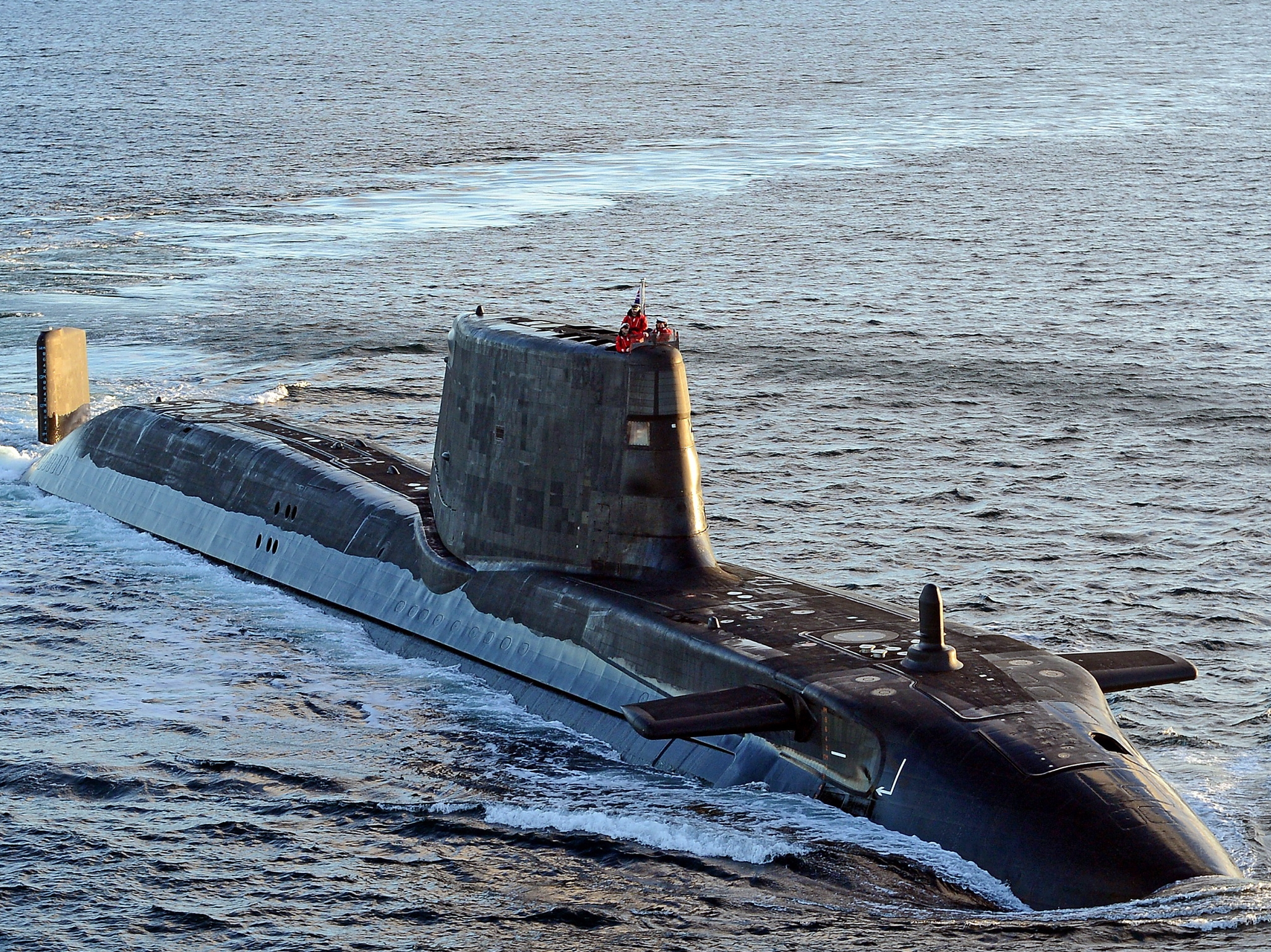
- HMS Ambush, another Astute-class submarine, during sea trials off the coast of Scotland

History

United Kingdom
- Name: HMS Achilles
- Builder: BAE Systems Submarine Solutions
- Cost: £1.640B (budget)
- Laid down: 14 May 2018
- In service: Projected 2028/early 2029
- Identification: Pennant number: S125
- Status: Under construction

General characteristics
- Class & type: Astute-class fleet submarine
- Displacement: Surfaced: 7,000 to 7,400 t (6,900 to 7,300 long tons; 7,700 to 8,200 short tons); Submerged: 7,400 to 7,800 t (7,300 to 7,700 long tons; 8,200 to 8,600 short tons)
- Length: 97 m (318 ft 3 in)
- Beam: 11.3 m (37 ft 1 in)
- Draught: 10 m (32 ft 10 in)
- Propulsion: Rolls-Royce PWR 2 reactor, MTU 600 kilowatt diesel generators
- Speed: 30 kn (56 km/h; 35 mph), submerged
- Range: Unlimited
- Endurance: 90 days
- Test depth: Over 300 m (980 ft)
- Complement: 98 (capacity for 109)
- Sensors & processing systems: Thales Sonar 2076; Atlas DESO 25 echosounder; 2 × Thales CM010 optronic masts; Raytheon Successor IFF
- Armament: 6 × 21 in (533 mm) torpedo tubes with stowage for up to 38 weapons: Tomahawk Block IV cruise missiles; Spearfish heavyweight torpedoes

HMS Achilles is an Astute-class nuclear-powered fleet submarine under construction for the Royal Navy and the seventh in her class. The boat has had its name changed twice, having previously held the in-work name of Ajax and then officially named as Agincourt in 2018

The confirmation for the seventh and final Astute-class boat was given in the Strategic Defence and Security Review 2010, although the order was not placed until 2018.

On 11 December 2012 the British government announced that long-lead items had been ordered for boats 6 and 7.

On 6 March 2018 the Defence Procurement minister Guto Bebb confirmed that the MoD had gained Treasury approval to sign a contract for Astute Boat 7, after a leaked Navy document had suggested it might not be procured as a cost-saving measure. In May 2018 it was reported that construction of Boat Seven had begun. She had been projected as being ready for service by early 2026, to be based at Faslane (HMNB Clyde). However, it was subsequently reported that her in-service date slipped substantially and she is now likely to commission in 2028 or early 2029.

== Design ==
=== Propulsion ===
Achilles' PWR2 nuclear reactor will not need to be refuelled during the boat's 25-year service. Since the submarine can replenish her air supply and purify water underway and while submerged, she will be able to circumnavigate the planet without resurfacing. The submarine's main limitation will be from the three months supply of food carried for the 98 officers and ratings.

=== Weapons ===
Achilles will have provision for up-to 38 weapons in six 21-inch (533 mm) torpedo tubes. The submarine will be capable of using Tomahawk Block IV land-attack missiles with a range of 1,000 miles (1,600 kilometres) and Spearfish heavyweight torpedoes.

== Name ==
Originally the vessel had the in-work name HMS Ajax, and then HMS Agincourt. In January 2025, the government announced she would be named HMS Achilles. It was reported that the change had been requested by the King, amid speculation the original name might cause unnecessary offence to France. The Royal Navy stated that the new name was proposed by the Royal Navy Ships' Names and Badging Committee and subsequently approved by the King.

The name HMS Achilles was explained as marking the 80th anniversary of VE and VJ days. The ship carries six battle honours including Trafalgar as well as River Plate and Okinawa in World War II.

== Construction ==
Construction of Agincourt was delayed by a significant fire in the Devonshire Dock Hall in the early hours of 30 October 2024. In January 2026, the Ministry of Defence stated that the fire had impacted assembly work on the now renamed Achilles as well as HMS Dreadnought. In August 2026, Minister of State for Defence Readiness and Industry Luke Pollard reported that work was underway to recover from the damage, with the vessel remaining in 'an advanced stage of build'.
