= HMS Ambush (S120) =

Astute-class nuclear-powered attack submarine of the Royal Navy

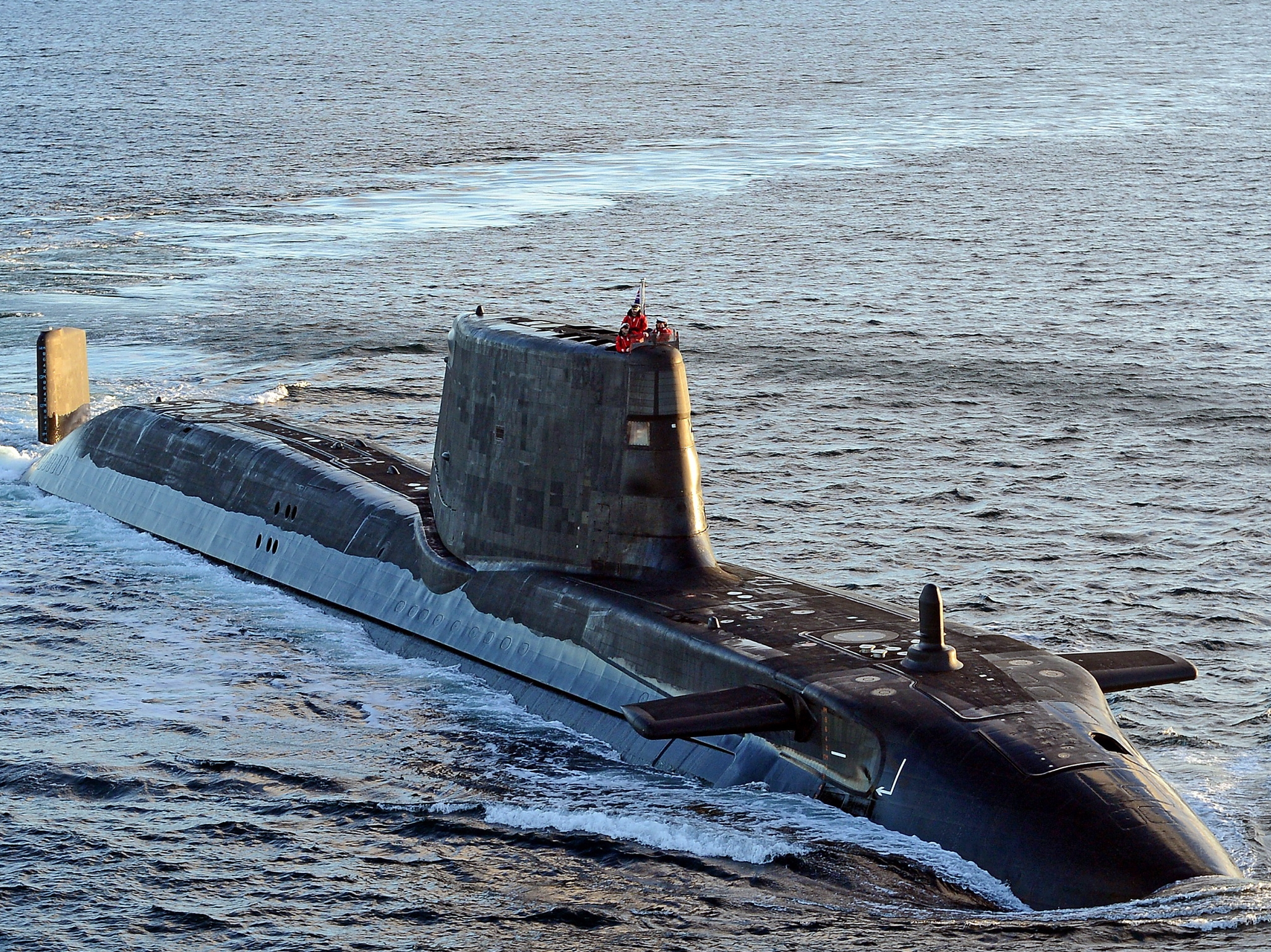
- Ambush on sea trials, December 2012.

History

United Kingdom
- Name: HMS Ambush
- Namesake: Ambush
- Ordered: March 1997
- Builder: BAE Systems Submarine Solutions
- Laid down: 22 October 2003
- Launched: 6 January 2011
- Christened: 16 December 2010
- Commissioned: 1 March 2013
- Home port: HM Naval Base Clyde
- Identification: Pennant number: S120
- Motto: Hide And Seek
- Status: In active service
- Badge

General characteristics
- Class & type: Astute-class fleet submarine
- Displacement: Surfaced: 7,000 to 7,400 t (7,300 long tons; 8,200 short tons); Submerged: 7,400 to 7,800 t (7,700 long tons; 8,600 short tons)
- Length: 97 m (318 ft 3 in)
- Beam: 11.3 m (37 ft 1 in)
- Draught: 10 m (32 ft 10 in)
- Propulsion: 1 × Rolls-Royce PWR 2 nuclear reactor, HEU 93.5%; MTU 600 kilowatt diesel generators
- Speed: 30 kn (56 km/h; 35 mph), submerged
- Range: Unlimited
- Endurance: 90 days
- Test depth: Over 300 m (984 ft 3 in)
- Complement: 98 (capacity for 109)
- Sensors & processing systems: Thales Sonar 2076; Atlas DESO 25 echosounder; 2 × Thales CM010 optronic masts; Raytheon Successor IFF
- Armament: 6 × 21 in (533 mm) torpedo tubes with stowage for up to 38 weapons: Tomahawk Block IV cruise missiles; Spearfish heavyweight torpedoes

HMS Ambush is an Astute-class nuclear-powered attack submarine of the Royal Navy, the second boat of her class.

Ambush is the third vessel, and the second submarine, to bear the name in Royal Naval service. She was ordered in 1997, laid down in 2003 and commissioned in 2013. As of June 2026, it has last been to sea in the autumn of 2022.

== Design ==
=== Propulsion ===
Ambush's nuclear reactor will not need to be refuelled during the boat's 25-year service. Since the submarine can purify water and air, she will be able to circumnavigate the planet without resurfacing. The main limit is that the submarine will only be able to carry three months' supply of food for 98 officers and ratings.

=== Weapons ===
Ambush has provision for up-to 38 weapons in six 21-inch (533 mm) torpedo tubes. The submarine is capable of using Tomahawk Block IV land-attack missiles with a range of 1,000 miles (1,600 kilometres) and Spearfish heavyweight torpedoes.

== Construction and commissioning ==
Ambush was ordered from GEC's Marconi Marine (now BAE Systems Submarine Solutions) on 17 March 1997. She was laid down at Barrow-in-Furness on 22 October 2003, officially named on 16 December 2010, launched on 6 January 2011, completed her initial dive test on 30 September 2011, and departed Barrow for sea trials on 15 September 2012. Ambush was commissioned in a ceremony at HM Naval Base Clyde on 1 March 2013.

== Operational history ==
Following her commissioning, Ambush continued sea trials throughout much of 2013. In May 2013, she carried out berthing trials with forward support ship RFA Diligence and, in August 2013, she successfully conducted her first live torpedo and cruise missile firings.

In October 2014, Ambush completed a maiden deployment to the United States and Brazil, visiting Florida's Port Canaveral along the way and taking part in the centenary celebrations of the Brazilian submarine force. In April 2015, Ambush participated in Exercise Joint Warrior, the largest military exercise held in Europe, alongside 55 other naval ships of NATO navies. She further participated in Exercise Dynamic Manta 15.

=== Collision ===
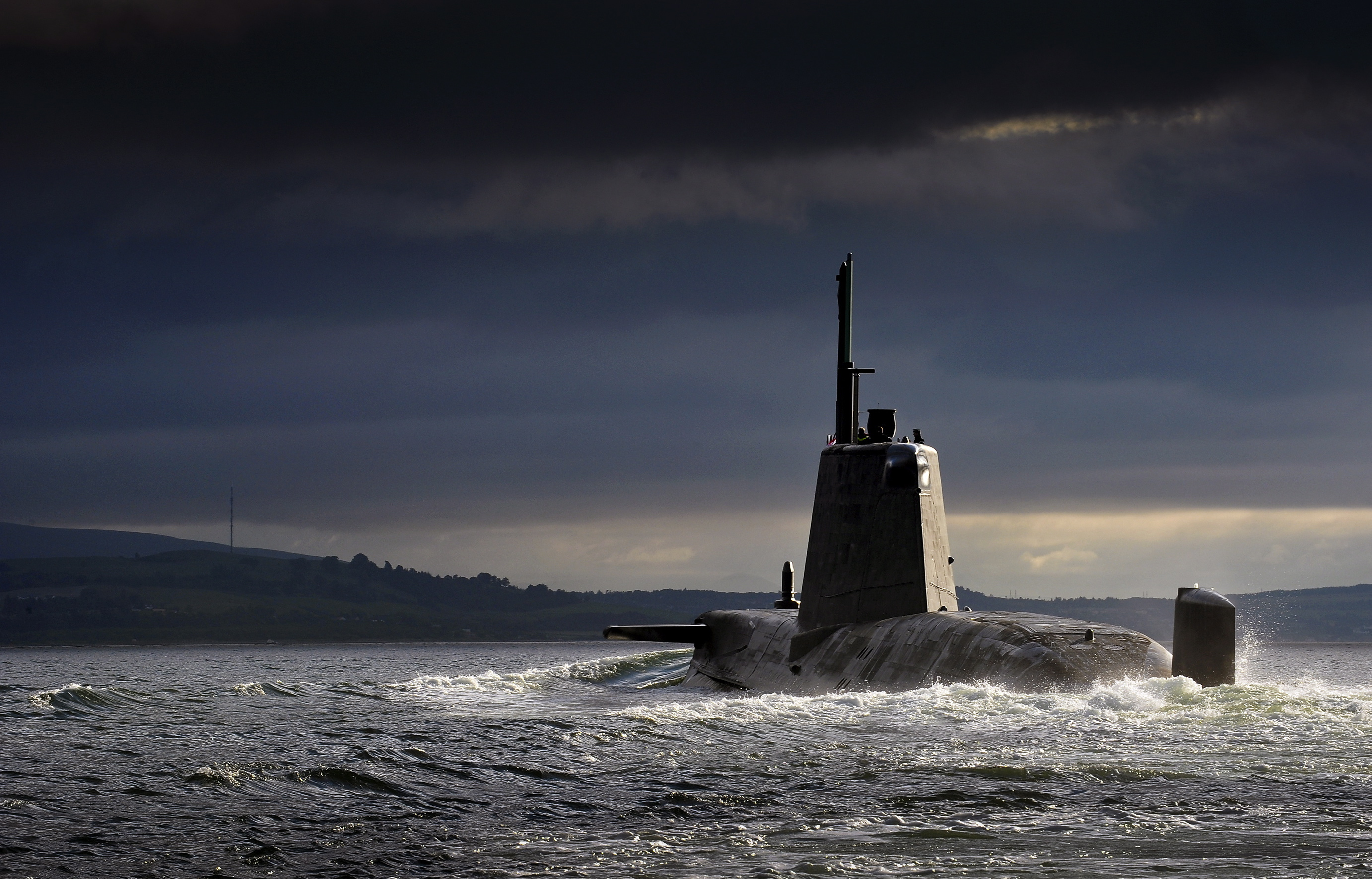
HMS Ambush returning to HMNB Clyde, Scotland

On 20 July 2016, while surfacing on an exercise in the Strait of Gibraltar, Ambush collided with the Panama-flagged merchant ship Andreas, sustaining significant damage to the top of her fin (described as a “conning tower” in some reports) where some of her sonar equipment is housed. It was reported that no crew members were injured during the collision and that the submarine's nuclear reactor section remained completely undamaged. Repairs cost £2.1 million and the commander, who was training a group of students at the time, was sentenced to forfeiting a year of seniority for negligently hazarding the vessel.

As of August 2025, HMS Ambush was reported to be undergoing a period of prolonged maintenance at Faslane, having last been to sea in the autumn of 2022.

== Affiliations ==
Ambush is affiliated to:

- Derby Sea Cadets: The Sea Cadet unit TS Ambush
- Burton Sea Cadets: The Sea Cadet unit TS Modwena
- Newark Sea Cadets: The Sea Cadet unit TS Newark Castle
- The city of Derby
- The Dolphin ward of Royal Derby Hospital
- Bemrose School Derby
- Rolls-Royce Marine Division, Derby
- Royal Naval Association, Derby Submariners' Association, Derby branch
- National Memorial Arboretum
