= SSN-AUKUS-class submarine =

Proposed submarines of the Royal Navy and Royal Australian Navy

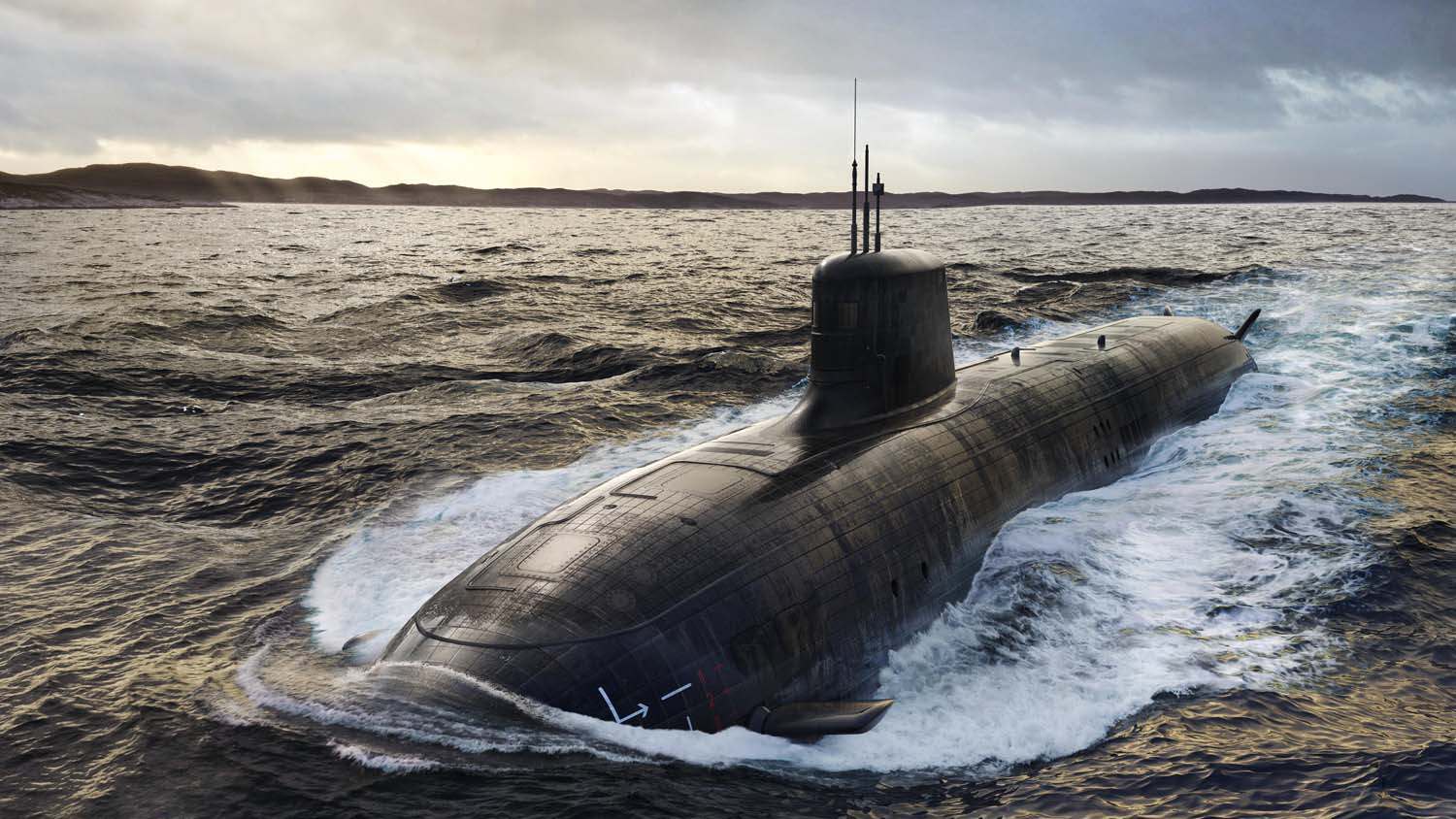
- Rendering of SSN-AUKUS submarine (BAE Systems)

Class overview
- Name: SSN-AUKUS, SSN-A
- Builders: BAE Systems Submarines, Barrow-in-Furness (United Kingdom); ASC and BAE Systems, Osborne Naval Shipyard (Australia)
- Operators: Royal Navy; Royal Australian Navy
- Preceded by: Astute class (RN); Collins class (RAN)
- Built: From 2027 to 2050s (United Kingdom); From late 2030s to 2040s (Australia)
- In service: From late 2030s (United Kingdom); From early 2040s (Australia)
- Planned: Up to 12 (United Kingdom); 5 (Australia)

General characteristics (conceptual)
- Type: Nuclear attack submarine
- Displacement: Over 10,000 t (9,800 long tons)
- Propulsion: Rolls-Royce PWR3+ nuclear reactor, pump-jet propulsor
- Sensors & processing systems: Evolved AN/BYG-1 Combat Management System
- Armament: Mark 48 torpedoes and cruise missiles with a VLS

The SSN-AUKUS, also known as the SSN-A and the Aukus-class submarine, is a planned class of nuclear-powered attack submarine (SSN) intended to enter service with the United Kingdom's Royal Navy in the late 2030s and Royal Australian Navy in the early 2040s. The class will replace the UK's Astute-class and Australia's Collins-class submarines.

The UK commenced an Astute class replacement project in 2018, which was later named the Submersible Ship Nuclear Replacement (SSNR). The ongoing SSNR design was renamed SSN-AUKUS in March 2023, under the 2021 AUKUS trilateral security partnership, when Australia joined the programme and additional US technology was incorporated into the design.

The UK plans to build up to twelve SSN-AUKUS submarines. Australia plans to build five SSN-AUKUS submarines in addition to acquiring three nuclear-powered Virginia-class submarines from the United States.

When in service with the Royal Navy and the Royal Australian Navy, submarine crews will train and patrol together and undertake joint maintenance and support. Components and parts will be shared with the US.

The class will be powered by Rolls-Royce PWR3+ nuclear reactors. The submarines will displace over 10,000 tonnes.

== Development ==
=== UK SSNR design ===
The United Kingdom began planning for the replacement of the Astute class of submarines in early 2018. Initially, the programme was known as the Maritime Underwater Future Capability (MUFC). The concept phase was scheduled to last for three years to assess requirements and consider options but was suspended for two years due to delays in the Astute-class and Dreadnought-class delivery programmes. In 2020, the Ministry of Defence recruited for a Submarine Delivery Agency Project Manager to work on the SSNR design and development process.

In March 2021, the government's defence paper Defence in a Competitive Age committed to funding the SSNR project. This was followed in September 2021 by an investment of £170 million by the government in the form of two £85 million contracts to BAE Systems and Rolls-Royce Holdings for early design work on the SSNR. The investment will support 350 jobs for the UK economy.

In November 2022, MSubs was awarded a £15.4m contract to build an XLUUV (Extra Large Uncrewed Underwater Vehicle) vessel which is to be delivered to the Royal Navy within two years. The 17-tonne vessel (known as Project Cetus) is described as being "the next step in developing autonomous underwater warfare capability" and is also to feed into the design of SSNR. The MSubs offering was delayed and eventually commissioned as HMS Excalibur in 2025. In parallel BAE Systems have developed an XLAUV (Extra Large Autonomous Underwater Vehicle) named Herne, demonstrated in November 2024 as another offering.

In January 2023, it was reported that the submarines were likely to incorporate a vertical launching system (VLS) for land-attack missiles. This would be a first for Royal Navy submarines, which currently launch land-attack missiles via their torpedo tubes. A VLS system was described as likely to increase interoperability options with the US Navy since future US land attack missiles may not have a horizontal launch option.

=== AUKUS ===
Following an 18-month consultation starting in September 2021, the design was renamed SSN-AUKUS in March 2023 when Australia joined the programme and additional US technology was incorporated, both as part of the AUKUS agreement. The submarines for the UK and Australia will share a common design.

==== United Kingdom ====
The British Prime Minister Rishi Sunak announced in March 2023 that the UK would boost defence spending by an additional £5 billion over two years, some of which would go towards funding "the next phase of the AUKUS submarine programme."

The first SSN-AUKUS class boat for the Royal Navy will begin construction in Barrow-in-Furness by 2027 and is expected to be operational as early as the late 2030s. The Royal Navy boats will be built by BAE Systems. As of 2023, the workforce at Barrow-in-Furness was being expanded from 10,000 to 17,000 to support both the Dreadnought class program and the SSN-AUKUS class.

In October 2023, the UK government announced a series of contracts with BAE Systems, Rolls-Royce and Babcock International, collectively worth £4 billion, to support the design and development of the submarine class up to 2028. These contracts will fund the finalisation of the submarine design, as well as procure long-lead items for the first UK submarine. £3.95 billion of the award went to BAE Systems to cover development work to 2028, infrastructure investment at Barrow, investment in its supply chain and the recruitment of over 5,000 employees.

In January 2025, Rolls-Royce was awarded a c. £9 billion, 8-year contract, named "Unity", by the UK Ministry of Defence. This contract includes the design, manufacture and support of all nuclear reactors in Royal Navy submarines. This will support the beginning of the previously announced SSN-AUKUS contracts.

In June 2025, the UK Ministry of Defence announced that the UK would build up to 12 SSN-AUKUS submarines. It is claimed the programme would support 30,000 jobs into the 2030s, as well as 30,000 apprenticeships and 14,000 graduate roles across the next 10 years. According to official plans, the expanded facilities at Barrow and Raynesway are estimated to result in the build of a new submarine every 18 months. Some analyses suggested this objective was too optimistic and unlikely to be realised without a significant expansion of submarine-building capacity. In September 2026 the Government indicated that construction on the first vessel would begin in 2027, though a firm commitment to the construction of 12 boats was absent from the announcement. Service entry for the first boat was anticipated in the latter 2030s.

==== Australia ====
Australia will operate two submarine classes, and if the build schedule for the SSN-AUKUS falls behind, has the option of purchasing up to two additional Virginia-class boats from the United States.

The Royal Australian Navy will acquire five SSN-AUKUS class boats that will be built at the Osborne Naval Shipyard in South Australia. A new submarine construction yard will be constructed at Osborne to be known as the Submarine Construction Yard. The Royal Australian Navy boats will be built by a joint venture between ASC, who constructed and maintain the Collins-class, and BAE Systems. The building of the first boat is to begin by the end of the 2030s with the boat delivered in the early 2040s. A boat will be built every three years.

Australia is to invest A$4.6 billion (£2.4 billion) to allow the expansion of Rolls Royce's Derby site, and alongside funding from the UK Ministry of Defence, the site will double in size creating a further 1170 jobs needed to support the delivery of the Australian boats.

In March 2023, Vice Admiral Jonathan Mead, head of the Australian Nuclear Powered Submarine Task Force, said the SSN-AUKUS design was "about 70 per cent mature".

On 26 July 2025, the Australian Foreign and Defence Ministers Penny Wong and Richard Marles signed the Geelong Treaty with their British counterparts, Foreign Secretary David Lammy and Secretary of State for Defence John Healey. The Geelong Treaty is a 50-year bilateral defence agreement to facilitate bilateral cooperation on the construction of Australia's SSN-AUKUS submarines.

In February 2026, the Albanese Government announced a A$310 million payment to the United Kingdom to acquire long-lead items for the nuclear propulsion systems of Australia’s first two SSN-AUKUS submarines under the AUKUS partnership. The components will be produced primarily by Rolls-Royce Submarines to support schedule certainty and supply-chain resilience. The investment complements Australia’s broader submarine program, including funding for a new submarine construction yard in Adelaide, with construction planned to begin before the end of the decade.

== Characteristics ==
=== Weapons and systems ===
The SSN-AUKUS class will incorporate US technology such as propulsion plant systems and components, a common vertical launch system and weapons. The submarines will also have a high degree of commonality with the Virginia-class, sharing elements of the propulsion plant, combat system and weapons, enhancing interoperability and Australia's transition to SSN-AUKUS.

In March 2023, Australian Minister for Defence Industry Pat Conroy said the submarines would have a vertical launch system capable of launching Tomahawk cruise missiles and hypersonic missiles. In November 2023, Conroy said the submarines would use an "evolved" version of the AN/BYG1 Combat Management System in use with the Virginia-class and Collins-class and will be armed with Mark 48 torpedoes.

=== Propulsion ===
The SSN-AUKUS class will be powered by Rolls-Royce PWR3+ pressurised water reactors, an enhanced variant of the PWR3 reactor planned for the Royal Navy's Dreadnought-class submarines. The reactors will be manufactured at the expanded Rolls-Royce Raynesway facility in Derby. The reactors will provide improved safety and flexibility, including the ability to rely on onboard power supplies instead of shore power while docked. The reactor cores are designed to last the entire operational life of the submarines. They will deliver power to a single pump-jet propulsion system. In May 2026, the UK Secretary of State for Defence John Healey announced that four reactors were under construction.

As a non-nuclear weapon state under the IAEA, Australia will not produce nuclear fuel for its SSNs. Under the AUKUS program, the United Kingdom will provide complete welded nuclear propulsion systems for the Australian built submarines.

== See also ==
- Australian Submarine Agency
- Defence Nuclear Enterprise
- Future of the Royal Australian Navy
- Future of the Royal Navy
- Nuclear power in Australia
- Royal Australian Navy Submarine Force
- Royal Navy Submarine Service
- SSN(X)-class submarine
