= Dounreay =

Location of two former nuclear research establishments in northern Scotland

Dounreay nuclear site
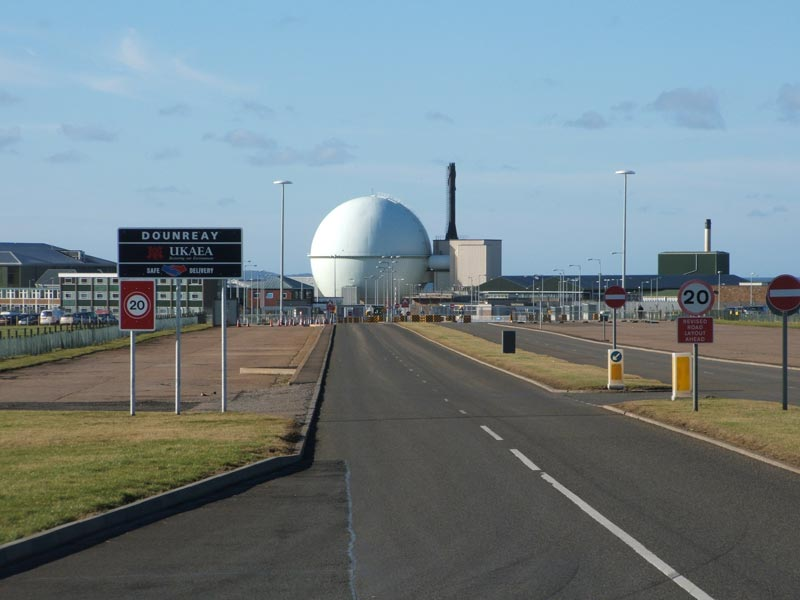
- View of site in 2006, with DFR sphere at centre
- Official name: NRS Dounreay; Formerly: UKAEA Dounreay; Dounreay Nuclear Power Development Establishment
- Country: United Kingdom
- Coordinates: 58.5801°N 3.7437°W
- Status: Decommissioning in progress
- Commission date: 1955
- Decommission date: 1994 (ceased generating but other activities continued)
- Owner: Nuclear Decommissioning Authority
- Operators: United Kingdom Atomic Energy Authority (1955–2008); Dounreay Site Restoration Limited (2008–2023); Nuclear Restoration Services (2023–present)
- Employees: 1,283 (staff); 700 (contractors) [2022]

Nuclear power station
- Reactors: 3
- Reactor type: Fast breeder reactor
- Site area: 135 acre

Power generation
- Units operational: None operational
- Nameplate capacity: DFR 14 MWe; PFR 250 MWe
- Annual net output: DFR; 55.9 GWh (Peak 1972); 32.1 GWh (Average 1972-77) PFR; 1042.6 GWh (Peak 1989); 528.1 GWh (Average 1978-91)

External links
- Website: www.gov.uk/government/organisations/nuclear-restoration-services
- Commons: Related media on Commons

Dounreay (/ˌduːnˈreɪ/; Scottish Gaelic: Dùnrath) is a small settlement and the site of two large nuclear establishments on the north coast of Caithness in the Highland area of Scotland. It is on the A836 road nine miles (fourteen kilometres) west of Thurso.

The nuclear establishments were created in the 1950s. They were the Nuclear Power Development Establishment (NPDE), now known as NRS Dounreay, for the development of civil fast breeder reactors, and the Vulcan Naval Reactor Test Establishment (NRTE), a military submarine reactor testing facility. Both have ended operations and are being decommissioned. The two establishments have been a major element in the economy of Thurso and Caithness, but this will decrease with the progress of decommissioning.

NRS Dounreay will enter an interim care and surveillance state by 2036, and become a brownfield site by 2336. An announcement in July 2020 that the Nuclear Decommissioning Authority (NDA) will be taking over direct management of the site from the site licence company Dounreay Site Restoration Limited (DSRL) in 2021 has alleviated fears of 560 job losses.

The NRTE is to be decommissioned under a ten-year contract starting in 2023, ending in the creation of a brownfield site, which would be transferred to the NDA.

== Dounreay settlement ==
Dounreay is the site of Dounreay Castle (now a ruin) and its name derives from the Gaelic for 'fort on a mound'. Dounreay was the site of the battle of Sandside Chase in 1437. Robert Gordon's map of Caithness, 1642, uses Dounrae as the name of the castle. William J. Watson's The Celtic Place-names of Scotland gives the origin as Dúnrath, possibly a reference to a broch.

Dounreay was the site of a Second World War airfield, named RAF Dounreay. It became HMS Tern (II) in 1944 when the airfield was transferred to the Admiralty from RAF Coastal Command as a satellite of HMS Tern at Twatt in Orkney. It never saw any action during the war and was placed into care and maintenance in 1949.

The Pentland Floating Offshore Wind Farm is proposed to be constructed about 7.5 km (4.7 mi; 4.0 nmi) offshore north of Dounreay. As of January 2026, it is expected to be commissioned in 2030.

== Nuclear sites ==
There are two nuclear sites at Lower Dounreay built on and around the site of the former airfield. The Nuclear Power Development Establishment site is owned by the Nuclear Decommissioning Authority (NDA) but was previously owned and run by the United Kingdom Atomic Energy Authority. Adjacent to this site is the Ministry of Defence Vulcan Naval Reactor Test Establishment. The two sites are best known for their five nuclear reactors, three formerly owned and operated by the UKAEA and two by the Ministry of Defence.

The sites are adjacent to the North Atlantic Ocean, with south east winds prevailing.

During the 1980s and 1990s, a visitor centre was opened in the former air traffic control tower. Visitors would be taken by bus to the PFR building where anything electronic, including watches and cameras, would be stored away securely until return. White coats were worn along with radiation badges. A guided tour through the air lock into the reactor building was then conducted, walking around the reactor core and then returning via scientists working behind thick mineral glass screens.

== Dounreay Nuclear Power Development Establishment ==
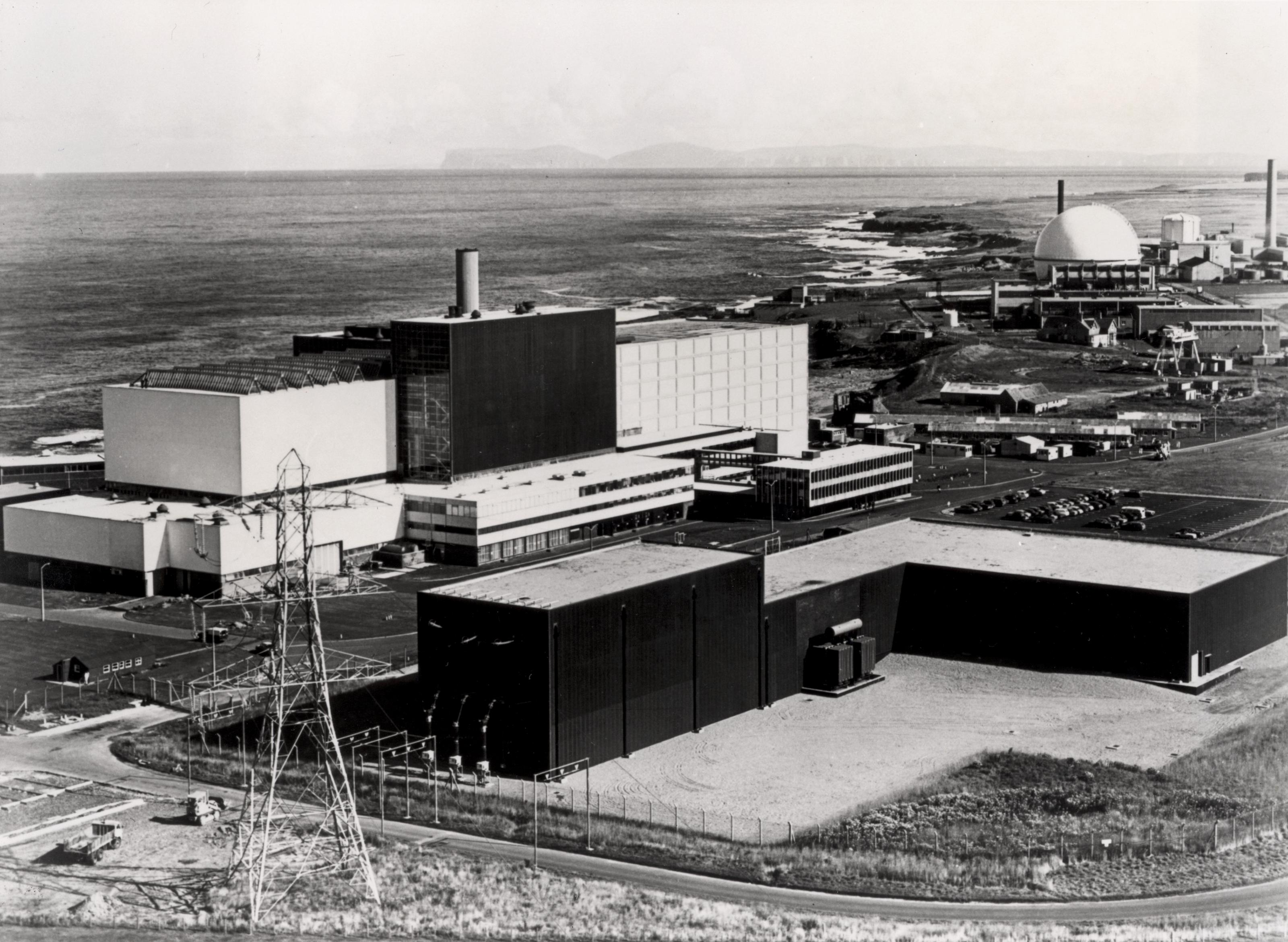
Aerial view ~1979. PFR in centre ground, DFR 'sphere' top right

Dounreay Nuclear Power Development Establishment was formed in 1955 primarily to pursue the UK Government policy of developing civil fast breeder reactor (FBR) technology. The site was operated by the United Kingdom Atomic Energy Authority (UKAEA). Three nuclear reactors were built there by the UKAEA, first a materials test reactor, then two fast breeder reactor prototypes. There were also fabrication and reprocessing facilities for the materials test rigs and for fuel for the FBRs.

Dounreay was chosen as the reactor location, remote from large centres of population, for safety reasons. The site was operated by the site licence company Dounreay Site Restoration Ltd (DSRL) from 2008, and in 2012 management was contracted out to a Babcock-led consortium. However, the NDA was to assume complete control when DSRL became a wholly owned subsidiary of the NDA in March 2021.

=== Dounreay Materials Test Reactor (DMTR) ===
The first of the Dounreay reactors to achieve criticality was the Dounreay Materials Test Reactor (DMTR) in May 1958, which was a DIDO class research reactor, producing a high neutron flux. This reactor was used to test the performance of materials under intense neutron irradiation, particularly those intended for fuel cladding and other structural uses in a fast neutron reactor core. Test pieces were encased in uranium-bearing alloy to increase the already high neutron flux of this class of reactor, and then chemically stripped of this coating after irradiation. DMTR was closed in 1969 when materials testing work was consolidated at Harwell Laboratory.

Schematic diagram showing the operation of the DFR, a NaK-cooled FBR Key: 1 / Fissile Pu-239 core; 2 / Control rods; 3 / U-238 Breeder blanket; 4 / Primary NaK coolant loop; 5 / Secondary NaK coolant loop; 6 / Secondary NaK circulator; 7 / Secondary heat exchanger; 8 / Primary heat exchanger; 9 / Primary NaK circulator; 10 / Boronised graphite neutron shield; 11 / Radiation shield

=== Dounreay Fast Reactor (DFR) ===
The second operational reactor (although the first to commence construction) was the Dounreay Fast Reactor (DFR), which achieved criticality on 14 November 1959. It was an experimental reactor designed to explore the possibility of fast breeder technology. Power was exported to the National Grid from 14 October 1962 until the reactor was taken offline for decommissioning in March 1977. DFR was a loop-type fast breeder reactor cooled by primary and secondary molten sodium–potassium alloy circuits, with 24 primary coolant loops. The reactor core was initially fuelled with uranium metal fuel stabilised with molybdenum and clad in niobium. It had over 5,000 breeder elements of natural uranium in stainless steel arranged in inner and outer breeder sections. It was designed to generate 60 MW thermal power and achieve a 2% fuel burn-up. It reached 30 MWt in August 1962, and 60 MWt in July 1963 allowing it to produce its rated 14 MWe (electrical). In May 1967 the molten coolant began leaking and the reactor was shut down for a year.

The reactor is surrounded by a 139-foot (42 m) steel sphere, still a prominent feature of the landscape, which was constructed by the Motherwell Bridge Company. The core was later used to test oxide fuels for PFR and provide experimental space to support overseas fast reactor fuel and materials development programmes.

DFR's peak annual net output of 55.9 GWh occurred in 1972, while the lifetime average annual net output was 32.1 GWh. During its operational lifespan, DFR produced over 600 million kWh of electricity, of which 540 million kWh was supplied to the grid. DFR and associated facilities cost £15 million to build in late-1950s money (equivalent to £370 million in 2021).

=== Prototype Fast Reactor (PFR) ===
The third and final UKAEA-operated reactor to be built on the Dounreay site was the Prototype Fast Reactor (PFR), intended to test components of a future full-scale fast breeder reactor. In 1966, it was announced that the PFR would be built at Dounreay. PFR was a pool-type fast breeder reactor, cooled by 1,500 tonnes of liquid sodium and fuelled with MOX. The design output of PFR was 250 MWe (electrical).

It achieved criticality in 1974 and began supplying National Grid power in January 1975. There were many delays and reliability problems before reaching full power. It had three cooling circuits. Leaks in the sodium water steam generators shut down one and then two of the cooling circuits in 1974 and 1975. By August 1976 it had reached 500 MWt, (to produce about 166 MWe) and in 1985 it first reached its design output of 250 MWe.. It has been reported that the capacity factor in the first 10 years of operations was 9.9%.

In 1988, it was announced that funding for FBR research was being cut from £105 million to £10 million per year, and the PFR funding would end in 1994.

The reactor was taken offline in 1994, marking the end of nuclear power generation at the site. It had supplied 9,250 GWh in all. The lifetime load factor recorded by the IAEA was 26.9%. The peak and lifetime average annual net outputs were 1042.6 GWh and 528.1 GWh, respectively.

The control panel for the reactor was earmarked for an exhibition on the reactor at the London Science Museum in 2016.

=== Fuel Cycle Area (FCA) ===
==== Material Test Reactor (MTR) Fuel Reprocessing Plant ====
A plant for reprocessing MTR fuel was built early in the life of the Dounreay facility and operated for over 30 years, reprocessing on a small scale both fuel from UKAEA and other British reactors and, on a commercial basis, some foreign fuel.

==== Dounreay Fast Reactor Irradiated Fuel Reprocessing Plant ====
In the late 1950s the Dounreay Fast Reactor Irradiated Fuel Reprocessing Plant was built to reprocess irradiated HEU core fuel from the 15MW(e) Dounreay Experimental Fast Reactor. The main output from this plant was a highly pure solution of enriched uranium nitrate solution for subsequent re-fabrication into fuel. It was not efficient to use this plant for reprocessing natural or low enriched fuel, Dounreay breeder blanket fuel was reprocessed at Windscale/Sellafield. In the 1970s this plant was substantially modified and enlarged to enable it to reprocess mixed oxide fuel from the commercial scale Prototype Fast Reactor (PFR) on site, which had a design output of 250MW(e). This fuel had a high plutonium content, unlike the HEU fuel previously handled, and a plutonium separation and purification line to produce plutonium oxide was added. The modifications included work to improve containment and to meet more modern safety standards.

=== Subsequent activity ===
Since the reactors have all been shut down, care and maintenance of old plant and decommissioning activities have meant that Dounreay has still retained a large workforce. Commercial reprocessing of spent nuclear fuel and waste on the Dounreay site was stopped by the UK government in 1998 although some waste is still accepted from other nuclear facilities in special circumstances.

== Significant accidents ==
=== Sodium explosion ===
A 65-metre (213 ft) deep shaft at the plant was packed with radioactive waste and at least 2 kg of sodium and potassium. On 10 May 1977, seawater, which flooded the shaft, reacted violently with the sodium and potassium, throwing off the massive steel and concrete lids of the shaft. This explosion littered the area with radioactive particles.

=== Radioactive fuel swarf ===
Tens of thousands of fragments of radioactive fuel escaped the plant between 1963 and 1984, resulting in fishing being banned within two kilometres (one nautical mile) of the plant since 1997. These milled shards are thought to have washed into the sea as cooling ponds were drained. As of 2011, over 2,300 radioactive particles had been recovered from the sea floor, and over 480 from the beaches. As of 2019 the 2 km ban on harvesting seafood was still in place, but there were no other restrictions.

=== Major power failure ===
Following an incident in May 1998, where a mechanical digger cut through a main power cable and interrupted the site's main and back-up electricity supplies for 16 hours, operations were halted in the Fuel Cycle Area (FCA) and a safety audit of the plant was undertaken by the UK Health and Safety Executive and the Scottish Environment Protection Agency. In September 1998, the highly critical report was published and made 143 recommendations for improvement.

The main points of concern were:

- Weak management and technical base due to organisational changes
- Over-dependence on contractors
- No comprehensive strategy for waste disposal
- Lack of progress with decommissioning
- Lack of integration of decommissioning and waste strategies
- Poor physical condition of plant
- Scope of rapid reporting was too narrow
- Failure to work to the standards required of a modern nuclear licensee

The final report in 2001 on the audit noted that the UKAEA had responded satisfactorily to 89 recommendations, and the remaining 54 would be responded to in the medium to long term. In November 1998, in the report Dounreay - The way ahead, the UKAEA announced a proposed timetable for accelerated decommissioning, reducing the original schedule from 100 years to 60 years. The cost was initially estimated at £4.3 billion. An accelerated decommissioning plan was welcomed by the Friends of the Earth Scotland, but the environmental group remained opposed to further fuel reprocessing at the site.

== Removal of fuel ==
Following the 1998 report, the Department of Trade and Industry was presented with three options for dealing with 25 tonnes of radioactive reactor fuel at Dounreay. The options were:

1. to reprocess it at Dounreay,
2. to reprocess some at Dounreay and some at Sellafield, or
3. to store it above ground at Dounreay.

A plan was eventually devised to remove irradiated and unirradiated fuel to the Sellafield nuclear site, starting in 2014. In 2018, the NDA reported that it would be completed in 2018/2019.

== Nuclear Decommissioning Authority ownership ==
On 1 April 2005, the Nuclear Decommissioning Authority (NDA) became the owner of the site, with the UKAEA remaining as operator. Decommissioning of Dounreay was initially planned to bring the site to an interim care and surveillance state by 2036, and as a brownfield site by 2336, at a total cost of £2.9 billion.

A new company called Dounreay Site Restoration Limited (DSRL) was formed as a subsidiary of the United Kingdom Atomic Energy Authority (UKAEA) to handle the decommissioning process. By May 2008, decommissioning cost estimates had been revised. Removal of all waste from the site was expected to take until the late 2070s to complete, and the end-point of the project was scheduled for 2300.

Apart from decommissioning the reactors, reprocessing plant, and associated facilities, there were five main environmental issues to be dealt with:

- A 65-metre-deep (213 ft) shaft used for intermediate-level nuclear waste disposal was contaminating groundwater, and would be threatened by coastal erosion in about 300 years. The shaft was never designed as a waste depository, but was used as such on a very ad hoc and poorly monitored basis, without reliable waste disposal records being kept. It was originally used to construct a tunnel for the sea discharge pipe. Later use of the shaft as a convenient waste depository had resulted in one hydrogen gas explosion caused by sodium and potassium wastes reacting with water. At one time it was normal for workers to fire rifles into the shaft to sink polythene bags floating on water.
- Irradiated nuclear fuel particles on the seabed near the plant, estimated to be about several hundreds of thousands in number, caused by old fuel rod fragments being pumped into the sea. The beach had been closed since 1983 due to this. In 2008, a clean-up project using Geiger counter-fitted robot submarines was planned to search out and retrieve each particle individually. Particles were still being washed ashore at Sandside Bay beach and one particle at a popular tourist beach at Dunnet in 2006. In 2012, a two million becquerel particle was found at Sandside beach, twice as radioactive as any particle previously found.
- 18,000 m^{3} (640,000 cu ft) of radiologically contaminated land, and 28,000 m^{3} (990,000 cu ft) of chemically contaminated land.
- 1,350 m^{3} (48,000 cu ft) of high and medium active liquors and 2,550 m^{3} (90,000 cu ft) of unconditioned intermediate-level nuclear waste in store.
- 1,500 tonnes (1,700 short tons) of sodium, of which 900 tonnes (990 short tons) are radioactively contaminated from the Prototype Fast Reactor.

Historically, much of Dounreay's nuclear waste management was poor. On 18 September 2006, Norman Harrison, acting chief operating officer, predicted that more problems will be encountered from old practices at the site as the decommissioning effort continues. Some parts of the plant are being entered for the first time in 50 years.

In 2007, UKAEA pleaded guilty to four charges under the Radioactive Substances Act 1960 relating to activities between 1963 and 1984, one of disposing of radioactive waste at a landfill site at the plant between 1963 and 1975, and three of illegally dumping radioactive waste and releasing nuclear fuel particles into the sea, resulting in a fine of £140,000.

In 2007 a new decommissioning plan was agreed, with a schedule of 25 years and a cost of £2.9 billion, a year later revised to 17 years at a cost of £2.6 billion.

Due to the uranium and plutonium held at the site, it is considered a security risk and there is a high police presence.

In 2013, the detail design of the major project to decommission the intermediate-level waste shaft was completed, and work was to begin later in the year. The work would include the recovery and packaging of over 1,500 tonnes of radioactive waste. As of 2013, the "interim end state" planned date had been brought forward to 2022–2025. In March 2014, firefighters extinguished a small fire in an area used to store low-level nuclear waste.

On 7 October 2014, a fire on the PFR site led to a "release of radioactivity via an unauthorised route". The Office for Nuclear Regulation (ONR) concluded that "procedural non-compliances and behavioural practices" led to the fire, and served an improvement notice on Dounreay Site Restoration Limited. In 2015, decommissioning staff expressed a lack of confidence in management at the plant and fear for their safety.

In 2016, the task of dismantling the PFR core commenced. Plans were also announced to move about 700 kg (1,500 lb) of waste Highly Enriched Uranium to the United States.

On 7 June 2019, there was a low-level radioactive contamination incident that led to the evacuation of the site. A DSRL spokesman said: "There was no risk to members of the public, no increased risk to the workforce and no release to the environment".

On 23 December 2019, the NDA announced completion of the transfer of all plutonium from Dounreay to Sellafield, where all significant UK stocks of plutonium are now held.

On 20 August 2020, a new date for the site to become available for other uses was announced of 2333, as part of a new draft strategy for reclamation.

In April 2023, Dounreay became a division of Magnox Ltd as part of a simplified operating model for the NDA group. The site licence was transferred from DSRL to Magnox Ltd, and employees at the Dounreay site were transferred from DSRL to Magnox Ltd. In October 2023, Magnox Ltd was re-branded as 'Nuclear Restoration Services', with the Dounreay division referred to as 'NRS Dounreay'.

=== Framework contracts ===
In April 2019, DSRL awarded six framework contracts for decommissioning services at Dounreay. The total value of these contracts is estimated to be £400 million.

== Vulcan Naval Reactor Testing Establishment (NRTE) ==
Adjacent to the Dounreay site is Vulcan NRTE. Formerly HMS Vulcan, Vulcan NRTE is a UK Ministry of Defence (MoD) establishment operated by Rolls-Royce Submarines. The site formerly operated two separate prototype nuclear reactors, trialling five different types of submarine reactor core.

== See also ==
- Nuclear power in Scotland
- Atomic Energy Research Establishment
- Nuclear power in the United Kingdom
- Energy policy of the United Kingdom
- Energy use and conservation in the United Kingdom
