= Rolls-Royce Submarines =

Submarine nuclear power subsidiary of Rolls-Royce Holdings

- Formerly: Rolls-Royce and Associates (1954–1999); Rolls-Royce Marine Power Operations (1999–2018)
- Type: Subsidiary
- Industry: Nuclear power
- Founded: 1954
- Parent: Rolls-Royce Holdings

Rolls-Royce Submarines, a subsidiary of Rolls-Royce, operates three sites licensed to handle nuclear material, two of which are at Raynesway in Derby, and the other at Vulcan Naval Reactor Test Establishment near Dounreay (now decommissioning).

The Manufacturing Site was licensed in August 1960 and deals with processing of uranium fuel and the fabrication of Rolls-Royce PWR nuclear reactors and cores for Royal Navy submarines, such as the new Dreadnought class and SSN-AUKUS.

The Neptune/Radioactive Components Facility Site was licensed in November 1961 and houses the Neptune test reactor which is used to conduct experiments on reactor cores.

It was created as a joint company in 1954 with the name Rolls-Royce and Associates; the associates being Vickers, Foster Wheeler and later Babcock & Wilcox. It changed its name on 15 January 1999 to Rolls-Royce Marine Power Operations Limited and is part of the marine business of Rolls-Royce plc. It changed its name again on 1 August 2018 to Rolls-Royce Submarines Limited.

As of 2026, largely to support the large SSN-AUKUS attack submarine programme for the UK and Australia, the Raynesway facility is being expanded with a long-term objective of doubling the size of the site. Ultimately this will create 1,170 skilled jobs in engineering, manufacturing and other technical areas. The building of a new Nuclear Core Production Capability at Raynesway is one of the nine most costly Defence Nuclear Enterprise programmes, each of which has a whole-life cost exceeding £10 billion.

== See also ==
- Defence Nuclear Enterprise
- Rolls-Royce SMR
