= Letters of last resort =

Orders for action in the event of nuclear attack on UK

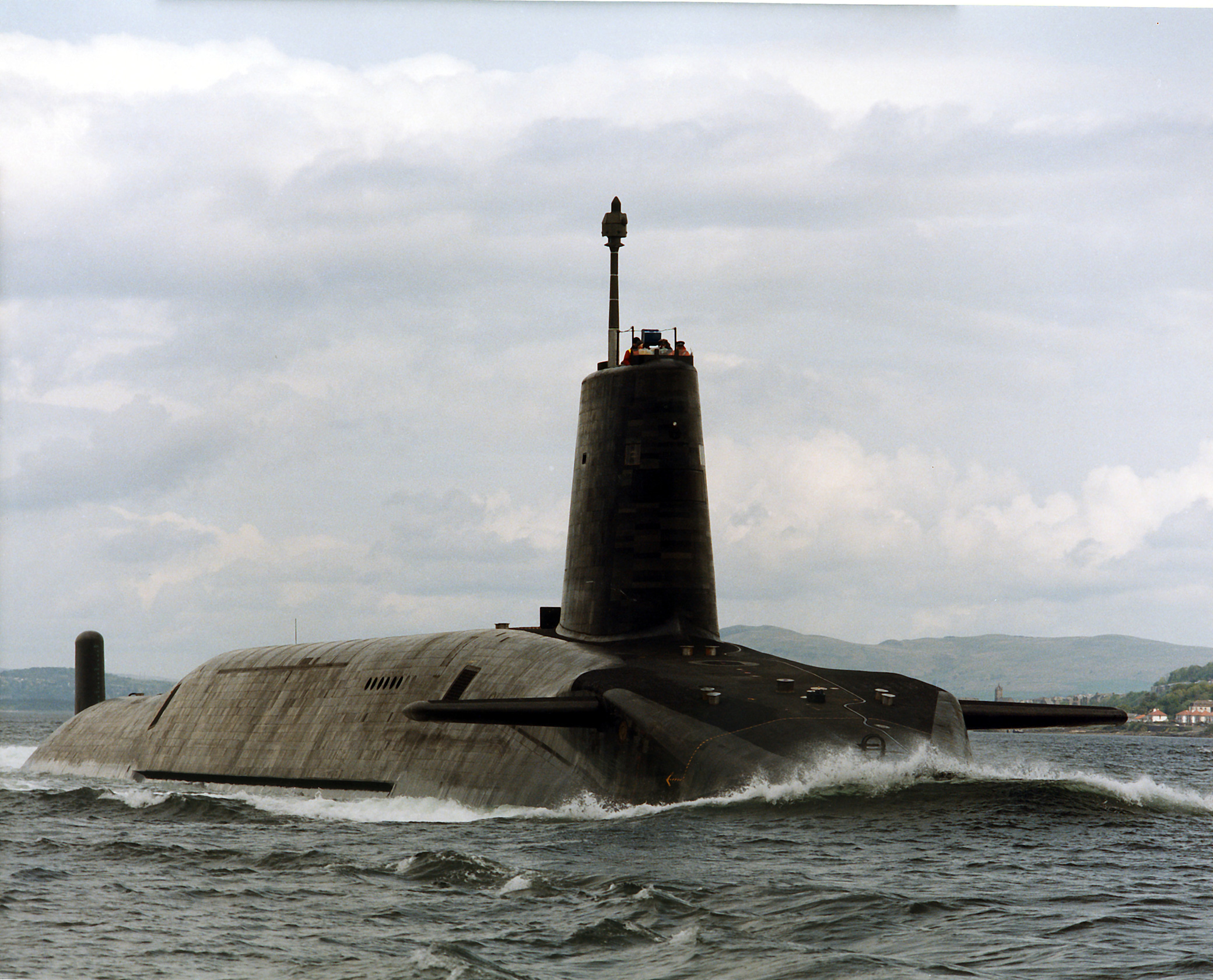
HMS Vigilant, one of four Vanguard-class submarines comprising the UK's nuclear deterrent.

The letters of last resort are four identically worded handwritten letters from the prime minister of the United Kingdom to the commanding officers of the four British nuclear-powered ballistic missile submarines. The letters are stored sealed and unread onboard each submarine. (Note: The United Kingdom relies on four Vanguard-class submarines to provide its nuclear deterrent. At least one submarine is always armed and on active service, carrying up to 16 Trident II submarine-launched ballistic missiles. Each missile has a range of 7,000 miles (11,000 km), and can carry 12 independently controlled warheads each capable of destroying a large city.) They contain orders on what action to take if an enemy nuclear strike has destroyed the British government.

The letters exist because the UK is the only nuclear power with comparatively little territory and a concentrated population, which make it especially vulnerable to a nuclear attack. The letters are destroyed unopened and replaced upon every change in the office of prime minister, so their contents remain known only to the issuer.

== Process ==
A new prime minister writes a set of letters after taking office and being told by the Chief of the Defence Staff "precisely what damage a Trident missile could cause". The documents are then delivered to the submarines in sealed envelopes, and the previous prime minister's letters are destroyed without being opened. The letters do not have to be written immediately after the briefing on Trident's capabilities, and in any case the previous prime minister's set of letters remains in effect until the new letters have been delivered to each submarine. Letters aboard Polaris submarines were accompanied by a separate letter from the Commander-in-Chief Fleet which was to be opened first as it contained the conditions for opening the prime minister's letter; no such letter has been referred to in accounts of the last resort procedure for Vanguard-class submarines.

In the event of the deaths of both the prime minister and their designated "second person" of responsibility, typically a high-ranking member of the Cabinet such as the deputy prime minister or the first secretary of state, the commanders of the nuclear submarines on patrol at the time would use a series of checks to ascertain whether the letters of last resort must be opened. In 1983, the procedure for Polaris submarine commanders was to first open the Commander-in-Chief Fleet's letter if there had been an evident nuclear attack on the United Kingdom or if all British naval communications transmitted from the UK had ceased for four hours. It has been reported that the process by which a Vanguard submarine commander would determine the continued existence of the British government involves the monitoring of a variety of communication signals, with the ability or inability to receive a BBC Radio 4 broadcast having particular significance.

== Options ==
While the contents of the letters are secret, there are four "basic" options given to the prime minister for inclusion. The prime minister might instruct the submarine commander to:

1. Retaliate;
2. Not retaliate;
3. Place the ship under the command of a surviving allied country such as Australia or the United States;
4. Use their own judgement.

The Guardian reported in 2016 that the options are said to include: "Put yourself under the command of the United States, if it is still there", "Go to Australia", "Retaliate", or "Use your own judgement". The actual option chosen remains known only to the writer of the letter, the Prime Minister.

== Fiction ==
David Greig's 2012 play The Letter of Last Resort deals with the consequences and paradoxes of the letters. The play was first staged in February 2012 as a part of a cycle of plays on "The Bomb" at the Tricycle Theatre in London, directed by Nicolas Kent, with Belinda Lang playing the role of the incoming prime minister and Simon Chandler, her advisor. The production was also seen at the Traverse Theatre in Edinburgh, for the Edinburgh Fringe later the same year. The following year it was broadcast on BBC Radio 4, with the same cast, first transmitted on 1 June 2013.

The KGB's attempts to obtain the contents of the letters of last resort are part of the plot of the BBC Cold War spy drama The Game (2014).

== See also ==
- Cheget
- Dead Hand
- Dead man's switch
- Fail-deadly
- Mutual assured destruction
- Nuclear football
- Nuclear weapons and the United Kingdom § Nuclear weapons control
- Operation Looking Glass
- Samson Option
- Trident nuclear programme
