= HMS Vigilant (S30) =

1996 Vanguard-class nuclear-powered ballistic missile submarine of the Royal Navy

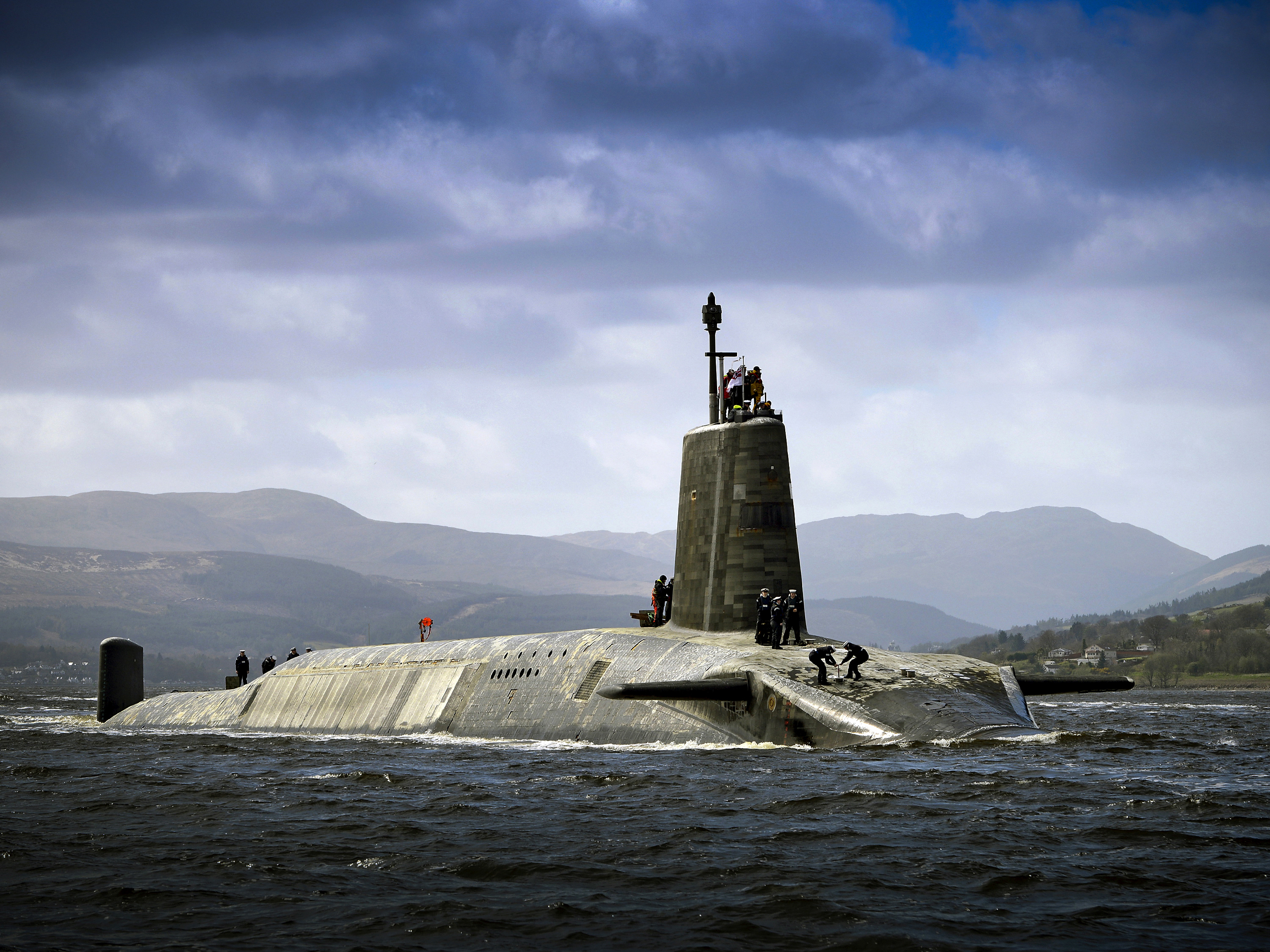
- Returning from patrol April 2014

History

United Kingdom
- Name: HMS Vigilant
- Laid down: 16 February 1991
- Launched: 14 October 1995
- Commissioned: 2 November 1996
- Home port: HMNB Clyde
- Status: In active service
- Badge

General characteristics
- Class & type: Vanguard-class submarine
- Displacement: 15,900 tonnes, submerged
- Length: 149.9 m (491 ft 10 in)
- Beam: 12.8 m (42 ft 0 in)
- Draught: 12 m (39 ft 4 in)
- Propulsion: 1 × Rolls-Royce PWR2 nuclear reactor; 2 × GEC turbines; 27,500 shp (20.5 MW); 1 × shaft, pump jet propulsor; 2 × auxiliary retractable propulsion motors; 2 × WH Allen turbo generators (6 MW); 2 × Paxman diesel alternators; 2,700 shp (2.0 MW)
- Speed: In excess of 25 knots (46 km/h; 29 mph), submerged
- Range: Only limited by food and maintenance requirements.
- Complement: 135
- Sensors & processing systems: BAE Systems SMCS; Kelvin Hughes Type 1007 I-band navigation radar; Thales Underwater Systems Type 2054 composite sonar suite comprising: Marconi/Ferranti Type 2046 towed array sonar; Type 2043 hull-mounted active and passive search sonar; Type 2082 passive intercept and ranging sonar; Pilkington Optronics CK51 search periscope; Pilkington Optronics CH91 attack periscope
- Electronic warfare & decoys: Two SSE Mk10 launchers for Type 2066 and Type 2071 torpedo decoys; RESM Racal UAP passive intercept
- Armament: 4 × 21-inch (533 mm) torpedo tubes for: Spearfish heavyweight torpedoes; 16 × ballistic missile tubes for: Lockheed Trident II D5 SLBMs with up to 12 MIRVed Holbrook Mk-4A (100 kt_{TNT}) nuclear warheads each

HMS Vigilant is the third Vanguard-class submarine of the Royal Navy. Vigilant carries the Trident ballistic missile, the United Kingdom's nuclear deterrent.

== Construction ==
Vigilant was built at Barrow-in-Furness by Vickers Shipbuilding and Engineering Ltd (now BAE Systems Submarine Solutions), was launched in October 1995, and commissioned in November 1996.

== Letter of last resort ==
Peter Hennessy visited Vigilant for the Today programme on BBC Radio 4 in 2007. He reported that there is a grey safe in the control room that has an inner safe that only the commanding officer and executive officer can open. In that safe is a letter from the current Prime Minister of the United Kingdom, the letter of last resort, which contains guidance and orders to be followed should the United Kingdom be attacked with nuclear weapons. This letter is identical to the other three letters in similar safes on the other three Vanguard-class submarines carrying the United Kingdom's nuclear deterrent.

== Operational history ==
In 2002, protestors from Trident Ploughshares breached security at Faslane Naval Base where the Vanguard-class submarines are based. Two protestors managed to spray paint Vigilant with the CND symbol and the word "Vile".

Vigilant arrived at Devonport on 11 October 2008 for a major refit. Vigilant returned to the fleet on 27 March 2012 after her £300m refit. In 2013, she test fired her main weapon, a firing of the Trident D5 after three years. Vigilant returned from a patrol on 23 December 2016 before Christmas.

In October 2017, it was revealed that the vessel's captain had been relieved of his command following allegations of an "inappropriate relationship" with a female crew member. Along with the captain, his executive officer was also removed from his post amid allegations of an improper relationship with a different female crew member. Later that month, it was reported that nine crew members had been dismissed for using cocaine.

In 2020, 30 crew members tested positive for COVID following a port visit to the U.S. Navy’s SSBN base at Kings Bay, Georgia. The incident followed reports that sailors had breached isolation protocols by travelling off‑base.

== See also ==
- List of submarines of the Royal Navy
- List of submarine classes of the Royal Navy
- Nuclear weapons and the United Kingdom
- Royal Navy Submarine Service
- Submarine-launched ballistic missile
- Trident nuclear programme
