= Nuclear weapons of the United Kingdom =

United Kingdom
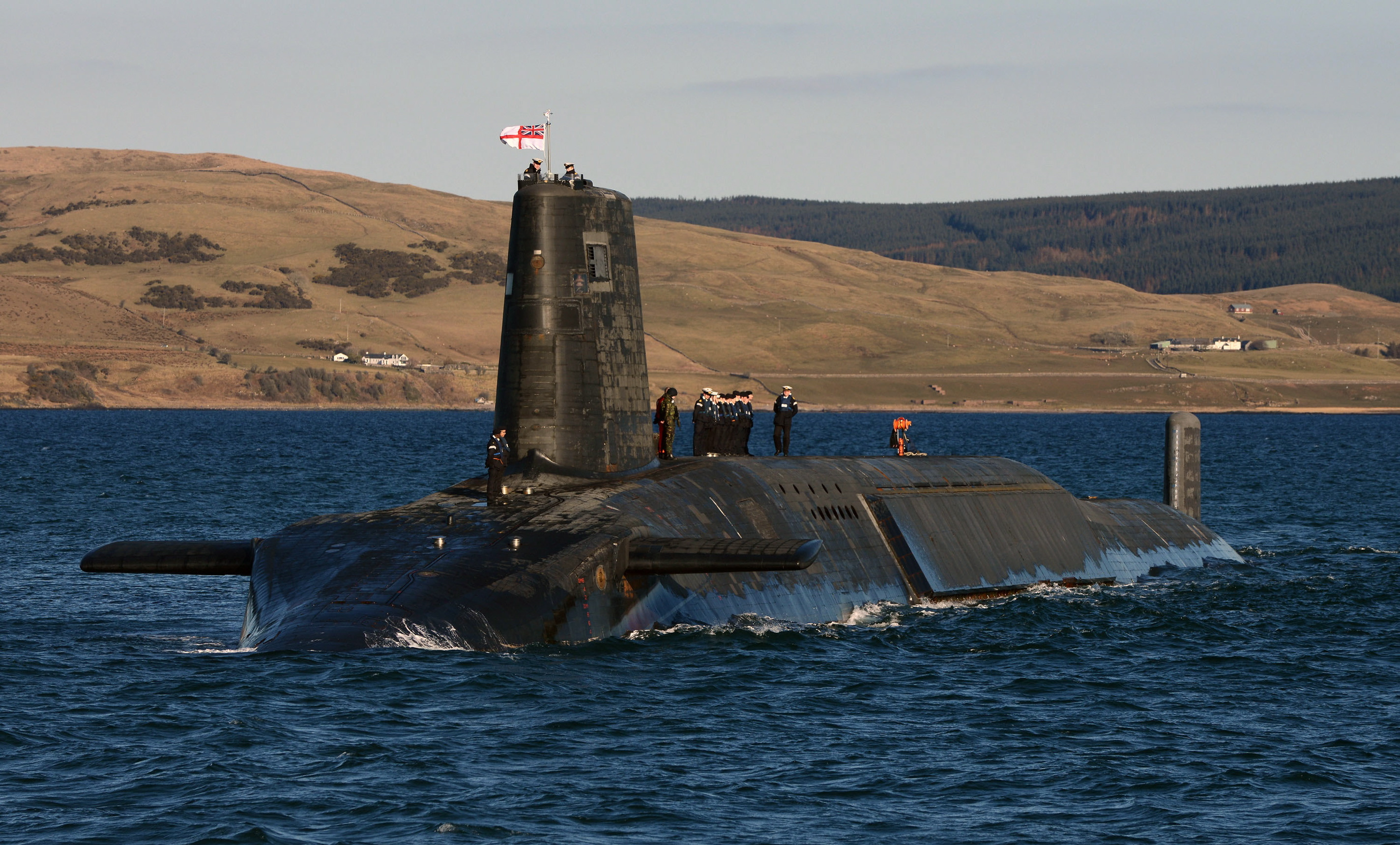
- HMS Victorious, one of four nuclear-armed ballistic missile submarines of the Trident programme

- Nuclear program start date: April 10, 1940; 86 years ago
- First nuclear weapon test: 3 October 1952 (Operation Hurricane)
- First thermonuclear weapon test: 15 May 1957 (Operation Grapple)
- Last nuclear test: 26 November 1991 (Operation Bristol)
- Largest yield test: 3 Mt (13 PJ)
- Total tests: 45 detonations
- Peak stockpile: 520 warheads (1970s)
- Current stockpile: 225–260 warheads
- Maximum missile range: 12,000 kilometres (7,500 mi) (Trident programme)
- Nuclear triad: No
- Strategic forces: Royal Navy; Vanguard-class submarines; Trident II ballistic missiles
- NPT party: Yes (1968, one of five recognised nuclear-weapon states)

The United Kingdom became the third country (after the United States and the Soviet Union) to develop and, in 1952, test nuclear weapons. The UK is one of nine nuclear-armed states, and one of five recognized by the Treaty on the Non-Proliferation of Nuclear Weapons. As of 2025, the UK possesses a stockpile of approximately 225 warheads, with 120 deployed on its only delivery system, the Trident programme's submarine-launched ballistic missiles. Additionally, United States B61 nuclear bombs have potentially been stored at RAF Lakenheath since 2025. In 2025, the UK announced plans to procure 12 F-35A aircraft capable of delivering B61s.

Trident consists of four Vanguard-class submarines, based at HMNB Clyde in Scotland. Each is armed with up to sixteen Trident II missiles, each carrying warheads in up to eight multiple independently targetable re-entry vehicles. Since 1969, the Royal Navy has operated the continuous at-sea deterrent: at least one nuclear-armed ballistic missile submarine always on patrol. Under the Polaris Sales Agreement, the US supplied the UK with Polaris missiles and nuclear submarine technology, in exchange for the general commitment of these missiles to NATO. In 1982, an amendment allowed the purchase of Trident II missiles, and since 1998, Trident has been the only British nuclear weapons system. The UK is the only nuclear-armed country to use exclusively sea-launched nuclear weapons.

UK nuclear command and control launch authority rests with the Prime Minister, or if unreachable a designated deputy, while it is possible the Chief of the Defence Staff holds a veto. In the event of a decapitation strike, handwritten letters of last resort from the Prime Minister are used to instruct submarine crews. UK nuclear weapons have no permissive action links or corresponding launch codes, thus submarine crews may independently launch a nuclear attack.

The UK initiated the world's first nuclear weapons programme, Tube Alloys, in 1941 during the Second World War. At the 1943 Quebec Conference, it was merged with the American Manhattan Project, but collaboration ended in 1946. The UK began an independent programme, High Explosive Research, testing its first nuclear weapon in 1952. In total the UK conducted 45 nuclear tests, 12 in Australia, 9 in the Pacific, and 24 at the Nevada Test Site, with its last in 1991. The UK and France are the only two nuclear-armed countries that have ratified the Comprehensive Nuclear-Test-Ban Treaty.

The British hydrogen bomb programme's success with its Operation Grapple Pacific nuclear testing led to the 1958 US–UK Mutual Defence Agreement. This nuclear Special Relationship has involved the exchange of classified scientific data, warhead designs, and fissile materials. UK warheads are designed and manufactured by the Atomic Weapons Establishment. During the Cold War, the Royal Air Force operated the V bomber fleet for strategic weapons, followed by aircraft in tactical nuclear roles using WE.177 bombs. The RAF also planned to operate the cancelled Blue Streak intermediate-range ballistic missile (IRBM). The RAF also briefly operated Thor IRBMs under US custody, while both the RAF and the British Army of the Rhine operated US-custody tactical bombs, missiles, depth charges and artillery. US Air Force nuclear weapons were stationed in the UK between 1954 and 2008, and from 2025.

== History ==
=== Tube Alloys ===
The neutron was discovered by James Chadwick at the Cavendish Laboratory at the University of Cambridge in February 1932, and in April 1932, his Cavendish colleagues John Cockcroft and Ernest Walton split lithium atoms with accelerated protons. In December 1938, Otto Hahn and Fritz Strassmann at Hahn's laboratory in Berlin-Dahlem bombarded uranium with slow neutrons, and discovered that barium had been produced. Hahn wrote to his colleague Lise Meitner, who, with her nephew Otto Frisch, determined that the uranium nucleus had been split, a conclusion they published in Nature in 1939. By analogy with the division of biological cells, they named the process "fission".

The discovery of fission raised the possibility that an extremely powerful atomic bomb could be created. The term was already familiar to the British public through the writings of H. G. Wells, with a continuously exploding bomb in his 1913 novel The World Set Free. George Paget Thomson, at Imperial College London, and Mark Oliphant, an Australian physicist at the University of Birmingham, were tasked with carrying out a series of experiments on uranium. Oliphant delegated the task to two German refugee scientists, Rudolf Peierls and Frisch, who ironically could not work on the university's secret projects like radar because they were enemy aliens and therefore lacked the necessary security clearance. In March 1940 they calculated the critical mass of a metallic sphere of pure uranium-235, and found that instead of tons, as everyone had assumed, as little as 1 to 10 kilograms (2.2 to 22.0 lb) would suffice, which would explode with the power of thousands of tons of dynamite.

Oliphant took the resulting Frisch–Peierls memorandum to Sir Henry Tizard, the chairman of the Tizard Committee, and the MAUD Committee was established to investigate further. It held its first meeting on 10 April 1940, in the ground-floor main committee room of the Royal Society in Burlington House in London. It directed an intensive research effort, and in July 1941, produced two comprehensive reports that reached the conclusion that an atomic bomb was not only technically feasible, but could be produced before the war ended, perhaps in as little as two years. The Committee unanimously recommended pursuing the development of an atomic bomb as a matter of urgency, although it recognised that the resources required might be beyond those available to Britain. A new directorate known as Tube Alloys was created to coordinate this effort. Sir John Anderson, the Lord President of the Council, became the minister responsible, and Wallace Akers from Imperial Chemical Industries (ICI) was appointed the director of Tube Alloys.

=== Manhattan Project ===
In July 1940, Britain had offered to give the United States access to its scientific research, and the Tizard Mission's John Cockcroft briefed American scientists on British developments. He discovered that the American S-1 Project (later renamed the Manhattan Project) was smaller than the British, and not as far advanced. The British and American projects exchanged information, but did not initially combine their efforts. British officials did not reply to an August 1941 American offer to create a combined project. In November 1941, Frederick L. Hovde, the head of the London liaison office of the American Office of Scientific Research and Development (OSRD), raised the issue of cooperation and exchange of information with Anderson and Lord Cherwell, who demurred, ostensibly over concerns about American security. Ironically, it was the British project that had already been penetrated by atomic spies for the Soviet Union.

The United Kingdom did not have the manpower or resources of the United States, and despite its early and promising start, Tube Alloys fell behind its American counterpart and was dwarfed by it. On 30 July 1942, Anderson advised the Prime Minister of the United Kingdom, Winston Churchill, saying: "We must face the fact that ... [our] pioneering work ... is a dwindling asset and that, unless we capitalise it quickly, we shall be outstripped. We now have a real contribution to make to a 'merger.' Soon we shall have little or none."

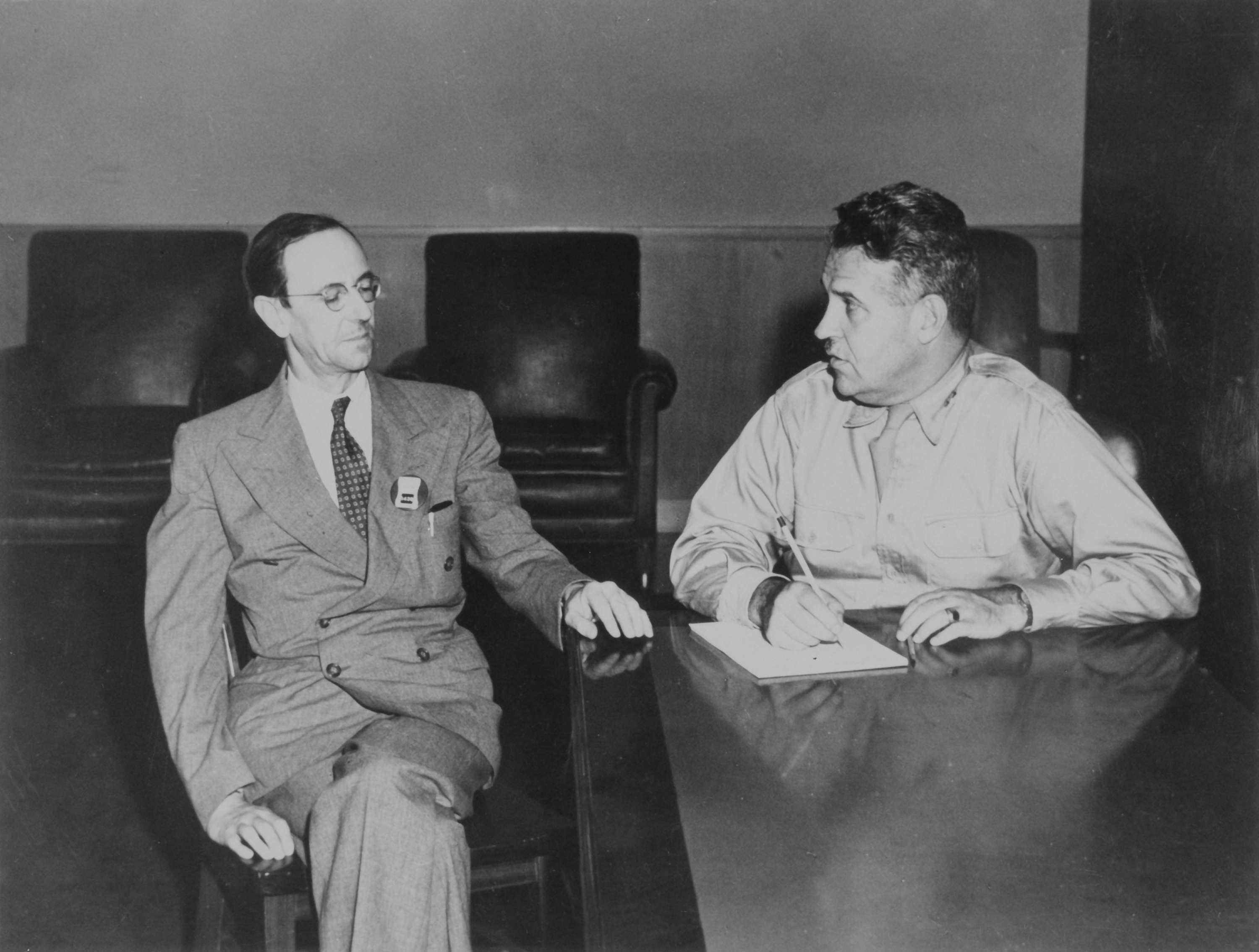
James Chadwick (left), the head of the British Mission, confers with Major General Leslie R. Groves, Jr. (right), the director of the Manhattan Project

The British considered producing an atomic bomb without American help, but it would require overwhelming priority, would disrupt other wartime projects, and was unlikely to be ready in time to affect the outcome of the war in Europe. The unanimous response was that before embarking on this, another effort should be made to secure American cooperation. At the Quebec Conference in August 1943, Churchill and the President of the United States, Franklin Roosevelt, signed the Quebec Agreement, which merged the two national projects. The Quebec Agreement established the Combined Policy Committee and the Combined Development Trust to coordinate their efforts, and specified that the weapons could only be used if both the US and UK governments agreed. The 19 September 1944 Hyde Park Agreement extended both commercial and military cooperation into the post-war period.

A British mission led by Akers assisted in the development of gaseous diffusion technology at the SAM Laboratories in New York. Another, led by Oliphant, who acted as deputy director at the Berkeley Radiation Laboratory, assisted with the electromagnetic separation process. Cockcroft became the director of the Anglo-Canadian Montreal Laboratory. The British mission to the Los Alamos Laboratory was headed by Chadwick, and later Peierls. It included distinguished scientists such as Geoffrey Taylor, James Tuck, Niels Bohr, William Penney, Frisch, Ernest Titterton and Klaus Fuchs, who was later revealed to be a Soviet spy. As overall head of the British Mission, Chadwick forged a close and successful partnership with Brigadier General Leslie R. Groves, the director of the Manhattan Project. He ensured that British participation was complete and wholehearted.

Penney worked on means to assess the effects of a nuclear explosion, and wrote a paper on what height the bombs should be detonated at for maximum effect in attacks on Germany and Japan. He served as a member of the target committee established by Groves to select Japanese cities for atomic bombing, and on Tinian with Project Alberta as a special consultant. Because the Quebec Agreement specified that nuclear weapons would not be used against another country without mutual consent, British authorisation was required for their use. On 4 July 1945, Field Marshal Henry Maitland Wilson agreed that the use of nuclear weapons against Japan would be recorded as a decision of the Combined Policy Committee. Along with Group Captain Leonard Cheshire, sent by Wilson as a British representative, Penney watched the bombing of Nagasaki from the observation plane Big Stink. He also formed part of the Manhattan Project's post-war scientific mission to Hiroshima and Nagasaki that assessed the extent of the damage caused by the bombs.

=== End of American cooperation ===
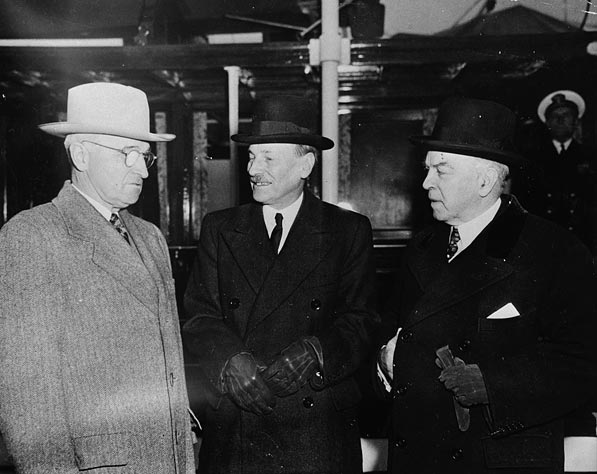
President Harry Truman and the prime ministers Clement Attlee and Mackenzie King boarding USS Sequoia for discussions about nuclear weapons, November 1945

With the end of the war, the Special Relationship between Britain and the United States "became very much less special". The British government had trusted that America would share nuclear technology, which it considered a joint discovery. On 8 August 1945, the Prime Minister, Clement Attlee, sent a message to President Harry Truman in which he referred to themselves as "heads of the Governments which have control of this great force". But Roosevelt had died on 12 April 1945, and the Hyde Park Agreement was not binding on subsequent administrations. In fact, it was physically lost. When Wilson raised the matter in a Combined Policy Committee meeting in June, the American copy could not be found.

On 9 November 1945, Attlee and the Prime Minister of Canada, Mackenzie King, went to Washington, D.C., to confer with Truman about future cooperation in nuclear weapons and nuclear power. A Memorandum of Intention they signed replaced the Quebec Agreement. It made Canada a full partner, continued the Combined Policy Committee and Combined Development Trust, and reduced the obligation to obtain consent for the use of nuclear weapons to merely requiring consultation. The three leaders agreed that there would be full and effective cooperation on atomic energy, but British hopes were soon disappointed; Groves restricted cooperation to basic scientific research.

The next meeting of the Combined Policy Committee on 15 April 1946 produced no accord on collaboration, and resulted in an exchange of cables between Truman and Attlee. Truman cabled on 20 April that he did not see the communiqué he had signed as obligating the United States to assist Britain in designing, constructing and operating an atomic energy plant. The passing of the Atomic Energy Act of 1946 (McMahon Act) in August 1946, which was signed by Truman on 1 August 1946, and went into effect at midnight on 1 January 1947, ended technical cooperation. Its control of "restricted data" prevented the United States' allies from receiving any information. The remaining British scientists working in the United States were denied access to papers that they had written just days before.

This partly resulted from the arrest for espionage of British physicist Alan Nunn May, who had worked in the Montreal Laboratory, in February 1946, while the legislation was being debated. It was but the first of a series of spy scandals. The arrest of Klaus Fuchs in January 1950, and the June 1951 defection of Donald Maclean, who had served as a British member of the Combined Policy Committee from January 1947 to August 1948, left Americans with a distrust of British security arrangements.

=== Resumption of independent UK efforts ===
Most leading scientists and politicians of all parties were determined that Britain should have its own nuclear weapons. Their motives included national defence, a vision of a civil programme for nuclear power, and a desire that a British voice should be as powerful as any in international debate. Attlee set up a cabinet sub-committee, the Gen 75 Committee (known informally by Attlee as the "Atomic Bomb Committee"), on 10 August 1945 to examine the feasibility of an independent British nuclear weapons programme. A nuclear reactor and plutonium-processing facility was approved by the Gen 75 committee on 18 December 1945 "with the highest urgency and importance". The Chiefs of Staff Committee considered the issue in July 1946, and recommended that Britain acquire nuclear weapons. They estimated that 200 bombs would be required by 1957.

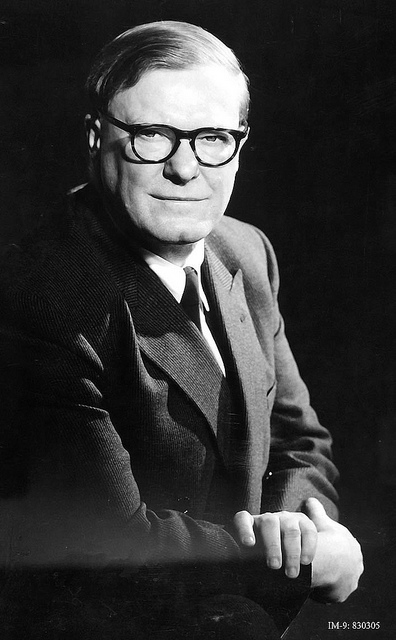
William Penney, Chief Superintendent Armament Research, was in charge of atomic bomb development.

The Tube Alloys Directorate was transferred from the Department of Scientific and Industrial Research to the Ministry of Supply effective 1 November 1945. To coordinate the atomic energy effort, Marshal of the Royal Air Force Lord Portal, the wartime Chief of the Air Staff, was appointed the Controller of Production, Atomic Energy (CPAE) in March 1946. The Gen 75 Committee considered the proposal in October 1946. In October 1946, Attlee called a meeting to discuss building a gaseous diffusion plant for uranium enrichment. Michael Perrin, who was present, later recalled that:

The meeting was about to decide against it on grounds of cost, when [Ernest] Bevin arrived late and said "We've got to have this thing. I don't mind it for myself, but I don't want any other Foreign Secretary of this country to be talked at or to by the Secretary of State of the United States as I have just been in my discussion with Mr Byrnes. We've got to have this thing over here, whatever it costs ... We've got to have the bloody Union Jack flying on top of it."

The decision to proceed was formally made on 8 January 1947 at a meeting of Gen 163, a subcommittee of the Gen 75 Committee consisting of six Cabinet members, including Attlee, and was publicly announced in the House of Commons on 12 May 1948. D notice No. 25 prohibited the publication of details on the design, construction or location of atomic weapons. The project was given the cover name "High Explosive Research". As Chief Superintendent Armament Research (CSAR, pronounced "Caesar"), Penney directed bomb design from Fort Halstead. In 1951, his design group moved to a new site at Aldermaston in Berkshire.

Production facilities were constructed under the direction of Christopher Hinton, who established his headquarters in a former Royal Ordnance Factory (ROF) at ROF Risley in Lancashire. These included a uranium metal plant at Springfields, nuclear reactors and a plutonium processing plant at Windscale, and a gaseous diffusion uranium enrichment facility at Capenhurst, near Chester. The two Windscale reactors became operational in October 1950 and June 1951. The gaseous diffusion plant at Capenhurst began producing highly enriched uranium in 1954.

Uranium ore was stockpiled at Springfields. As the American nuclear programme expanded, its requirements became greater than the production of the existing mines. To gain access to the stockpile, they reopened negotiations in 1947. This resulted in the 1948 Modus Vivendi, which allowed for consultation on the use of nuclear weapons, and limited sharing of technical information between the United States, Britain and Canada.

=== Unsuccessful attempt to renew American partnership ===
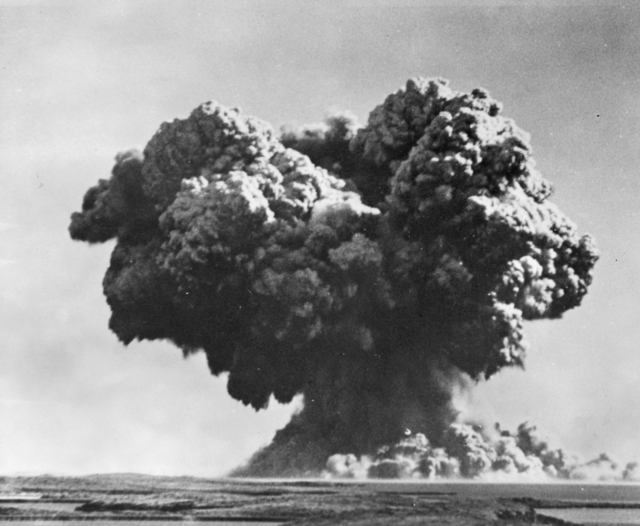
The UK's first nuclear test, Operation Hurricane, in Australia in 1952

The United States feared the USSR obtaining British atomic technology after conquering the United Kingdom in an invasion of western Europe. In February 1949 General Dwight D. Eisenhower offered to General Sir William Duthie Morgan American atomic weapons if the British programme ended. Britain would have used the weapons with its own aircraft for its own targets. Whether the McMahon Act would have permitted the transaction is unclear, but Britain refused because of its intention to develop its own weapons.

By that year, international control of atomic weapons seemed almost impossible to achieve, and Truman proposed to the Joint Committee on Atomic Energy in July a "full partnership" with Britain in exchange for uranium; negotiations between the two countries began that month. While the first Soviet atomic bomb test in August 1949 was embarrassing to the British (who had not expected a Soviet atomic weapon until 1954) for having been beaten, it was for the Americans another reason for cooperation. Although they would soon have their own nuclear capability, the British proposed that instead of building their own uranium-enrichment plant they would send most of their scientists to work in the US, and swap plutonium from Windscale for enriched uranium from the US. While Britain would not formally give up building or researching its own weapons, the US would manufacture all the bombs and allocate some to Britain.

By agreeing to subsume its own weapons programme within the American one, the plan would have given Britain nuclear weapons much sooner than its own target date of late 1952. Although Truman supported the proposal, several key officials, including the United States Atomic Energy Commission's Lewis Strauss and Senator Arthur Vandenberg, did not. Their opposition, along with security concerns raised by the arrest of Fuchs, who was working at Harwell, ended the negotiations in January 1950. After Britain developed nuclear weapons through its own efforts, the engineer Sir Leonard Owen stated that "the McMahon Act was probably one of the best things that happened ... as it made us work and think for ourselves along independent lines."

=== First test and early systems ===
Churchill, now again prime minister, announced on 17 February 1952 that the first British weapon test would occur before the end of the year. During Operation Hurricane, an atomic bomb was detonated on board the frigate HMS Plym anchored in a lagoon in the Monte Bello Islands in Western Australia on 3 October 1952. Britain thereby became the third country to develop and test nuclear weapons.

A Blue Danube bomb, Britain's first nuclear weapon

This led to the development of the first deployed weapon, the Blue Danube free-fall bomb. It had a 60-inch (1,500 mm) diameter, 32 explosive lens implosion system with a levitated pit suspended within a natural uranium tamper. The warhead was contained within a bomb casing measuring 62 inches (1,600 mm) diameter and 24 feet (7.3 m) long, and it weighed approximately 4.5 tonnes (4.4 long tons), of which about 2.5 tonnes (2.5 long tons) was high explosive. The first Blue Danube bombs were delivered to the Royal Air Force (RAF) Bomber Command in November 1953, although the bombers to deliver them did not become available until 1955. On 11 October 1956, a Vickers Valiant from No. 49 Squadron RAF piloted by Edwin Flavell became the first British aircraft to drop a live atomic bomb when a Blue Danube was exploded over Maralinga, South Australia during Operation Buffalo.

About fifty-eight Blue Danube bombs were produced. The first bombs had plutonium cores, but all service models were modified to use a composite core which used both uranium-235 and plutonium. The bomb had a nominal yield of 15 kilotonnes of TNT (63 TJ). The cores were stored separately from the high explosive components in concrete "igloos" at RAF Barnham in Suffolk and RAF Faldingworth in Lincolnshire. Some casings were stored elsewhere in the UK and in Cyprus for "second strike" use. It remained in service until 1962, and was replaced by Red Beard, a smaller tactical nuclear weapon. The Blue Danube cores were recycled, and the plutonium used in other nuclear weapons.

Being so big and heavy, Blue Danube could only be carried by the V bombers, so-called because they all had names starting with a "V". The three strategic bombers, known collectively as the V class, comprised the United Kingdom's strategic nuclear strike force during the 1950s and 1960s, which was known as V force of the Main Force. The three V bombers were the Vickers Valiant, which entered service in February 1955; the Avro Vulcan, which entered service in May 1956; and the Handley Page Victor, which entered service in November 1957. The V Bomber force reached its peak in June 1964, when 50 Valiants, 70 Vulcans and 39 Victors were in service.

=== Thermonuclear development ===
The Orange Herald test on 31 May 1957, claimed to be Britain's first H-bomb test at the time, as reported by Universal International Newsreel a few days later. In fact, it was a large fusion-boosted fission weapon test, but the fusion boosting worked very poorly.

A month after Britain's first atomic weapons test, America tested the first thermonuclear (hydrogen) bomb. The Soviets responded with Joe 4, a boosted fission weapon, in 1953. Penney feared that Britain could not afford to develop a hydrogen bomb, as did Tizard, who argued that the nation should focus on conventional forces instead of duplicating the nuclear capabilities of the American forces that were already defending Britain and Europe. He warned that: "We are a great nation, but if we continue to behave like a Great Power we shall soon cease to be a great nation. Let us take warning from the fate of the Great Powers of the past and not burst ourselves with pride."

The government decided on 27 July 1954 to begin development of a thermonuclear bomb, and announced its plans in February 1955. British knowledge of thermonuclear weapons was based on the work done at the Los Alamos Laboratory during the war. Two British scientists, Egon Bretscher and Klaus Fuchs, had attended the conference there on the Super (as it was then called) in April 1946, and Chadwick had written a secret report on it in May 1946, but the design was found to be unworkable. Some intelligence about Joe 4 was derived from its debris, which was provided to Britain under the 1948 Modus Vivendi. Penney established three megaton bomb projects at Aldermaston: Orange Herald, a large boosted fission weapon; Green Bamboo, an interim thermonuclear design similar to the Soviet Layer Cake used in Joe 4 and the American Alarm Clock; and Green Granite, a true thermonuclear design.

A miniaturised Green Granite, known as Short Granite, was tested in the Grapple 1 test in the first of the Operation Grapple test series. The bomb was dropped from a height of 45,000 feet (14,000 m) by a Vickers Valiant piloted by Wing Commander Kenneth Hubbard, off the shore of Malden Island in the Pacific on 15 May 1957. It was Britain's second airdrop of a nuclear bomb after the Operation Buffalo test at Maralinga on 11 October 1956, and the first of a thermonuclear weapon. Short Granite's yield was estimated at 300 kilotonnes of TNT (1,300 TJ), far below its designed capability. Despite its failure, the test was hailed as a successful thermonuclear explosion, and the government did not confirm or deny reports that the UK had become a third thermonuclear power.

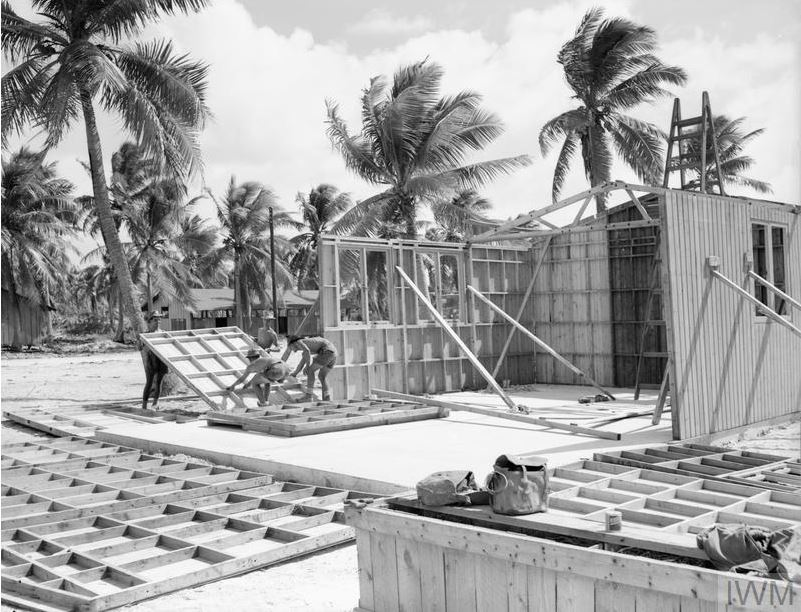
Royal Engineers assemble huts on Christmas Island.

The next test was Grapple 2, of Orange Herald, the first British weapon to incorporate an external neutron initiator. It was dropped on 31 May, and exploded with a force of 720 to 800 kilotonnes of TNT (3,000 to 3,300 TJ). The yield was the largest ever achieved by a single stage device, which made it technically a megaton weapon. The bomb was hailed as a hydrogen bomb, and the truth that it was actually a large fission bomb was kept secret by the British government until the end of the Cold War.

For the Grapple 3 test, Penney cancelled the planned Green Granite test and substituted Purple Granite, a Short Granite with some minor modifications. Its yield was a very disappointing 300 kilotonnes of TNT (1,300 TJ), even less than Short Granite; the changes had not worked. Despite contemporary newspapers reporting the series as a success, the reports would not have fooled the American observers into thinking they were thermonuclear explosions, as they were involved in their analysis. When documents on the Grapple series began to be declassified in the 1990s, the tests were denounced as a hoax.

An Operational Requirement (OR1142) was issued in 1955 for a thermonuclear warhead for a medium-range ballistic missile, which became Blue Streak. This was revised in November 1955, with "megaton" replacing "thermonuclear". Orange Herald could then meet the requirement. Codenamed Green Grass, the unsuccessful fusion boosting was omitted, and it used Green Bamboo's 72-lens implosion system instead of Orange Herald's 32. This allowed the amount of highly enriched uranium to be reduced from 120 to 75 kg. Its yield was estimated at 0.5 megatonnes of TNT (2.1 PJ). For use in the V bombers, it was placed in a Blue Danube casing to become Violet Club. Road transport of the weapon was hazardous. As a safety measure 120,000 steel ball bearings were used to fill a cavity inside the core and keep the fissile components apart. In an accident, the steel bung was removed and the ball bearings spilled on the floor of an aircraft hangar, leaving the bomb armed and dangerous. About ten were delivered.

The scientists at Aldermaston had not yet mastered the design of thermonuclear weapons. They produced a new design, called Round A. Another trial was scheduled, known as Grapple X. Round A was dropped on 8 November 1957. To save time and money, the target was off the southern tip of Christmas Island rather than off Malden Island, just 20 nautical miles (37 km; 23 mi) from the airfield where 3,000 men were based. This time the yield of 1.8 megatonnes of TNT (7.5 PJ) exceeded expectations. Round A was a true hydrogen bomb, but it used a relatively large quantity of expensive highly enriched uranium.

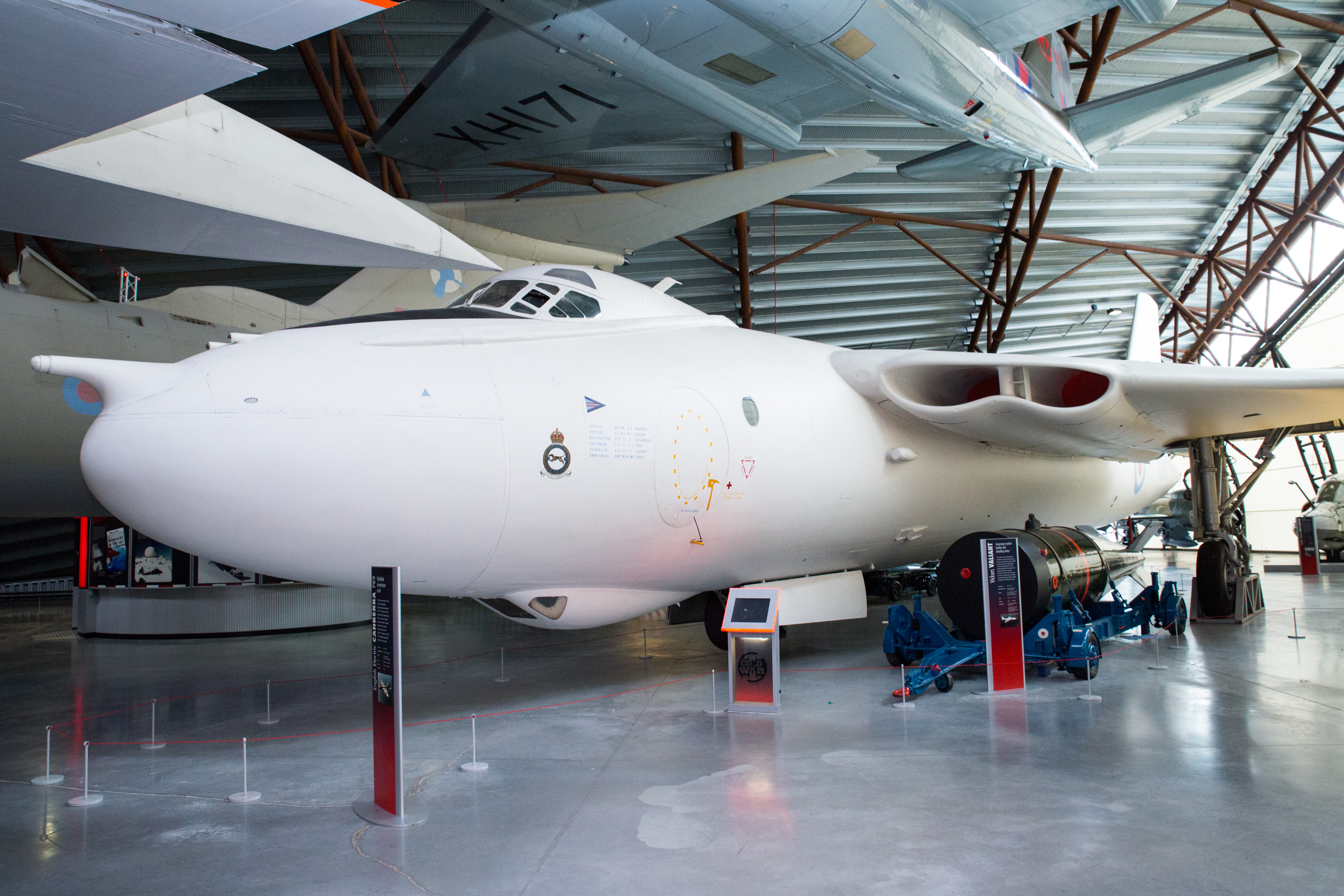
Vickers Valiant XD818 at the Royal Air Force Museum Midlands was the aircraft that dropped the bomb in the Grapple 1 test in May 1957.

Aldermaston had plenty of ideas about how to follow up Grapple X. A new design used lithium deuteride that was less enriched in lithium-6 (and therefore had more lithium-7), but more of it, thereby reducing the amount of uranium-235 in the core. Because of the possibility of an international moratorium on atmospheric testing, plans for the trial, codenamed Grapple Y, were given verbal approval by the Prime Minister, and known only to a handful of officials. The bomb was dropped off Christmas Island on 28 April 1958. It had an explosive yield of about 3 megatonnes of TNT (13 PJ), and remains the largest British nuclear weapon ever tested. The design of Grapple Y was notably successful because much of its yield came from its thermonuclear reaction instead of fission of a uranium-238 tamper, making it a true hydrogen bomb, and because its yield had been correctly predicted—indicating that its designers understood what they were doing.

Eisenhower, now US president, on 22 August 1958 announced a moratorium on nuclear testing. This did not mean an immediate end to testing; on the contrary, the United States, the Soviet Union and the United Kingdom all rushed to perform as much testing as possible before the deadline. A new British test series, known as Grapple Z, commenced on 22 August. It explored new technologies such as the use of external neutron initiators, which had first been tried out with Orange Herald. Core boosting using tritium and external boosting with layers of lithium deuteride were successfully tested, allowing a smaller, lighter two-stage devices. The international moratorium commenced on 31 October 1958, and Britain ceased atmospheric testing for good.

=== An independent deterrent ===
Believing that the United Kingdom was extremely vulnerable to a nuclear attack to which defence was impossible, the Chiefs of Staff and the RAF first advocated a British nuclear deterrence—not just nuclear weapons—in 1945: "It is our opinion that our only chance of securing a quick decision is by launching a devastating attack upon [enemy cities] with absolute weapons." In 1947, the Chiefs of Staff stated that even with American help the United Kingdom could not prevent the "vastly superior" Soviet forces from overrunning Western Europe, from which Russia could destroy Britain with missiles without using atomic weapons. Only "the threat of large-scale damage from similar weapons" could prevent the Soviet Union from using atomic weapons in a war.

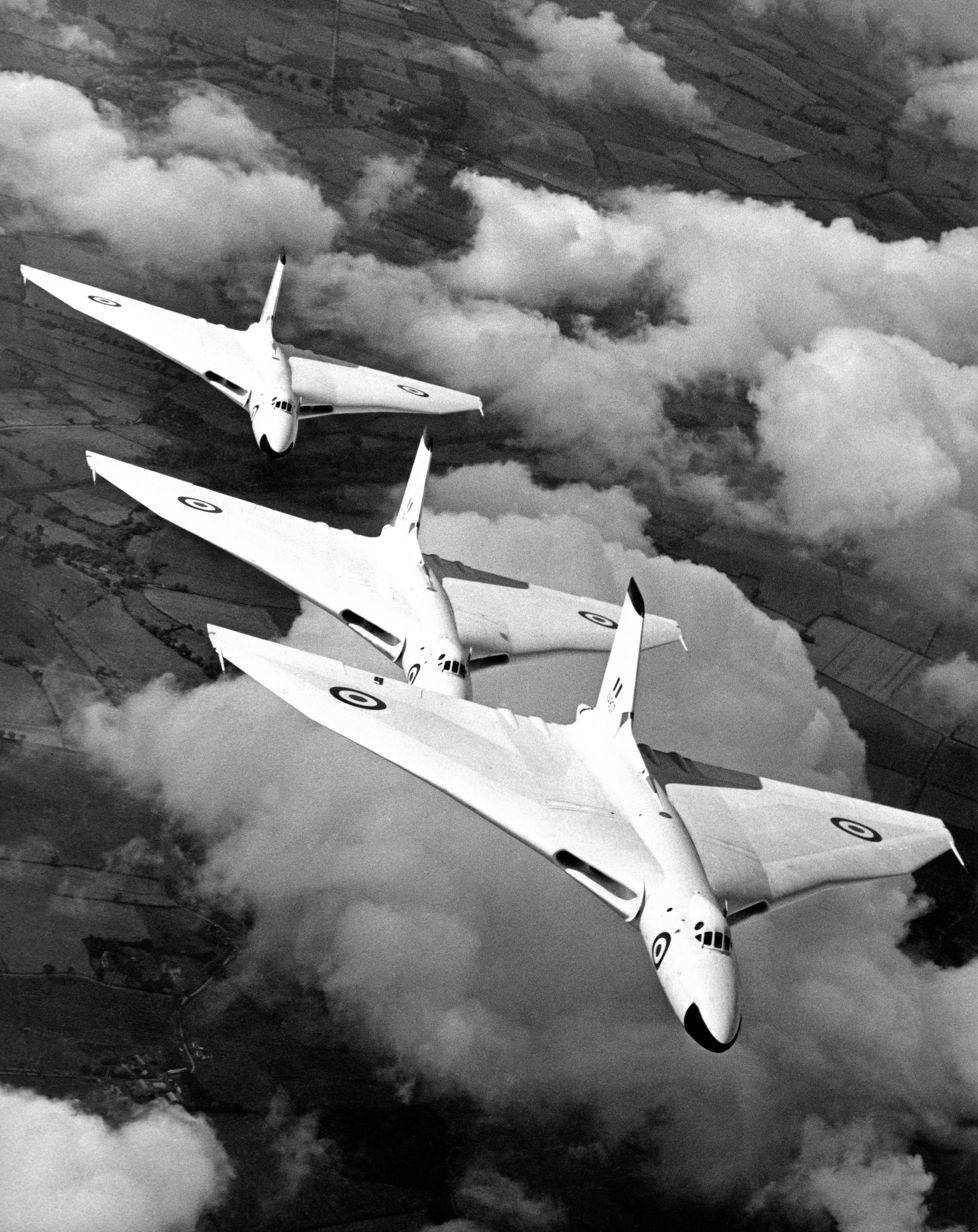
Avro Vulcan bombers

Air Chief Marshal Sir John Slessor, who became Chief of the Air Staff in 1950, wrote that year that the Soviet superiority in European forces was so great that even "an ultimatum by Russia within the next two to three years" might cause Western Europe to surrender without a war. He feared that the United Kingdom might also do so "unless we can make ourselves far less defenceless than we are now." By 1952, the Air Ministry had abandoned the concept of a conventional defence of Western Europe. The hydrogen bomb increased the threat to Britain. In 1957, a government study stated that although RAF fighters would "unquestionably be able to take a heavy toll of enemy bombers, a proportion would inevitably get through. Even if it were only a dozen, they could with megaton bombs inflict widespread devastation." Although disarmament remained a British goal, "the only existing safeguard against major aggression is the power to threaten retaliation with nuclear weapons."

Churchill stated in a 1955 speech that deterrence would be "the parents of disarmament" and that, unless Britain contributed to Western deterrence with its own weapons, during a war the targets that threatened it the most might not be prioritised. The Prime Minister, Harold Macmillan, advanced the position that nuclear weapons would give Britain influence over targeting and American policy, and would affect strategy in the Middle East and Far East. His Minister of Defence, Duncan Sandys, considered that nuclear weapons reduced Britain's dependence on the United States. The 1956 Suez Crisis demonstrated that Britain was no longer a great power, but increased the value to Britain of an independent nuclear deterrent that would give it greater influence with the US and USSR. While the military target of British nuclear weapons was the Soviet Union, the political target was the United States.

Independent targeting was vital. The Chiefs of Staff believed that—contrary to Tizard's view—once the Soviet Union became able to attack the United States itself with nuclear weapons in the late 1950s, America might not risk its own cities to defend Europe, or not emphasise targets that endangered the United Kingdom more than the United States. Britain thus needed the ability to convince the USSR that attacking Europe would be too costly regardless of American participation. Part of the perceived effectiveness of an independent deterrent was the willingness to target enemy cities. Slessor saw atomic weapons as a way to avoid a third devastating world war given that the two previous ones had begun without them. When Air Marshal Sir George Mills became head of RAF Bomber Command in 1955 he similarly insisted on targeting Soviet cities.

=== Renewed American partnership ===
The Soviet Union's launch of Sputnik 1, the world's first artificial satellite, on 4 October 1957, came as a tremendous shock to the American public, who had trusted that American technological superiority ensured their invulnerability. Now, suddenly, there was incontrovertible proof that, in some areas at least, the Soviet Union was actually ahead. In the widespread calls for action in response to the Sputnik crisis, officials in the United States and Britain seized an opportunity to mend the relationship with Britain that had been damaged by the Suez Crisis. Macmillan wrote to Eisenhower on 10 October urging that the two countries pool their resources to meet the challenge.

British information security, or the lack thereof, no longer seemed so important now that the Soviet Union was apparently ahead, and British scientists had demonstrated that they understood how to build a hydrogen bomb with a different form of the Teller-Ulam design to the Americans. The opposition that had derailed previous attempts was now absent. The McMahon Act was amended, paving the way for the 1958 US–UK Mutual Defence Agreement (MDA). Macmillan called this "the Great Prize".

Under the MDA, 5.37 tonnes of UK-produced plutonium was sent to the US in exchange for 6.7 kg of tritium and 7.5 tonnes of HEU between 1960 and 1979. Much of the HEU supplied by the US was used not for weapons, but as fuel for the growing fleet of UK nuclear submarines. Under the MDA, the US supplied the UK with not just nuclear submarine propulsion technology, but a complete S5W pressurised water reactor of the kind used to power the US Skipjack-class submarines. This was used in the Royal Navy's first nuclear-powered submarine, HMS Dreadnought, which was launched in 1960 and commissioned in 1963. The S5W had a nuclear reactor core that used uranium enriched to between 93 and 97 per cent uranium-235. Reactor technology was transferred from Westinghouse to Rolls-Royce, which used it as the basis for its PWR1 reactor used in the UK's nuclear submarines. The MDA has been renewed or amended many times. Most amendments merely extended the treaty for another five or ten years; others added definitions and made minor changes. On 14 November 2024, the Mutual Defence Agreement was extended indefinitely.

The nuclear weapon supply chain of the United Kingdom depends on the United States. A 1974 US proliferation report discussing British nuclear and missile development noted that "In many cases, it is based on technology received from the US and could not legitimately be passed on without US permission."

== Weapons systems ==
=== US nuclear weapons in British service ===
Production of British nuclear weapons was slow and Britain had only ten atomic bombs on hand in 1955 and just fourteen in 1956. At the three-power Bermuda Conference with Eisenhower in December 1953, Churchill suggested that the United States allow Britain to have access to American nuclear weapons to make up the shortfall. The provision on American weapons was called Project E. The agreement was confirmed by Eisenhower and Macmillan, who was now the Prime Minister, during their March 1957 meeting in Bermuda, and a formal Memorandum of Understanding (MOU) was signed on 21 May 1957.

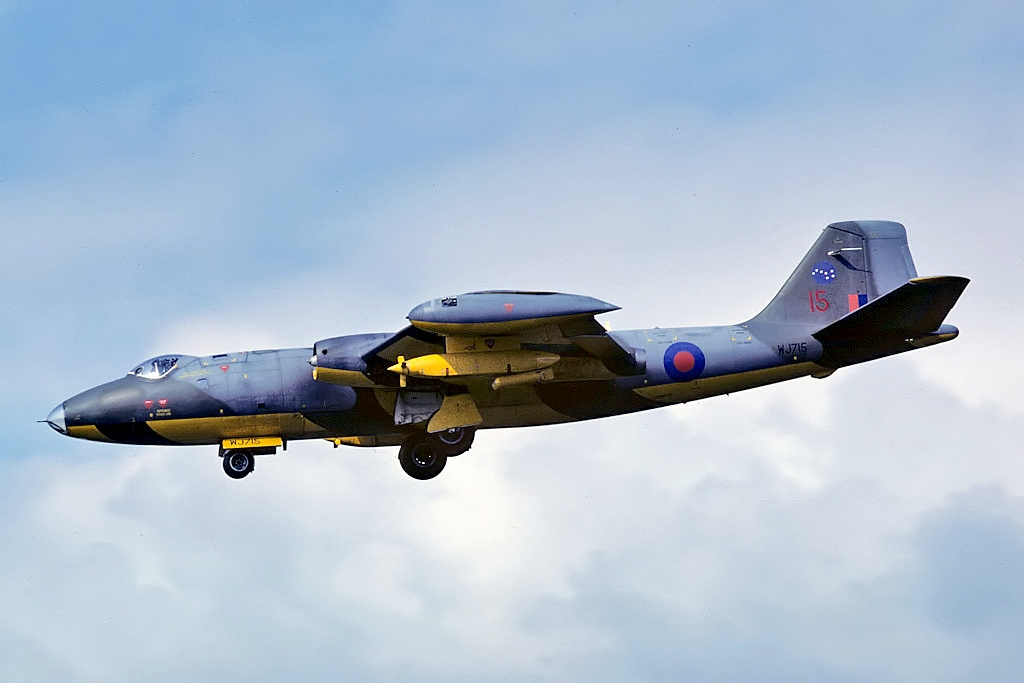
English Electric Canberra bomber

Four squadrons of English Electric Canberra bombers based in Germany were equipped with US Mark 7 nuclear bombs stored at RAF Germany bases. There were also four squadrons of nuclear-armed Canberras based in the UK, which were capable of carrying either the Mark 7 or Red Beard. They too were assigned to the SACEUR in October 1960. The planned V-bomber force was reduced to 144 aircraft, and it was intended to equip half of them with Project E weapons, so 72 Mark 5 nuclear bombs were supplied for the V-bombers. When the MDA came into force, the US agreed to supply the V-bombers with megaton weapons in place of the Mark 5, in the form of Mark 15 and Mark 39 nuclear bombs.

Under the Project E MOU, US personnel had custody of the weapons. This meant they performed all the tasks related to their storage, maintenance and readiness. The bombs were stored in Secure Storage Areas (SSAs) on the same bases as the bombers that British staff were not permitted to enter. It was therefore impossible to store British and American bombs together in the same SSA. US custody also created operational problems. The procedure for handing over the bombs added an extra ten minutes to the bombers' reaction time, and the requirement that US personnel had guardianship of the weapons at all times meant that neither they nor the bombers could be relocated to dispersal airfields as the RAF desired. The operational restrictions imposed by Project E "effectively handed the US government a veto over the use of half of Britain's nuclear deterrent".

The Air Council decided on 7 July 1960 that Project E weapons would be phased out by December 1962, by which time it was anticipated that there would be sufficient British megaton weapons to equip the entire strategic bomber force. Project E weapons were replaced by British Yellow Sun bombs. Problems encountered in the development of Red Beard meant that the replacement of kiloton weapons took longer than anticipated. The Air Ministry decided to replace the Canberras with Valiants as the long-range Vulcan and Victor V bombers became available. A Valiant squadron at RAF Marham was assigned to SACEUR on 1 January 1961, followed by two more in July. The UK-based Canberra squadrons were then disbanded. Each of the 24 Valiants was equipped with two Project E Mark 28 nuclear bombs. These were replaced by the newer Mark 43 nuclear bombs in early 1963. The Valiants were withdrawn from service in 1965.

Project E nuclear warheads were also used on the sixty Thor Intermediate Range Ballistic Missiles (IRBMs) that were operated by the RAF from 1959 to 1963 under Project Emily. During the Cuban Missile Crisis, the RAF's bombers and Thor missiles targeted 16 cities, 44 airfields, 10 air defence control centres and 20 IRBM sites. The RAF high command never warmed to missiles, and always ranked them secondary to the V bomber force. The missile bases were separate from the rest of the RAF and its personnel considered outside the mainstream. Project Emily gave the RAF considerable experience in missile operations, but the 1960 cancellation of Blue Streak in favour of the American Skybolt, an air-launched ballistic missile, rendered this expertise of dubious value. An Air Council meeting on 31 May 1962 decided that Project Emily should be terminated by the end of 1963, and the last Thor squadrons were inactivated on 23 August 1963.

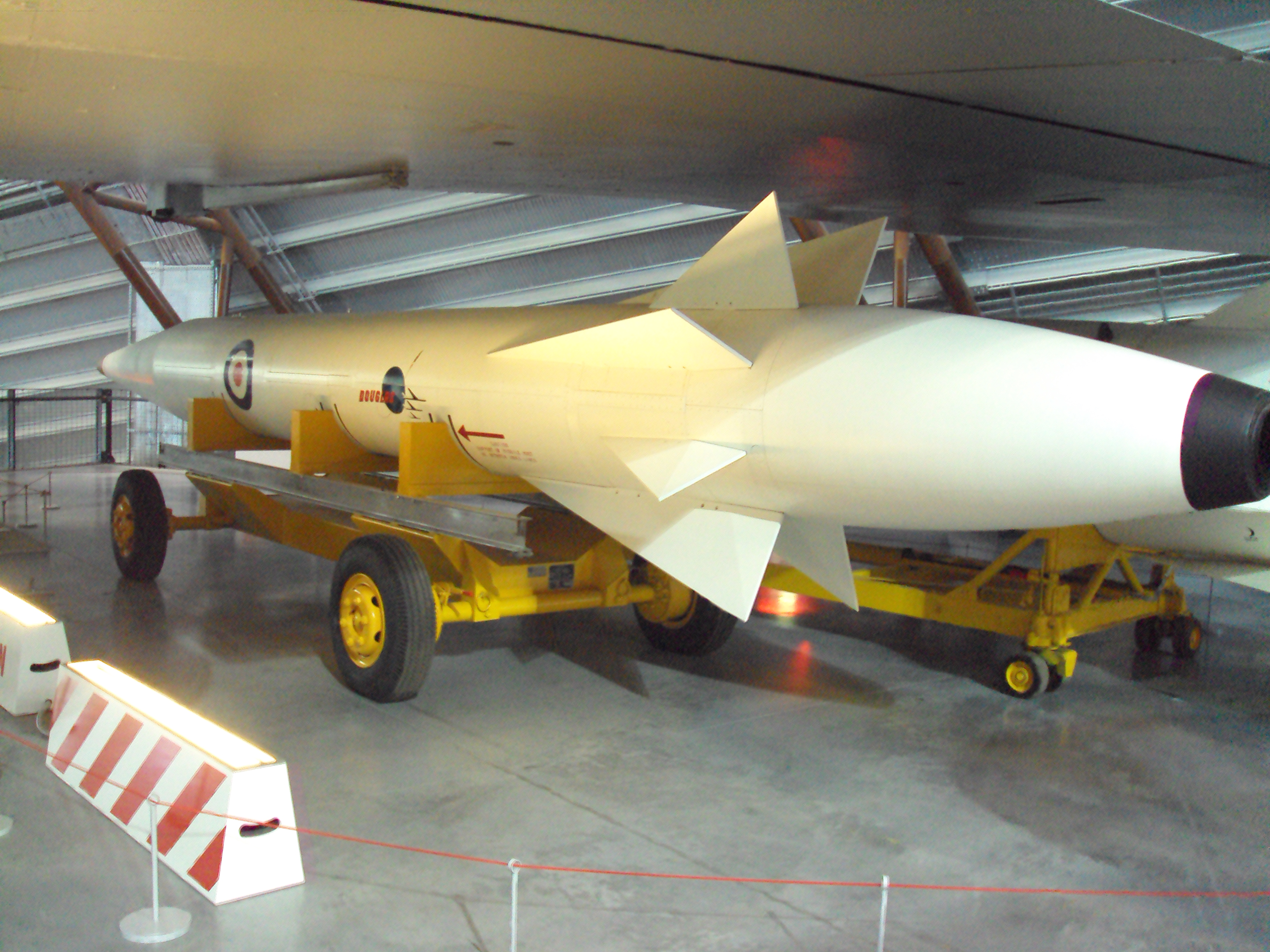
Skybolt missile

The British Army purchased 113 Corporal missiles from the United States in 1954. It was intended that they would be equipped with British warheads under a project codenamed Violet Vision, but Project E offered a quicker, simpler and cheaper alternative. The US supplied 100 W7 warheads, which had to be drawn from US Army storage sites in southern Germany until arrangements were made for local storage in August 1959. A British missile, Blue Water, with an Indigo Hammer warhead, was developed to replace Corporal. The US offered the Honest John missile as an interim replacement. The offer was accepted, and 120 Honest John missiles with W31 warheads were supplied in 1960, enough to equip three artillery regiments. Blue Water was cancelled in July 1962, and Honest John remained in service until 1977, when it was replaced by the Lance missile. The US also supplied the British Army of the Rhine (BAOR) with 36 W33 nuclear warheads that equipped four batteries of eight-inch M115 howitzers. These were later replaced by M110 howitzers. The British Army deployed more US nuclear weapons than the RAF and Royal Navy combined, peaking at 327 out of 392 in 1976–1978.

A maritime version of Project E, known as Project N supplied US Navy weapons. Providing American atomic bombs for Royal Navy ships would have involved similar dual key arrangements and detachments of US Marines on board Royal Navy ships, which was deemed impractical even for ships and weapons dedicated to use in European waters. However, RAF Coastal Command acquired Mk 101 Lulu nuclear depth bombs (with the W34 nuclear warhead) for its Avro Shackleton and Hawker Siddeley Nimrod maritime patrol aircraft from 1965 to 1971 under Project N. These were later replaced by the more capable Mark 57, which was stockpiled at RAF St Mawgan and RAF Machrihanish.

When the Cold War ended in 1991, the BAOR still had about 85 Lance missiles, and more than 70 W33 eight-inch and W48 155 mm nuclear artillery shells. The last Project E warheads, including the Mark 57 nuclear depth bombs and those used by the BAOR, were withdrawn in July 1992.

==== F-35A procurement ====
In June 2025, the UK announced plans to purchase 12 F-35A aircraft, capable of carrying both conventional and nuclear weapons such as the B61-12 gravity bomb. The aircraft will be based at RAF Marham in Norfolk. The purchase is also part of a previous plan to procure up to 138 F-35s in total. The decision followed the publication of the Strategic Defence Review on 2 June 2025, suggesting the UK faced new nuclear risks with states diversifying their nuclear arsenals, and a National Security Strategy on 24 June 2025, advocating for the UK to be prepared for a scenario involving a direct invasion of the UK homeland. The aircraft will form part of NATO's dual capable aircraft programme, involving American B61 bombs stockpiled in Europe, carried on allied aircraft. The use of these weapons would require the authorisation of the NATO nuclear planning group as well as the US president and British prime minister.

=== US nuclear weapons in US service in the UK ===
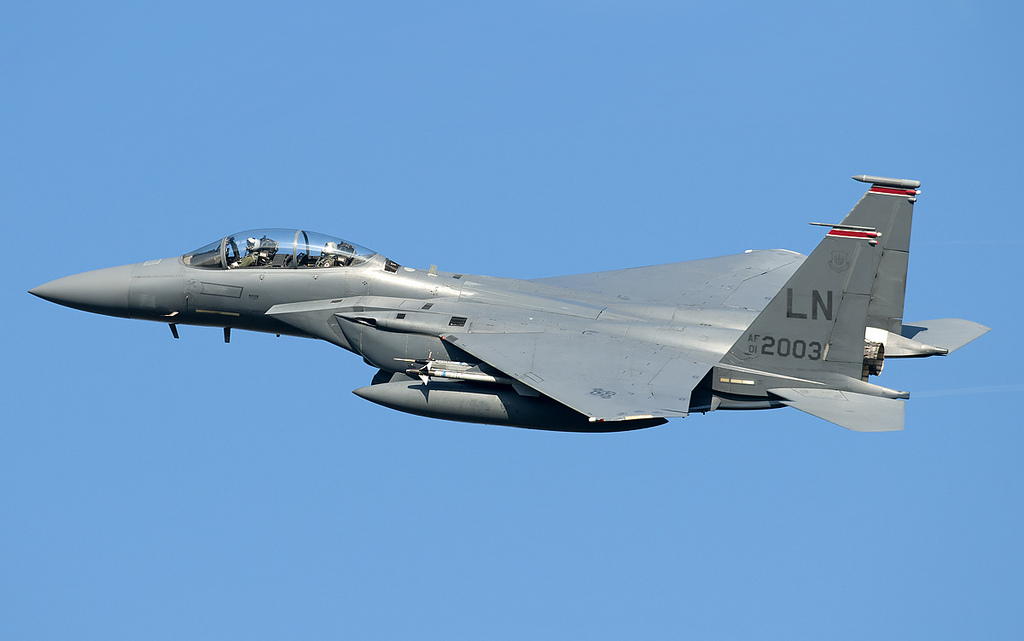
USAF F-15E of 494th Fighter Squadron stationed at RAF Lakenheath

In the early years of the Cold War, the majority of the bomber force of the US Strategic Air Command (SAC) was made up of World War II vintage Boeing B-29 Superfortress bombers, and their successors, the Boeing B-50 Superfortress and the Boeing B-47 Stratojet, all of which lacked the range to reach targets in the Soviet Union from bases in the continental United States. Only the small number of Convair B-36 Peacemaker bombers could do this. Overseas bases were therefore required, and the need for bases in the UK was a feature of American war planning for over a decade.

Obtaining British permission was easy thanks to the wartime comradeship between the RAF and the United States Army Air Forces (USAAF). Bypassing the politicians, General Carl Spaatz, the commander of the USAAF, came to an agreement with the Chief of the Air Staff, Marshal of the Royal Air Force Lord Tedder, in June and July 1946. Work began on extended and strengthened runways at RAF airbases in East Anglia to receive the B-29s. In June 1947, nine B-29s of the 97th Bombardment Group deployed to RAF Marham, where they were greeted by Tedder. This was merely a test; the bombers were not nuclear-capable. Only the Silverplate B-29s of the 509th Bombardment Group could do so. Their first deployment was in April 1949. Ninety sets of bomb assemblies—atomic bombs without the fissile cores—were stored in the UK by July 1950, and authority to deploy the cores as well was given in April 1954.

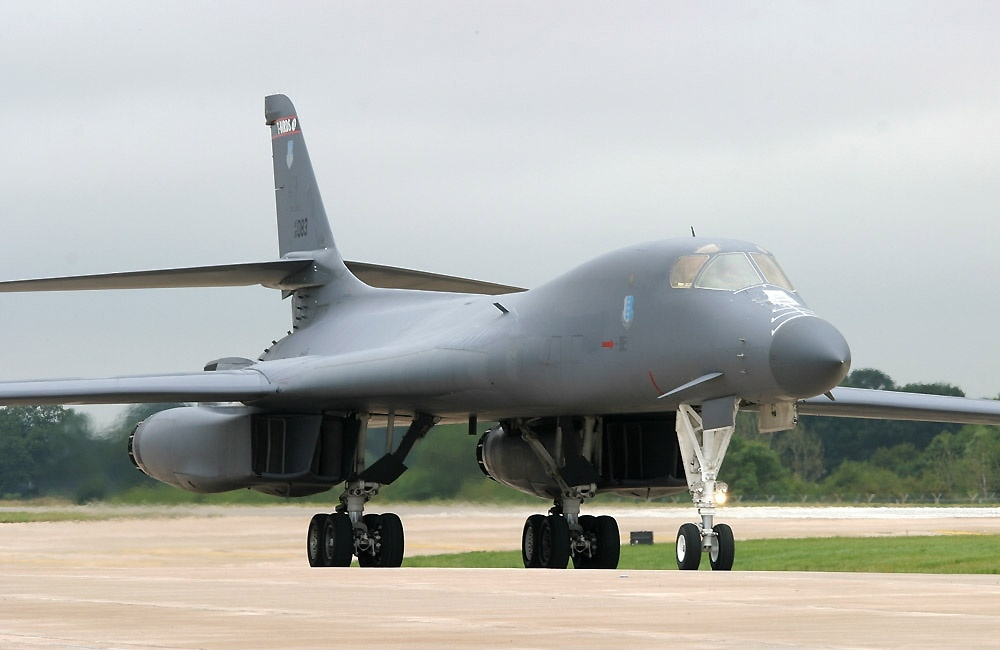
A Rockwell B-1B Lancer of the 28th Bombardment Wing at RAF Fairford in 2004

The 3rd Air Division was formed in 1949 to control the deployments of B-29s to the UK. It was soon upgraded to the status of a major command, and became the Third Air Force in May 1951 as part of the United States Air Forces in Europe. SAC then formed the 7th Air Division to control the nuclear bomber deployments. With the introduction to service of long-range bombers and intercontinental ballistic missiles, the need for a SAC presence in the UK diminished, On 3 April 1964, the last SAC aircraft, a B-47 from the 380th Bombardment Wing, left RAF Brize Norton, ending nearly 12 years' of continual B-47 deployments, and the 7th Air Division on 30 June 1964. During the later Cold War years, Boeing B-52 Stratofortress bombers became regular visitors to the United Kingdom, turning up at bases such as RAF Greenham Common and also taking part in RAF Bomber competitions, but were deployed to NATO on an individual basis, not as groups or wings. In 1962 there were one or two visits each month.

In fulfilment of NATO's plans to halt a Soviet invasion of Western Europe using tactical nuclear weapons, the 3rd Air Force received its own nuclear weapons when the 20th Fighter Wing deployed to RAF Wethersfield in Essex on 1 June 1952, with Republic F-84F Thunderstreak fighters and Mark 7 nuclear bombs. It reequipped with the North American F-100 Super Sabre in 1957, and the General Dynamics F-111 in 1970. In the 1970s, up to 60 F-111s based in the UK were on quick reaction alert, each carrying multiple B61 nuclear bombs. US Navy Polaris ballistic missile submarines were based at Holy Loch in Scotland from March 1961. During the 1980s nuclear armed USAF Ground Launched Cruise Missiles (GLCMs) were deployed at RAF Greenham Common and RAF Molesworth, as a consequence of the 1979 NATO Double-Track Decision, under which NATO countries agreed to modernise the alliance's nuclear weapons.

Under the terms of the 1987 Intermediate-Range Nuclear Forces Treaty with the Soviet Union, the United States withdrew its surface naval nuclear weapons and short-range nuclear forces. The GLCMs were withdrawn from the UK in 1991, and the Polaris submarine base at Holy Loch was closed in 1992. The US continued to store tactical nuclear weapons in the UK until 2008, when approximately 110 tactical B61s stored at RAF Lakenheath for deployment by USAF F-15E Strike Eagle aircraft were removed.

==== Return in 2025 ====
After two years of storage preparations at RAF Lakenheath, US nuclear weapons returned to the UK in 2025. Analysts concluded that B61 Mod 12 gravity bombs with a maximum yield of 50 kt were flown by Boeing C-17 Globemaster IIIs to the base on 18 July and 25 July. B61s can be carried by F-35As and F-15Es of the 48th Fighter Wing. After the Campaign for Nuclear Disarmament and other groups called for an official acknowledgement, the US and UK defence departments reiterated their policy to not confirm or deny the presence of nuclear weapons.

In April 2025, the Campaign for Nuclear Disarmament prompted the declassification of a 2021 Ministry of Defence order that exempted the government and Visiting Forces, primarily of the US military, from legal responsibilities related to radiation. The order specifically exempted US-used bases from the requirement to have plans and measures for emergencies involving radioactive materials and nuclear weapons and the requirement to notify local councils of their presence so they can produce coordinate plans. These include Lakenheath; RAF Brize Norton, where UK nuclear weapons are transported; and RAF Fairford, where nuclear-capable B-2 Spirit and B-52H Stratofortress bombers can be deployed.

=== British nuclear weapons ===
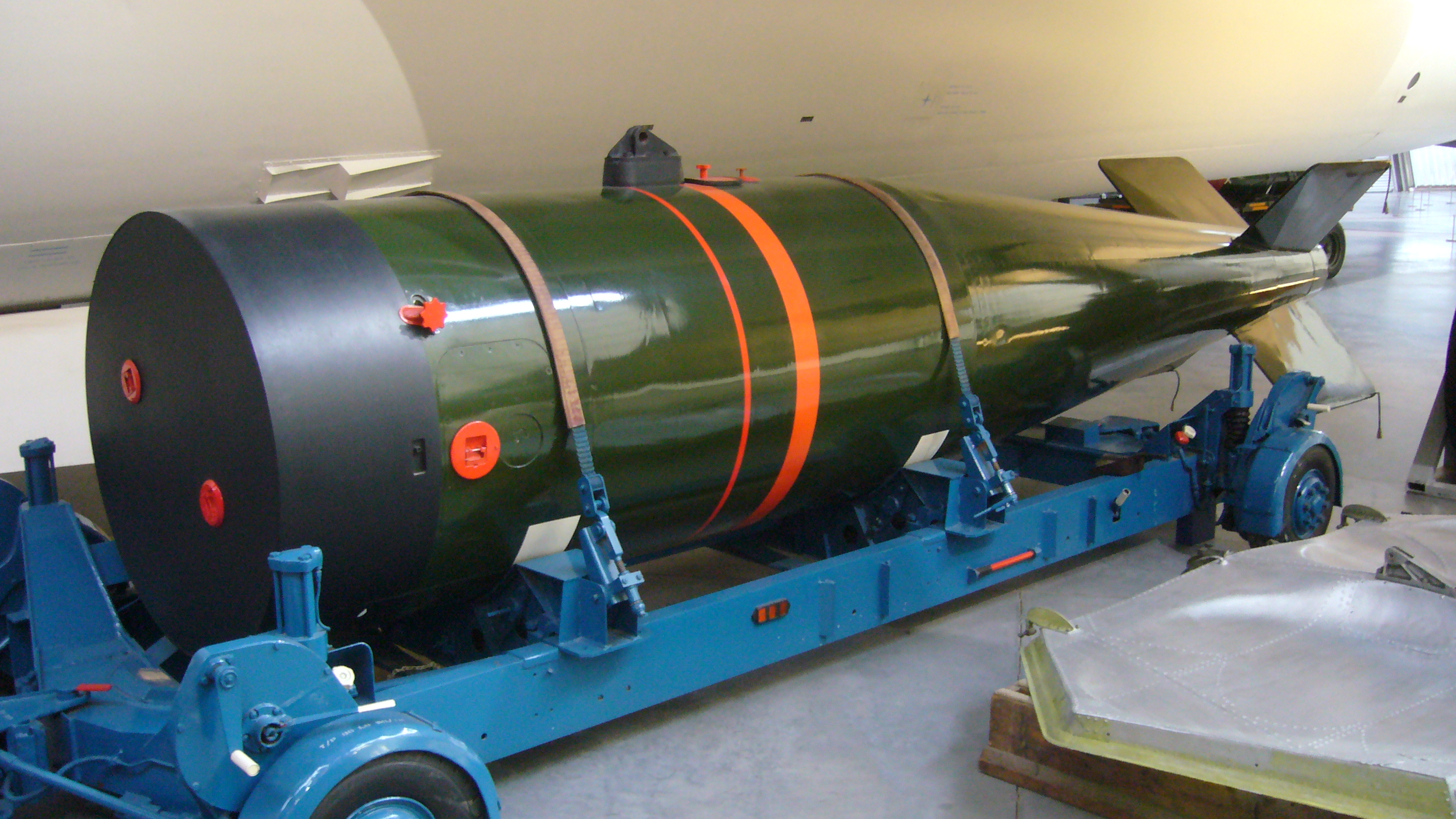
Yellow Sun, Britain's first production thermonuclear bomb

The MDA made fully developed and tested American designs available quickly and cheaply. The first of these was the Mark 28, which was "Anglicised" and manufactured in the UK as Red Snow. Exact copies of American designs were not pursued; the high explosive used in American warheads was more sensitive than British high explosive, and had caused fatal accidents in the US. Its use was not contemplated in the UK after an accident at Aldermaston on 28 February 1959 when two men were killed after a piece of British high explosive fell from a lorry. British high explosive was also bulkier, so a redesign was required.

Red Snow was far more economical in its use of fissile material than the Green Grass warhead in the Yellow Sun Mk.1 bomb, Britain's first production hydrogen bomb. A Yellow Sun Mk.2 with Red Snow, therefore, cost £500,000 compared to £1.2 million for the Mk.1. RAF Bomber Command wanted Violet Club replaced as soon as possible, so 37 Yellow Sun Mk.1s were delivered by the end of 1959. Deliveries of the Yellow Sun Mk.2 commenced in January 1961, and 43 were delivered by the end of the year. In November 1958. Red Snow also replaced Green Grass as the warhead in the Blue Steel stand-off missile.

The kiloton Red Beard was developed for use by the Canberras and the Royal Navy's Fleet Air Arm. Technical problems delayed its introduction into service, but over 100 were delivered by the end of 1961. Up to 48 Red Beards were secretly stowed in a highly secured weapons storage facility at RAF Tengah in Singapore between 1962 and 1971 for possible use by V bombers and for Britain's military commitment to SEATO.

The availability of US weapons and designs under the MDA led to the cancellation of several research projects. Indigo Hammer and the smaller Pixie were warheads intended for use with the Red Duster and Seaslug surface-to-air missiles; a British version of the US W44 was chosen instead. Blue Peacock, a 16,000-pound (7,300 kg) atomic demolition munition (ADMs) based on Blue Danube, was cancelled in 1958 in favour of the lighter Violet Mist, based on Red Beard. The development of the even smaller and lighter US ADMs led to its cancellation as well in 1961. The US Medium Atomic Demolition Munition with the W45 was acquired instead. Yellow Anvil was a British artillery warhead that was cancelled in 1958.

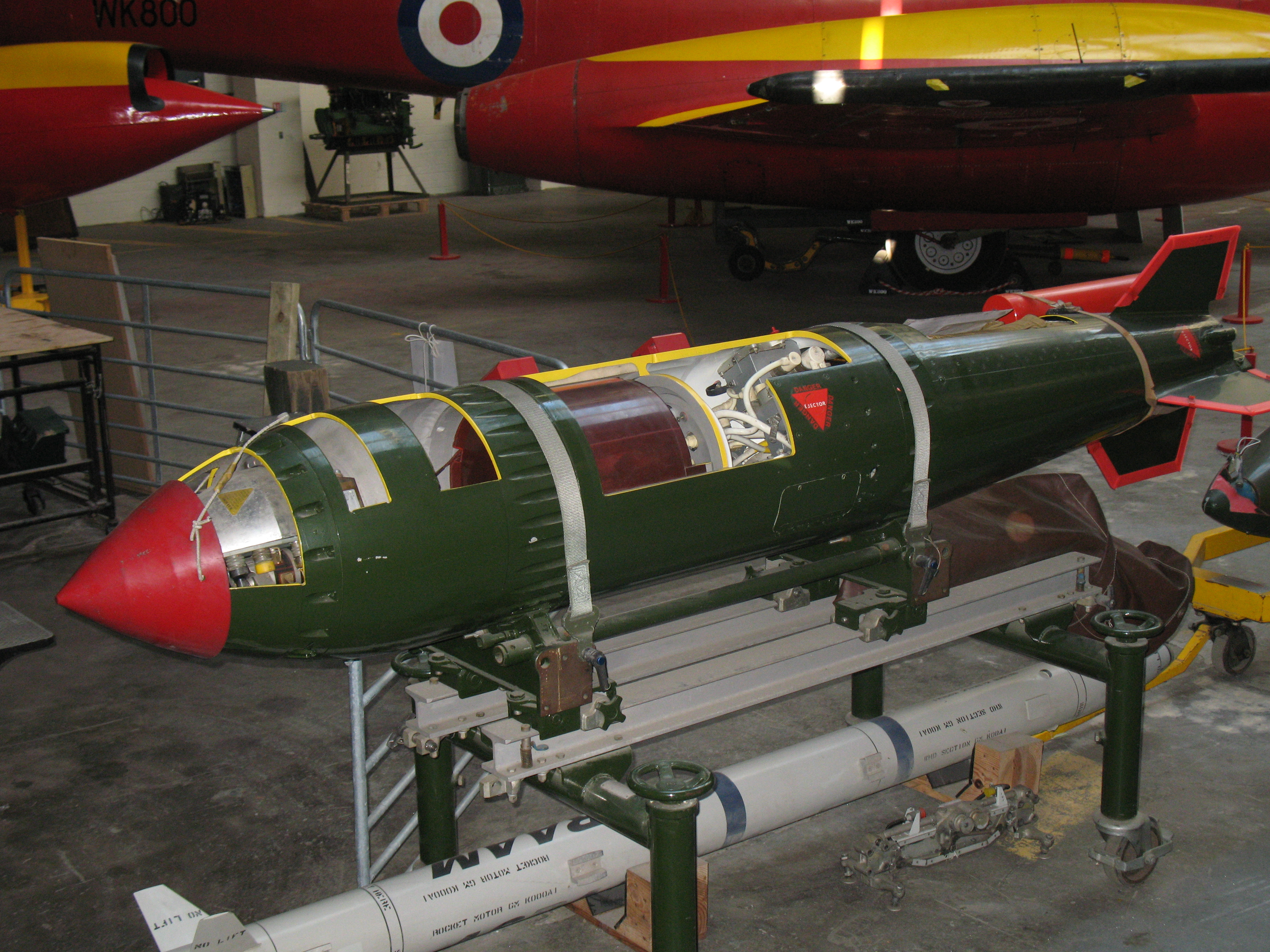
Rare WE.177A sectioned instructional example of an operational round

In 1960, the government decided to cancel the Blue Streak missile based on the Chiefs of Staff's conclusion that it was too vulnerable to attack and thus was only useful for a first strike, and decided to purchase the American air-launched Skybolt missile instead. Macmillan met with Eisenhower in March 1960, and secured permission to buy Skybolt without strings attached. In return, the Americans were given permission to base the US Navy's Polaris-equipped ballistic missile submarines at Holy Loch in Scotland.

The Americans initially intended to pair Skybolt with the W47 warhead, an innovative light-weight design from the Lawrence Radiation Laboratory developed for Polaris. The British wanted to use Red Snow, partly for safety reasons and partly because it was not certain that the advanced M47 design would be made available without strings attached. The technical problem was that Red Snow was 1,000 pounds (450 kg) heavier, and therefore the range of the Skybolt would be reduced from 1,000 to 650 miles (1,610 to 1,050 km). A megaton design known as RE.179 based on the W49 warhead used in American ICBMs was developed for Skybolt.

At the same time, work was in progress on a Red Beard replacement for use with the RAF's BAC TSR-2 and the Royal Navy's Blackburn Buccaneer. Ultimately, a warhead was produced in two variants: the high-yield (300 to 450 kilotonnes of TNT (1,300 to 1,900 TJ)) WE.177B and the low-yield (0.5 or 10 kilotonnes of TNT (2.1 or 41.8 TJ)) WE.177A as a Red Beard replacement, and for use in depth charges and anti-submarine missiles. WE.177 was later adapted for use with Polaris, and would become the longest-serving British nuclear weapon.

The deployment of ships carrying nuclear depth bombs caused complications during the Falklands War, and in the aftermath of that war it was decided to stockpile them ashore in peacetime. When the US withdrew its theatre nuclear weapons from Europe, the British government followed suit. The nuclear depth bombs were withdrawn from service in 1992, followed by the WE.177 free-fall bombs on 31 March 1998, and all were dismantled by the end of August.

==== Research and production facilities ====
The Atomic Weapons Establishment (AWE), Aldermaston, formerly the Atomic Weapons Research Establishment (AWRE), is situated on a 750-acre (300 ha) site near Reading in Berkshire. It was built on the site of the former RAF Aldermaston, which was converted to nuclear weapons research, design and development establishment, and opened on 1 April 1950. In 1954, the AWRE took control of the nearby 225-acre (91 ha) ROF Burghfield, where warheads were assembled, and the test ranges at Foulness and Orford Ness. Components for nuclear weapons were also produced at the former ROF Cardiff site.

The Atomic Weapons Research Establishment became part of the United Kingdom Atomic Energy Authority on 1 January 1955. The last trials at Orford Ness were conducted on 9 June 1971, and the site was closed on 1 October 1971. Cardiff closed in 1997, and Foulness by the end of that year. In 1989, the government announced its intention to find a private company to run AWE, with the government retaining ownership of the site and control of AWE though a golden share arrangement. In 1993, the contract was awarded to a consortium of Hunting Engineering, Brown and Root and AEA Technology. In 1999, the contract was transferred to a consortium of BNFL, Lockheed Martin and Serco. In 2008, the British government sold the BNFL share to Jacobs Engineering Group.

==== Polaris ====
The Kennedy administration cancelled Skybolt in December 1962 because the United States Secretary of Defense, Robert McNamara, determined that other delivery systems were progressing better than expected, and a further expensive system was surplus to US requirements. In London, over one hundred Conservative members of Parliament, nearly one third of the parliamentary party, signed a motion urging Macmillan to ensure that Britain remained an independent nuclear power.

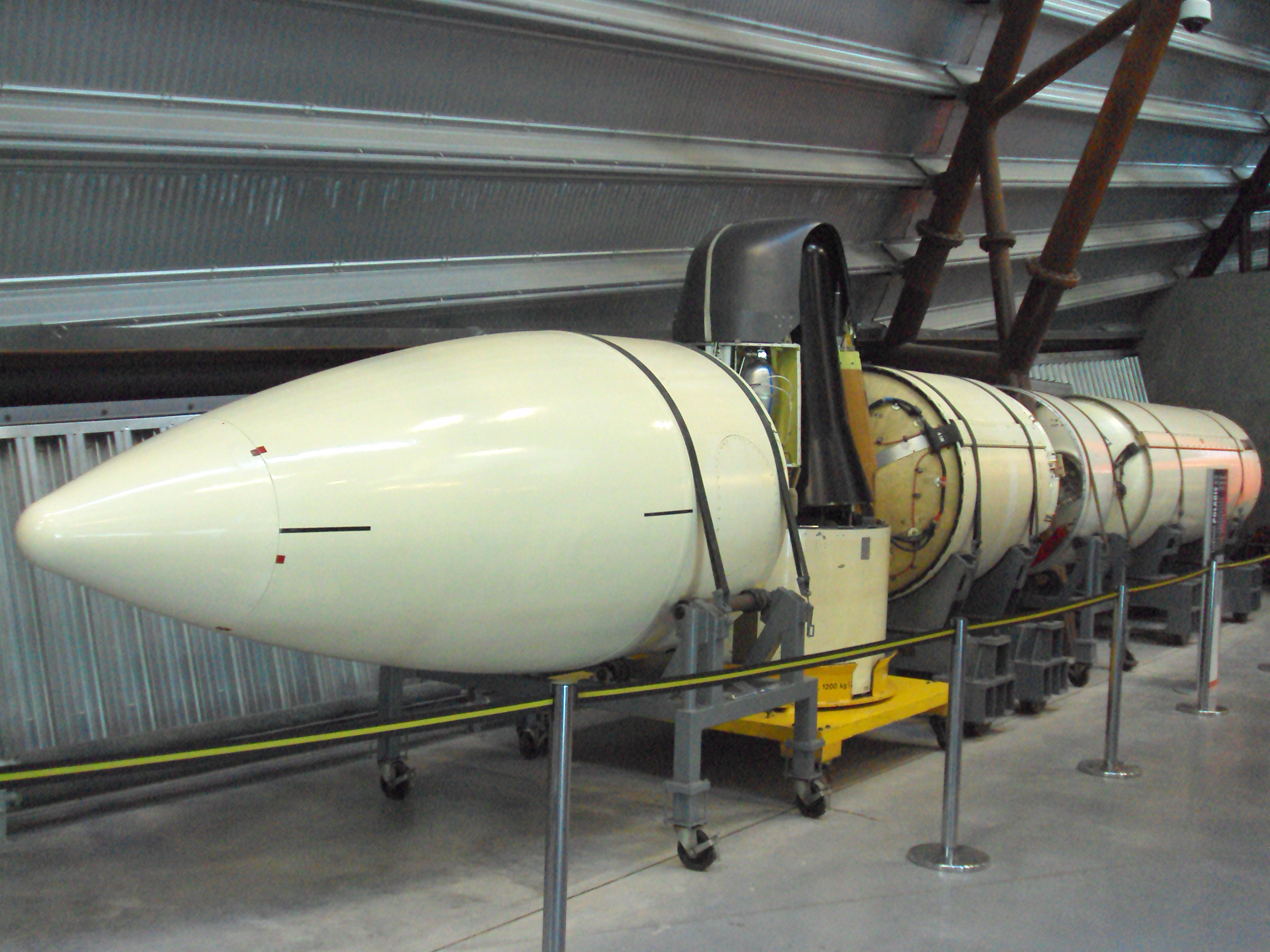
Polaris missile at the Royal Air Force Museum Midlands with Chevaline (centre, on yellow trolley)

Macmillan met with President John F. Kennedy and brokered the Nassau Agreement. Macmillan rejected offers of other systems, and insisted that the UK needed to purchase Polaris submarine-launched ballistic missiles. These represented more advanced technology than Skybolt, and the US was not inclined to provide them except as part of a Multilateral Force within the North Atlantic Treaty Organization (NATO). In the end, Kennedy did not wish to see Macmillan's government collapse, which would imperil Britain's entry into the European Economic Community (EEC), so a face-saving compromise was reached: the US agreed to provide the UK with Polaris missiles, which would be assigned to NATO, and could be used independently only when "supreme national interests" intervened.

The Polaris Sales Agreement was signed on 6 April 1963. The UK retained its deterrent force, although its control passed from the RAF to the Royal Navy. The Polaris missiles were equipped with British warheads. A base was developed for the Polaris submarines at Faslane on the Firth of Clyde, not far from the US Navy's base at Holy Loch. It was served by a weapons store at nearby Coulport. The first of four Polaris submarines, HMS Resolution was launched in September 1966, and commenced its first deterrent patrol in June 1968. The annual running costs of the Polaris boats came to around two per cent of the defence budget, and they came to be seen as a credible deterrent that enhanced Britain's international status. British politicians did not like to talk about "dependence" on the United States, preferring to describe the Special Relationship as one of "interdependence".

Polaris had not been designed to penetrate anti-ballistic missile (ABM) defences, but the Royal Navy had to ensure that its small Polaris force operating alone, and often with only one submarine on patrol, could penetrate the ABM screen around Moscow. The Wilson government publicly ruled out the purchase of Poseidon missiles in June 1967, and without such a commitment, the Americans were unwilling to share information about warhead vulnerability. The result was Chevaline, an Improved Front End (IFE) that replaced one of the three warheads with multiple decoys and other defensive countermeasures, in what was known as a Penetration Aid Carrier (PAC). It was the most technically complex defence project ever undertaken in the United Kingdom. Chevaline's existence, along with its formerly secret codename, was revealed by the Secretary of State for Defence, Francis Pym, during a debate in the House of Commons on 24 January 1980. By this time the project had gone on for a decade. The final cost reached £1,025 million.

==== Trident ====
In 1982, the Thatcher government announced its decision to purchase 65 American Trident II D-5 missiles. Four Vanguard-class submarines were designed and built. Trident missiles had multiple independently targetable re-entry vehicle (MIRV) capability, which was needed to overcome the Soviet ABM defences. The missiles have a range of 12,000 kilometres (7,500 mi).

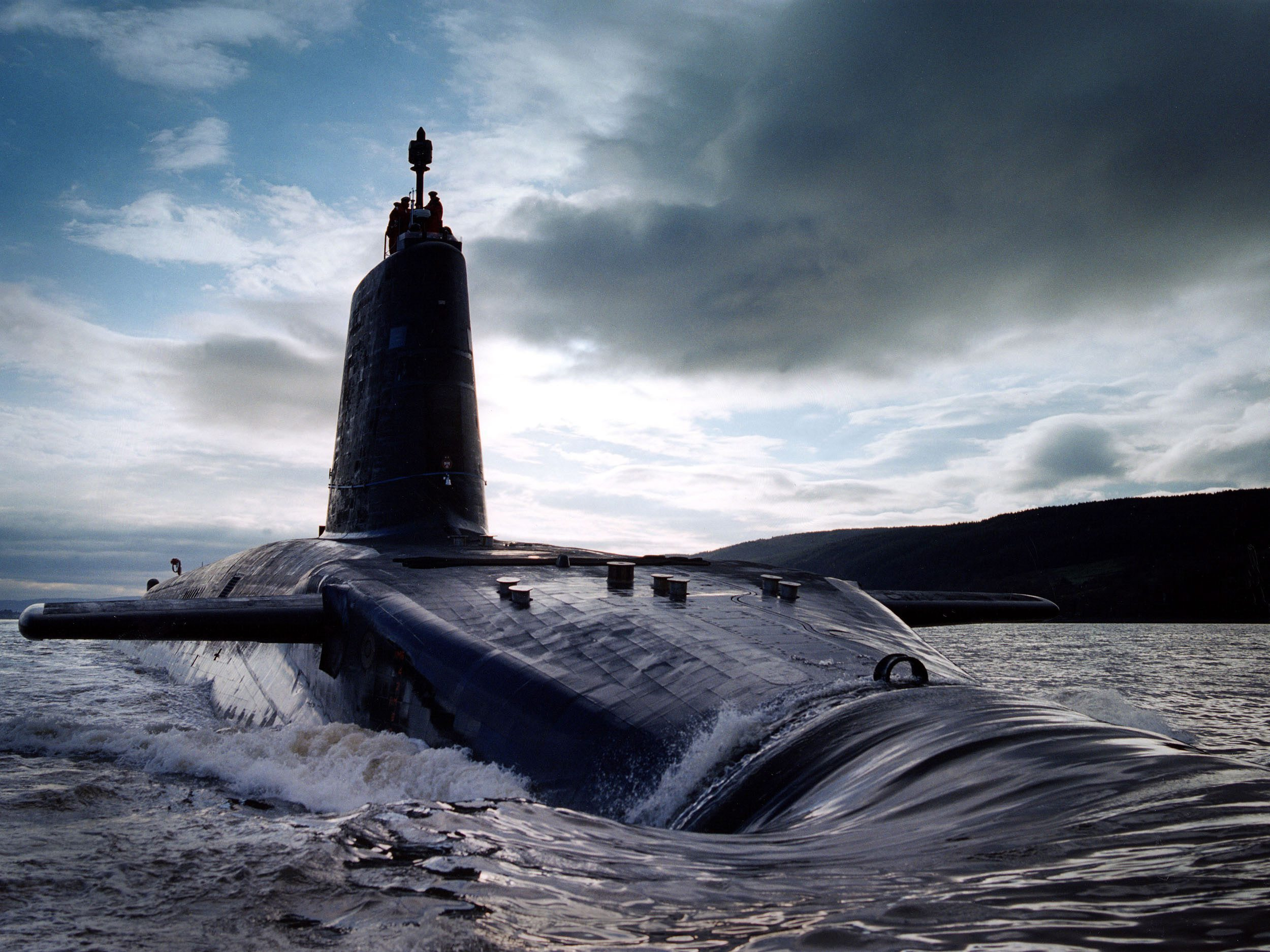
HMS Victorious, one of four Vanguard class ballistic missile submarines of the Royal Navy, departs HMNB Clyde

Each submarine can carry up to sixteen missiles, each of which can have up to eight warheads. However, when the decision to purchase Trident II was announced, it was stressed that British Trident boats would carry no more than 128 warheads—the same number as Polaris. In November 1993, the Secretary of State for Defence, Malcolm Rifkind, announced that each boat would deploy no more than 96 warheads. In 2010, this was reduced to a maximum of forty warheads, split between eight missiles. The missiles are part of a shared pool of weapons based at Naval Submarine Base Kings Bay in the United States, and are leased from the US. The US maintains and supports the missiles, while the UK manufactures its own submarines and warheads. The warheads and missiles are mated in the UK. The missiles and submarines require regular maintenance at Kings Bay.

The first Trident boat, HMS Vanguard, collected a full load of 16 missiles in 1994, but the second, HMS Victorious drew only 12 in 1995, and the third, HMS Vigilant, 14 in 1997, leaving the remaining missile tubes empty. Although the UK designed, manufactured and owns the warheads, there is evidence that the warhead design is similar to, or even based on, the US W76 warhead fitted in some US Navy Trident missiles, with design data being supplied by the United States through the MDA.

Since 1969, the United Kingdom has always had at least one ballistic-missile submarine on patrol, giving it a nuclear deterrent that is, what the Defence Council described in 1980 as, "effectively invulnerable to pre-emptive attack". In the Strategic Defence Review published in July 1998, the government stated that once the Vanguard submarines became fully operational (the fourth and final one, HMS Vengeance, entered service on 27 November 1999), it would "maintain a stockpile of fewer than 200 operationally available warheads". As of 2016, the UK had a stockpile of 215 warheads, of which 120 were operational. The 2010 Strategic Defence and Security Review reduced the number of warheads and missiles for the ballistic missile submarine on patrol to forty and eight respectively. Nuclear warheads from the Trident missiles are transported by road convoy several times a year from Coulport to Burghfield for refurbishment. Between 2000 and 2016, there were 180 incidents involving the vehicles, ranging from minor traffic accidents to a sudden total loss of power in one of the 44-tonne lorries that halted a convoy and caused a double lane closure and a tailback on the M6 motorway. The accidents have been more frequent in recent years.

The Trident system cost £12.6 billion to build (at 1996 prices) and £280m a year to maintain. Options for replacing Trident ranged from £5 billion for the missiles alone to £20 to £30 billion for missiles, submarines and research facilities. At a minimum, for the system to continue after around 2020, the missiles would need to be replaced. By 2016, the price of replacement of submarine had risen to £31 billion and it was estimated by Ministry of Defence that the cost of Trident replacement programme for 30 years would be £167 billion. The UK is the only one of the nine nuclear-armed countries to use exclusively sea-launched nuclear weapons.

==== Trident renewal ====
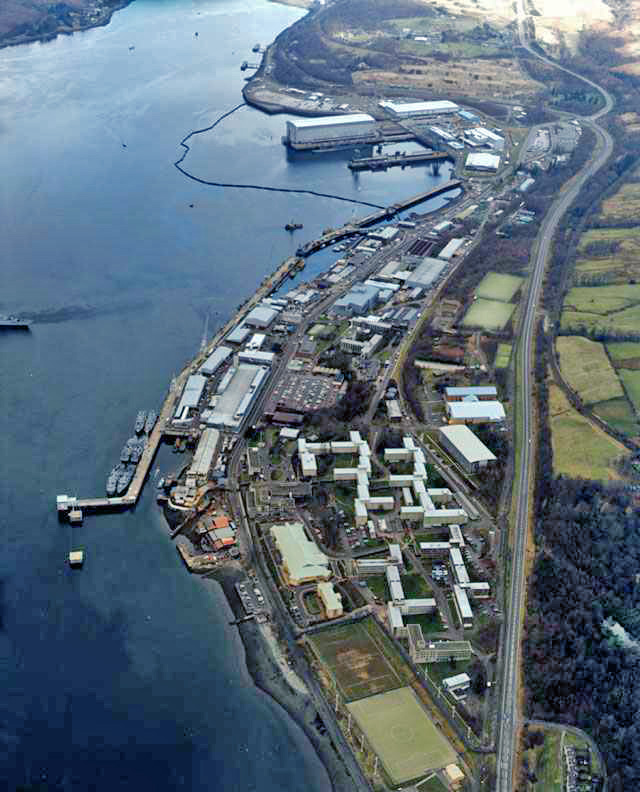
Faslane Naval Base, home of the Vanguard-class submarines which carry the UK's nuclear arsenal

With the tactical nuclear weapons having been withdrawn from service, Trident was the UK's only remaining nuclear weapons system. By this time, possession of nuclear weapons had become an important part of Britain's national identity. Not renewing Trident meant that Britain would become a non-nuclear power and strike at Britain's status as a great power. A decision on the renewal of Trident was made on 4 December 2006. Prime Minister Tony Blair told MPs it would be "unwise and dangerous" for the UK to give up its nuclear weapons. He outlined plans to spend up to £20bn on a new generation of ballistic missile submarines. The new boats would continue to carry the Trident II D-5 missiles, but submarine numbers might be cut from four to three, and the number of nuclear warheads would reduced by 20% to 160. He said although the Cold War had ended, the UK needed nuclear weapons, as no-one could be sure another nuclear threat would not emerge in the future.

The 2010 coalition government agreed "that the renewal of Trident should be scrutinised to ensure value for money. Liberal Democrats will continue to make the case for alternatives." Research and development work continued, but the final decision to proceed with building a replacement was scheduled for 2016, after the next election. There was already some urgency to move ahead because some experts predicted it could take 17 years to develop the replacement for the Vanguard-class submarines. The vote in the House of Commons on whether to replace the existing four Vanguard-class submarines was held on 18 July 2016. The Trident renewal programme motion passed with a significant majority with 472 MPs voting in favour and 117 against. The Leader of the Opposition, Jeremy Corbyn, and 47 other Labour MPs had voted against it; 41 did not vote but 140 Labour votes were cast in favour of the motion. The Successor class was officially named the Dreadnought class on 21 October 2016. The four new Dreadnought submarines were expected to come into operation in the early 2030s, with the programme lasting until at least the 2060s.

The government released a written statement on 25 February 2020, outlining that the UK nuclear warheads will be replaced and will match the US Trident II SLBM and related systems. The commander of the US Strategic Command, Admiral Charles A. Richard, told a US Senate hearing that the UK was already working to replace its warheads. The new UK warhead, Astraea, is planned to fit inside the future US Mk7 aeroshell that would also house the future US W93 warhead. It would be the first UK-designed warhead in thirty years, since the Holbrook, an Anglicised version of the US W76. However, the US Congress was reluctant to authorise the US$32 million in funding for the first phase of design of the new aeroshell. Meanwhile, construction of the £634 million Pegasus enriched uranium facility was suspended in 2018, the £1,806 million Mensa warhead assembly facility was still under construction, and the proposed Hydrus facility for hydrodynamic weapons testing was cancelled in favour of using the French Teutates-Epur facility in Valduc.

== Nuclear tests ==
The UK's first nuclear test, Operation Hurricane, was in the Montebello Islands of Western Australia. It was followed by the first nuclear tests on the Australian mainland, which were conducted at Emu Field in the Great Victoria Desert in South Australia as part of Operation Totem on 14 and 26 October 1953. Two further tests were held on the Montebello Islands as part of Operation Mosaic on 6 May and 19 June 1956. In the 1980s there emerged a claim that the second Mosaic test was of a significantly higher explosive yield than suggested by available figures—98 kilotonnes of TNT (410 TJ) as compared to the official figure of 60 kilotonnes of TNT (250 TJ)—but this claim does not stand up to scrutiny.

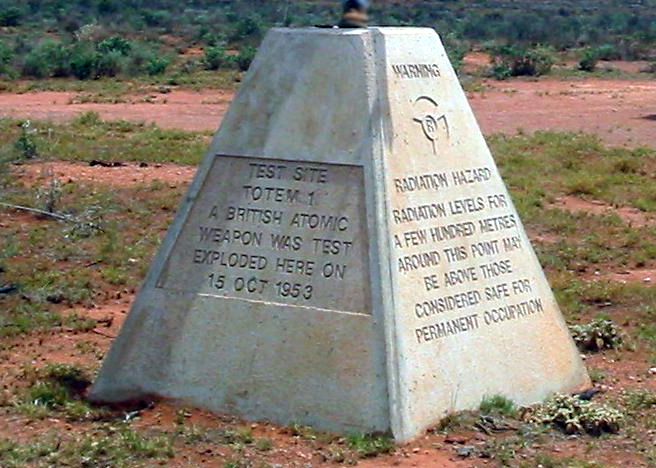
Site of Totem 1, the first nuclear test on the Australian mainland

The British government requested a permanent test facility on 30 October 1953. Due to concerns about nuclear fallout from the previous tests at Emu Field and the site's inadequate infrastructure and water supply, the recently surveyed site at Maralinga in South Australia was selected for this purpose. The new site was announced in May 1955. It was developed as a joint, co-funded facility between the British and Australian governments. Seven British nuclear tests at Maralinga were conducted between 27 September 1956 and 9 October 1957.

In addition to the major tests involving explosions, many subcritical minor trials were also carried out between June 1955 and April 1963. While the major tests had been carried out with some publicity, the minor tests were carried out in absolute secrecy. The "Kitten" tests evaluated bomb components, while "Tims" and "Rats" were early subcritical hydronuclear tests. The "Vixen" tests involved safety testing of nuclear weapons—assuring that the core would not accidentally undergo criticality in the event of a fire or crash. These minor tests left a legacy of radioactive contamination at Maralinga.

The Australian government prohibited hydrogen bomb tests in Australia, so Britain had to look for another test site for its hydrogen bombs. The first British hydrogen bombs were tested during Operation Grapple at Malden Island and Christmas Island in the Pacific Ocean. Nine tests were conducted there in 1957, 1958 and 1959, ultimately demonstrating that the UK had developed expertise in thermonuclear weapons.

Beginning in December 1962, the UK conducted 24 tests at the Nevada Test Site in the United States. The final test was the Julin Bristol shot which took place on 26 November 1991. British nuclear testing was abruptly halted by President George H. W. Bush in October 1992. Because Britain did not test as often as the United States for financial and political reasons, and did not have the Americans' state-of-the-art computer facilities, British weapons design depended more on theoretical understanding, with potential for both greater advances and greater risks between tests.

The United Kingdom, along with the United States and the Soviet Union, signed the Partial Test Ban Treaty, which restricted it to underground nuclear tests by outlawing testing in the atmosphere, underwater, or in outer space, on 5 August 1963. The UK signed the Comprehensive Test Ban Treaty, ending all nuclear testing, on 24 September 1996, and ratified it on 6 April 1998, having passed the necessary legislation on 18 March 1998 as the Nuclear Explosions (Prohibition and Inspections) Act 1998. The UK and France are the only two nuclear-armed countries that have ratified the Comprehensive Nuclear-Test-Ban Treaty, jointly doing so on 6 April 1998. Subcritical nuclear tests continued to occur, most notably the Etna test in February 2002, and the Krakatau test in February 2006.

Altogether forty-five nuclear tests were carried out by the United Kingdom between 3 October 1952 to 26 November 1991 at the Montebello Islands, Emu Field and Maralinga in Australia, on Christmas and Malden Islands in Kiribati, and at the Nevada Test Site in the United States. The 45 tests included 21 tests carried out in the atmosphere.

United Kingdom's nuclear testing series summary
Series	Years	Location	Tests	Yield range (kilotons)	Total yield (kilotons)	Notes	References
Hurricane	1952	Trimouille Island, Montebello Islands, Western Australia	1	25	25	First British nuclear test.	
Totem	1953	Emu Field, South Australia	2	8 to 10	18		
Mosaic	1956	Montebello Islands, Western Australia	2	15 to 60	75		
Buffalo	1956	Maralinga, South Australia	4	2 to 15	30		
Antler	1957	Maralinga, South Australia	3	1 to 27	34		
Grapple	1957–1958	(Gilbert and Ellice Islands) Kiritimati and Malden Island, Kiribati	9	24 to 3,000	7,869	First scalable thermonuclear test.	
NTS series	1961–1991	Nevada Test Site, Nevada, United States	24	0 to 140	1,232		
Totals	1952–1991		45	0 to 3,000	9,282	Total country yield is 1.7% of all nuclear testing.	

== Nuclear defence ==
Britain was extremely vulnerable to nuclear weapons. The 1955 Strath Committee grimly estimated that an attack on the UK with just ten 10-megaton weapons would kill 12 million people and seriously injure another 4 million even before the country was blanketed with radioactive fallout.

=== Warning systems ===
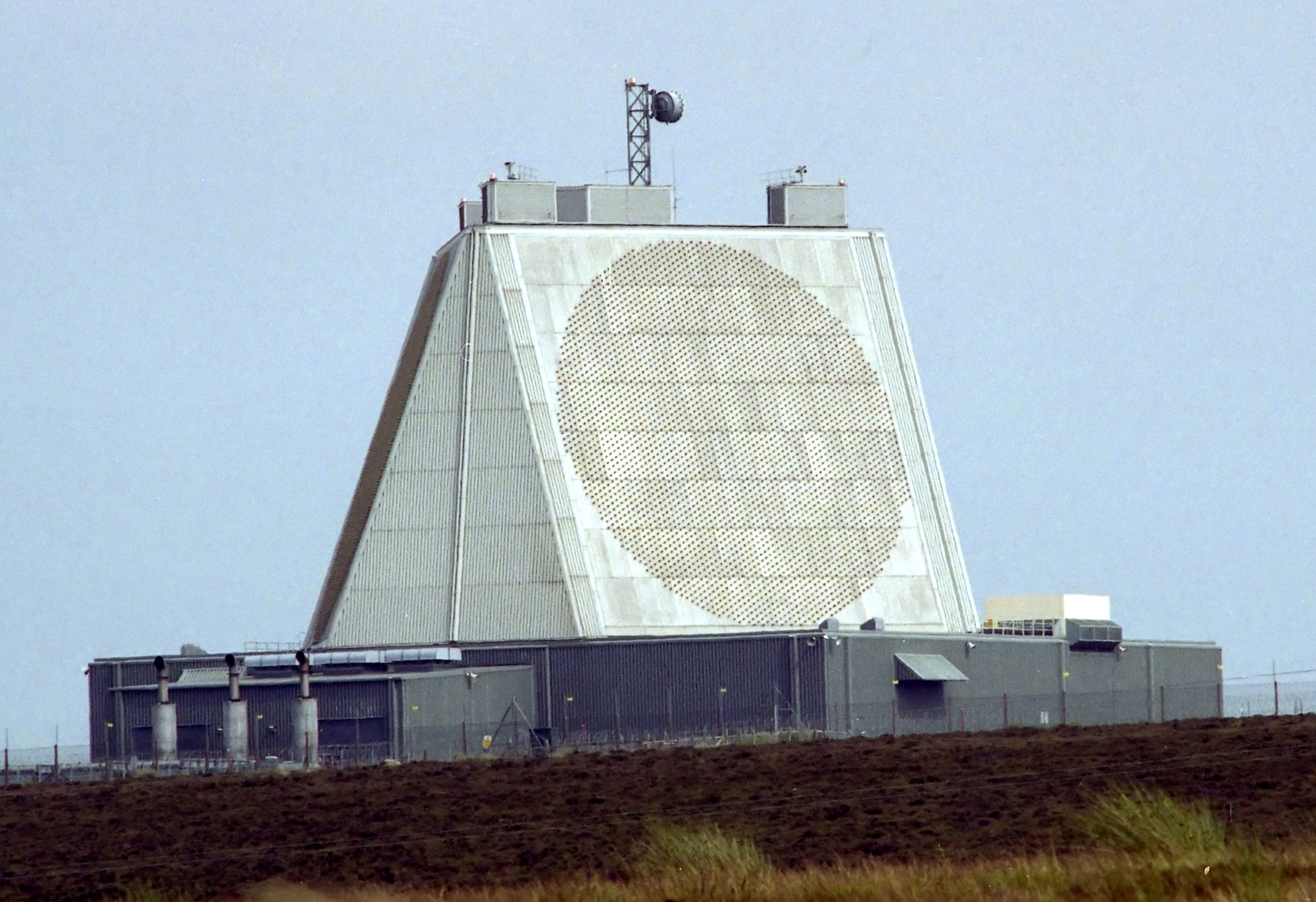
This solid-state phased array radar at RAF Fylingdales in North Yorkshire is a UK-controlled early warning station and part of the American-controlled Ballistic Missile Early Warning System.

The UK has relied on the Ballistic Missile Early Warning System (BMEWS) and, in later years, Defense Support Program (DSP) satellites for warning of a nuclear attack. Both of these systems are owned and controlled by the United States, although the UK has joint control over UK-based systems. One of the four component radars for the BMEWS is based at RAF Fylingdales in North Yorkshire.

In 2003, the UK government stated that it would consent to a request from the US to upgrade the radar at Fylingdales for use in the US National Missile Defense system, but missile defence was not a significant political issue within the UK. The ballistic missile threat was perceived to be less severe, and consequently less of a priority, than other threats to its security. Fylingdales was enhanced to an Upgraded Early Warning Radar (UEWR) in 2008, and became part of the United States national missile defense system in 2011.

=== Attack scenarios ===
During the Cold War, a significant effort by government and academia was made to assess the effects of a nuclear attack on the UK.

A list of 106 projected targets, signed by the air commodore serving as Secretary to the Chiefs of Staff, was compiled in 1972.

There were four major exercises:

- Exercise Inside Right took place in 1975.
- Exercise Scrum Half was conducted in 1978.
- Exercise Square Leg was conducted in 1980. The scenario involved around 130 warheads with a total yield of 205 megatons (69 ground burst, 62 air burst) with an average of 1.5 megatons per bomb. The exercise was criticised as unrealistic as an actual exchange may be much larger or smaller, and did not include targets in Inner London such as Whitehall. Even so, the effect of the limited attack in Square Leg was estimated to be 29 million dead (53 per cent of the population) and 6.4 million seriously injured.
- Exercise Hard Rock was a combined communications and civil defence exercise planned for September and October 1982. It assumed a conventional war in Europe lasting two to three days, during which the UK would be attacked with conventional weapons, then a limited nuclear exchange, with 54 nuclear warheads used against military targets in the UK. 250,000 people protested against the exercise and 24 councils refused to participate. The limited scenario still assumed casualties of 7.9 million dead and 5 million injured. The scenario was ridiculed by the Campaign for Nuclear Disarmament and the exercise was postponed indefinitely. The New Statesman later claimed the Ministry of Defence insisted on having a veto over proposed targets in the exercise and several were removed to make them politically more acceptable; for example, the nuclear submarine base at Faslane was removed from the target list.

=== Civil defence ===
Successive governments developed civil defence programmes aimed to prepare civilian and local government infrastructure for a nuclear strike on the UK. A series of seven Civil Defence Bulletin films were produced in 1964, and in the 1980s the most famous such programme was probably the series of booklets and public information films entitled Protect and Survive. The booklet contained information on building a nuclear refuge within a so-called "fall-out room" at home, sanitation, limiting fire hazards, and descriptions of the audio signals for attack warning, fall-out warning and all clear. It was anticipated that families might need to stay in their fall-out room for up to 14 days after an attack almost without leaving it at all. The government also prepared a recorded announcement which was to have been broadcast by the BBC if a nuclear attack ever did occur. Sirens left over from the London Blitz during World War II were also to be used to warn the public. The system was mostly dismantled in 1992.

== Politics ==
=== Anti-nuclear movement ===
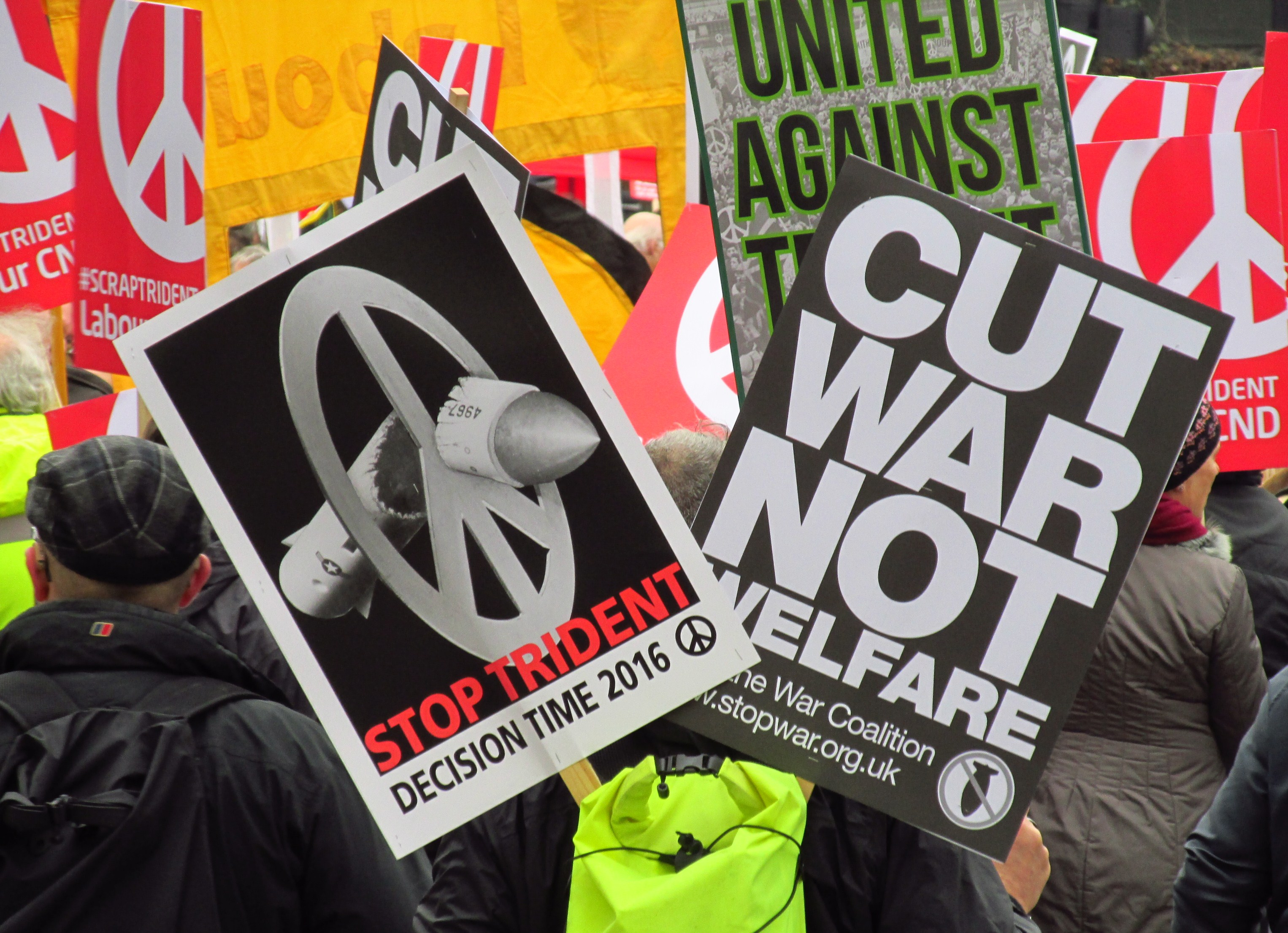
The now-familiar peace symbol was originally the Campaign for Nuclear Disarmament logo.

The anti-nuclear movement in the United Kingdom consists of groups who oppose nuclear technologies such as nuclear power and nuclear weapons. Many different groups and individuals have been involved in anti-nuclear demonstrations and protests over the years. One of the most prominent anti-nuclear groups in the UK is the Campaign for Nuclear Disarmament (CND). This national movement was founded in the late 1950s, initially in opposition to nuclear testing. It reached its peak around 1960, by which time it had evolved into a broader movement calling for Britain to unilaterally give up nuclear weapons, withdraw from NATO, and end the basing of US bombers armed with nuclear weapons in the UK.

The end of atmospheric nuclear testing, internal squabbles, and activists focusing their energies on other causes led to a rapid decline, but it revived in the early 1980s in the wake of the Thatcher government's December 1979 decision to deploy US GLCMs in the UK, and the announcement of its decision to purchase Trident in July 1980. Membership leapt from 3,000 in 1980 to 50,000 a year later, and rallies for unilateral nuclear disarmament in London in October 1981 and June 1982 attracted 250,000 marchers, the largest ever mass demonstrations in the UK up to that time.

=== End of cross-party support ===
There was little dissent in the House of Commons from the government's nuclear weapons policy; it had almost bipartisan support until 1960, with only the Liberals temporarily dissenting in 1958. Despite opposition from its left wing the Labour party supported British nuclear weapons but opposed tests, and Labour Opposition Leader Hugh Gaitskell and shadow foreign secretary Aneurin Bevan agreed with Sandys on the importance of reducing dependence on the American deterrent. Bevan told his colleagues that their demand for unilateral nuclear disarmament would send a future Labour government "naked into the conference chamber" during international negotiations.

From 1955 the government chose to emphasise the nuclear deterrent and de-emphasise conventional forces. In 1962, it stated that the forthcoming Chinese nuclear weapon was a reason for having more than one Western nuclear nation. When France developed its own nuclear weapons, British politicians contended that Europe required an independent deterrent other than that of France. The Manchester Guardian and other newspapers critical of the Conservative government supported the British deterrent, although it criticised the government for relying on bombers rather than missiles to deliver nuclear weapons. The Economist, the New Statesman, and many left-wing newspapers supported the reliance on nuclear deterrence and nuclear weapons, but in their view considered that of the United States would suffice, and that of the costs of the "nuclear umbrella" was best left to be borne by the United States alone.

Gaitskell's Labour party ceased supporting an independent deterrent in 1960 via its new "Policy for Peace", after the cancellation of Blue Streak made nuclear independence less likely. Labour also adopted a resolution favouring unilateral disarmament. Although Gaitskell opposed the resolution and it was reversed in 1961 in favour of continuing support of a general Western nuclear deterrent, the party's opposition to a British deterrent remained and became more prominent. This became a campaign issue during the 1964 general election. Alec Douglas-Home's incumbent Conservatives stated that the British independent deterrent was necessary for independence from the Americans and maintaining British world influence, and that it was "working for peace" in such cases as the passage of the Nuclear Test Ban Treaty. Led by Gaitskell's successor Harold Wilson, Labour emphasized domestic economic issues and decried the "Tory Nuclear Pretense" as neither independent nor a deterrent. The populace's greater interest in domestic over foreign policy likely contributed more to Labour's victory.

The 1982 Labour Party Conference adopted a platform calling for the removal of the GLCMs, the scrapping of Polaris and the cancellation of Trident. This was reaffirmed by the 1986 conference. While the party was given little chance of winning the 1983 election in the aftermath of the Falklands War, polls had shown Labour ahead of the Conservatives in 1986 and 1987. In the wake of Labour's unsuccessful performance in the 1987 election, the Labour Party leader, Neil Kinnock, despite his own unilateralist convictions, moved to drop the party's disarmament policy, which he saw as a contributing factor in its defeat. The party formally voted to do so in October 1989.

Faslane Peace Camp is permanently sited near Faslane naval base, and has been occupied continuously, albeit in different locations, since 12 June 1982. In 2005, there were many protests about the government's proposal to replace the ageing Trident. The largest protest had 100,000 participants and, according to polls, 59 per cent of the public opposed the replacement. In 2006, a year-long protest at Faslane aimed to blockade the base every day for a year. Over a thousand people were arrested. Pro-independence Scottish political parties—the Scottish National Party (SNP), Scottish Green Party, Scottish Socialist Party (SSP) and Solidarity—opposed the basing of the Trident system in Scotland, and supported nuclear disarmament. The Radical Independence Campaign political organisation also opposes nuclear weapons and the Trident nuclear weapons programme. Some members and ex-members of the aforementioned political parties, such as Tommy Sheridan and Lloyd Quinan, have taken part in blockades of the Faslane base. In the House of Commons vote in 2007, the majority of Scottish members of parliament voted against upgrading the system, while a substantial majority of English, Welsh and Northern Irish MPs voted in favour.

The vote on whether to order the Successor class was held on 18 July 2016 in the House of Commons; the motion passed with a significant majority, extending the programme's life until at least the 2060s. Although 48 Labour MPs voted against it, 41 did not vote, and 140 Labour votes were cast in favour of the motion.

=== Nuclear posture ===
The UK relaxed its nuclear posture after the collapse of the Soviet Union. The Labour government's 1998 Strategic Defence Review made reductions from the plans announced by the previous Conservative government:

- The stockpile of "operationally available warheads" was reduced to 225
- The final batch of missile bodies would not be purchased, limiting the fleet to 58.
- A submarine's load of warheads was reduced from 96 to 48. This reduced the explosive power of the warheads on a Vanguard class Trident submarine to "one third less than a Polaris submarine armed with Chevaline". However, 48 warheads per Trident submarine represents a 50% increase on the 32 warheads per submarine of Chevaline. Total explosive power has been in decline for decades as the accuracy of missiles has improved, therefore requiring less power to destroy each target. Trident can destroy 48 targets per submarine, as opposed to 32 targets that could be destroyed by Chevaline.
- Submarines' missiles would not be targeted, but rather at several days "notice to fire".
- Although one submarine would always be on patrol it will operate on a "reduced day-to-day alert state". A major factor in maintaining a constant patrol is to avoid "misunderstanding or escalation if a Trident submarine were to sail during a period of crisis".

In April 2017 Defence Secretary Michael Fallon confirmed that the UK would use nuclear weapons in a pre-emptive nuclear strike under "the most extreme circumstances". Until 1998 the aircraft-delivered, free-fall WE.177 bombs provided a sub-strategic option in addition to their designed function as tactical battlefield weapons. With the retirement of WE.177, a sub-strategic warhead is used with some (but not all) deployed Trident missiles. The 2010 Strategic Defence and Security Review further pledged to reduce its requirement for operationally available warheads from fewer than 160 to no more than 120. In a January 2015 written statement, Defence Secretary Michael Fallon reported that "all Vanguard Class SSBNs on continuous at-sea deterrent patrol now carry 40 nuclear warheads and no more than eight operational missiles". However, on 17 March 2021, Prime Minister Boris Johnson announced that the number of nuclear warheads in the UK stockpile would be increased to 260. This reversed the long-term trend of steadily reducing the stockpile.

In June 2025, Prime Minister Keir Starmer announced the purchase of F-35A aircraft capable of deploying US nuclear weapons as part of NATO's dual capable aircraft nuclear mission, which his office said would be "the biggest strengthening of the UK's nuclear posture in a generation".

== Nuclear weapons control ==
UK nuclear command and control e.g. launch authority rests with the Prime Minister, or if unreachable a designated deputy, while it is possible the Chief of the Defence Staff holds a veto. In the event of a decapitation strike, handwritten letters of last resort from the Prime Minister are used to instruct submarine crews. UK nuclear weapons have no permissive action links or corresponding launch codes, thus submarine crews may independently launch a nuclear attack.

=== Role of the Prime Minister ===
The Prime Minister authorises the use of nuclear weapons. All former prime ministers have supported an "independent nuclear deterrent", including David Cameron. Only one, James Callaghan, has given any insight on his orders; Callaghan stated that, although in a situation where nuclear weapon use was required – and thus the whole purpose and value of the weapon as a deterrent had failed – he would have ordered use of nuclear weapons, if needed: "if we had got to that point, where it was, I felt it was necessary to do it, then I would have done it (used the weapon) ... but if I had lived after pressing that button, I could have never forgiven myself." Denis Healey, the Secretary of State for Defence and "alternate decision-taker" under Harold Wilson, said that in the event of Soviet nuclear weapons attacking the United Kingdom and the Prime Minister had been killed or incapacitated, he would not have ordered a retaliation.

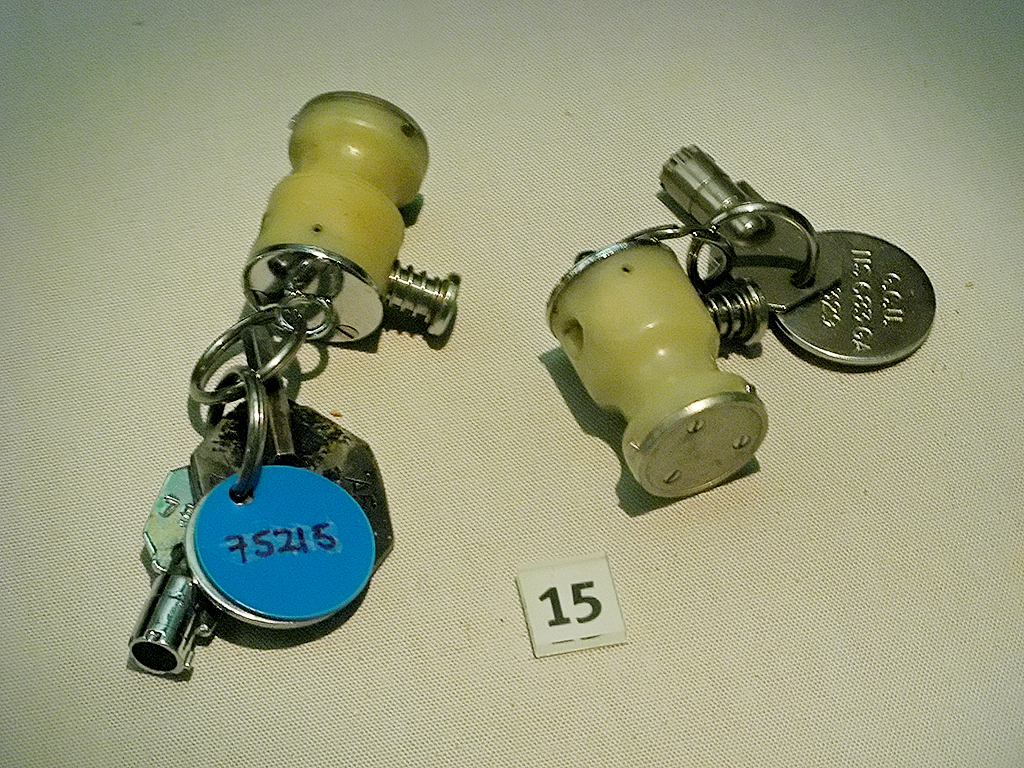
WE.177 safety and arming keys

The precise details of how a British Prime Minister would authorise a nuclear strike remain secret, although the principles of the Trident missile control system are believed to be based on the plan set up for Polaris in 1968, which has been declassified. A closed-circuit television system was set up between 10 Downing Street and the SSBN Control Officer at the Northwood Headquarters of the Royal Navy. Both the Prime Minister and the SSBN Control Officer would be able to see each other on their monitors when the command was given. If the link failed – for instance during a nuclear attack or when the Prime Minister was away from Downing Street – the Prime Minister would send an authentication code which could be verified at Northwood. The Prime Minister would then broadcast a firing order to the SSBN submarines via the Very Low Frequency radio station at Rugby. The UK has not deployed control equipment requiring codes to be sent before weapons can be used, such as the US Permissive Action Link, which if installed would preclude the possibility that military officers could launch British nuclear weapons without authorisation.

Until 1998, when it was withdrawn from service, the WE.177 bomb was armed with a standard tubular pin tumbler lock (as used on bicycle locks) and a standard Allen key was used to set yield and burst height. Currently, British Trident missile commanders are able to launch their missiles without authorisation, whereas their American counterparts cannot. At the end of the Cold War the US Fail Safe Commission recommended installing devices to prevent rogue commanders persuading their crews to launch unauthorised nuclear attacks. This was endorsed by the Nuclear Posture Review and Trident missile Coded Control Devices were fitted to all US SSBNs by 1997. These devices were designed to prevent an attack until a launch code had been sent by the Joint Chiefs of Staff on behalf of the President. The UK took a decision not to install Trident CCDs or their equivalent on the grounds that an aggressor might be able to wipe out the British chain of command before a launch order had been sent.

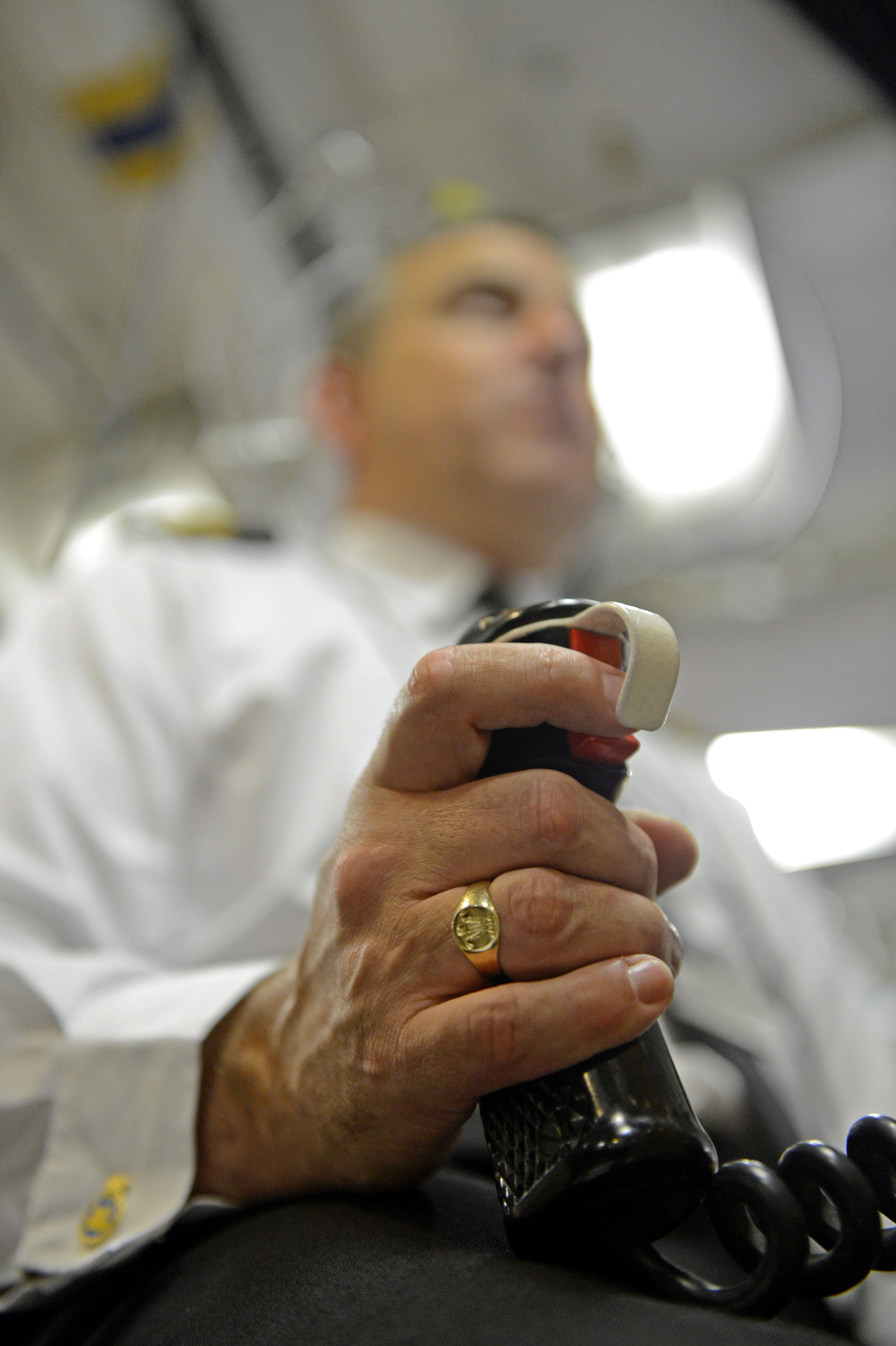
Weapons Engineer Officer's Tactical Trigger used to launch a Trident Missile. Taken in 2012 aboard HMS Vigilant during a test launch of an unarmed Trident ballistic missile at sea.

=== Role of the Chief of the Defence Staff ===
There appears to be a debate over whether concurrence of the Chief of the Defence Staff is also required to launch a nuclear attack. In December 2008, BBC Radio 4 made a programme titled The Human Button, providing new information on the manner in which the United Kingdom could launch its nuclear weapons, particularly relating to safeguards against a rogue launch. The former Chief of the Defence Staff and Chief of the General Staff, General Lord Guthrie of Craigiebank, explained that the highest level of safeguard was against a prime minister ordering a launch without due cause. The constitutional structure of the United Kingdom provided some protection against such an occurrence, as while the Prime Minister is the chief executive and so practically commands the armed services, the formal commander-in-chief is the monarch, to whom the chief of the defence staff could appeal: "the chief of the defence staff, if he really did think the prime minister had gone mad, would make quite sure that that order was not obeyed ... You have to remember that actually prime ministers give direction, they tell the chief of the defence staff what they want, but it's not prime ministers who actually tell a sailor to press a button in the middle of the Atlantic. The armed forces are loyal, and we live in a democracy, but actually their ultimate authority is the Queen."

The same interview pointed out that while the Prime Minister would have the constitutional authority to fire the Chief of the Defence Staff, he could not appoint a replacement as the position is appointed by the monarch. The programme also addressed the workings of the system; detailing that two individuals are required to authenticate each stage of the process before launching, with the submarine captain only able to access the firing trigger after two safes have been opened with keys held by the ship's executive and weapons engineering officers. Another (albeit partly challenged) explanation is that while the Prime Minister can give an authorisation, only commissioned officers of the armed forces (like the Chief of the Defence Staff) can give an order.

=== Nuclear deputies ===
The Prime Minister appoints nuclear deputies in case they are out of reach or indisposed during an emergency. Such appointments are made on a personal basis rather than according to the ministerial ranking. In 1961, the Prime Minister was advised for the first time to appoint a first deputy and second deputy to authorise nuclear retaliation if they were not immediately available.

In 1961, Harold Macmillan chose Rab Butler and Selwyn Lloyd (in that order), replacing Lloyd with Alec Douglas-Home in 1962. In 1964, Douglas-Home appointed Butler and Lloyd (though Peter Thorneycroft instead of Lloyd was considered before this) as his first and second nuclear deputies, respectively. In 1965, Wilson chose Bert Bowden as his first deputy and Denis Healey as his second deputy. Michael Stewart took over from Bowden as first deputy in 1966. Edward Heath chose Reginald Maudling, Douglas-Home and Lord Carrington as his nuclear deputies in 1970. In 1974, Wilson made Callaghan first deputy and Healey second deputy. When Callaghan became Prime Minister in 1976, he made Healey first deputy and Roy Mason second deputy. The files on who Margaret Thatcher (and subsequent premiers) appointed to the role have not yet been released. The practice of appointing nuclear deputies apparently fell out of practice between the end of the Cold War and 2001 when, following the September 11 attacks, Blair revived the practice, but Malcolm Rifkind has revealed that he was nominated by John Major in 1995 as one of the two nuclear deputies "to act on his behalf in the event of either his death or incapacity at a time of grave crisis for this country."

=== Letters of last resort ===
During the Cold War, if a nuclear attack had taken place and the Prime Minister and their deputies could not be reached, then Royal Air Force Strike Command had standing delegated authority to retaliate. Since 1972, the Prime Minister has also written four letters of last resort, one for each SSBN commander. The Prime Minister writes these letters when they take office and they set out what the commander should do in the event of a nuclear attack that kills the Prime Minister and their nuclear deputy/ies. Past options proposed to the Prime Minister have included commit the forces, do not commit the forces, make the most reasonable choice or place yourself under Allied command. This system of issuing notes containing orders in the event of the head of government's death is said to be unique to the United Kingdom (although the concept of written last orders, particularly of a ship's captain, is a naval tradition), with other nuclear powers using different procedures. The letters are destroyed unopened whenever a Prime Minister leaves office.

== Legality ==
The United Kingdom is one of the five nuclear-weapon states legally recognised as such under the Treaty on the Non-Proliferation of Nuclear Weapons (NPT). As of 2018, nine countries have nuclear weapons. After the UK government announced its plans to refurbish its Trident missiles and build new submarines to carry them, it published a white paper on The Future of the United Kingdom's Nuclear Deterrent, in which it stated that the renewal is fully compatible with the United Kingdom's treaty commitments and international law. At the start of the House of Commons debate to authorise the replacement of Trident, Margaret Beckett, the Secretary of State for Foreign and Commonwealth Affairs, stated:

Article VI of the NPT imposes an obligation on all states: "to pursue negotiations in good faith on effective measures relating to cessation of the nuclear arms race at an early date and to nuclear disarmament, and on a Treaty on general and complete disarmament". The NPT Review Conference held in 2000 agreed, by consensus, 13 practical steps towards nuclear disarmament. The UK remains committed to these steps and is making progress on them. We have been disarming. Since the Cold War ended, we have withdrawn and dismantled our tactical maritime and airborne nuclear capabilities. We have terminated our nuclear capable Lance missiles and artillery. We have the smallest nuclear capability of any recognised nuclear weapon state accounting for less than one per cent of the global inventory. And we are the only nuclear weapon state that relies on a single nuclear system.

The subsequent vote was won overwhelmingly, including unanimous support from the opposition Conservative Party. The Government's position remained that it was abiding by the NPT in renewing Trident, and Britain has the right to possess nuclear weapons, a position reiterated by Tony Blair on 21 February 2007. Only the United Kingdom has expressed its opposition to the establishment of a new legally binding treaty to prevent the threat or use of nuclear weapons against non-nuclear states, through its vote in the United Nations General Assembly in 1998.

The United Kingdom decided not to sign the UN treaty on the Prohibition of Nuclear Weapons, a binding agreement for negotiations for the total elimination of nuclear weapons, supported by more than 120 nations. None of the nine countries known or believed at the time to possess nuclear weapons supported the treaty, nor did any of the 30 countries of the NATO alliance.
