= Royal Navy Submarine Service =

One of the five fighting arms of the British Royal Navy

- Founded: 1901
- Country: United Kingdom
- Branch: Royal Navy
- Motto: "We Come Unseen"
- Equipment: 6 SSNs & 4 SSBNs
- Website: www.royalnavy.mod.uk/our-organisation/the-fighting-arms/submarine-service

Commanders
- Current commander: Commodore Benjamin S. Haskins
- Commodore-in-Chief: HRH The Prince of Wales

Insignia
- White Ensign (1901 – present)

- Naval jack

- Jolly Roger

The Royal Navy Submarine Service is one of the five fighting arms of the Royal Navy. It is sometimes known as the Silent Service, as submarines are generally required to operate undetected.

The service operates six fleet submarines (SSNs), of the Astute class (with one further Astute-class boat currently under construction), and four ballistic missile submarines (SSBN), of the Vanguard class. All of these submarines are nuclear powered.

The Royal Navy's senior submariner was for many years located at HMS Dolphin in Hampshire. It moved from Dolphin to the Northwood Headquarters in 1978. The Submarine School moved from HMS Dolphin to HMS Raleigh, but is now situated at HMNB Clyde (HMS Neptune) on the Gareloch in Scotland.

== History ==
HMS Holland 1, the first submarine to be commissioned by the Royal Navy. She can be seen at the Royal Navy Submarine Museum, Gosport.

In 1900 the Royal Navy ordered five submarines from Vickers Shipbuilding and Engineering of Barrow-in-Furness, designed by Electric Boat Company. The following year the first submarine, Holland 1, was launched, and the navy recruited the first three officers for the Submarine Service, Lieutenants Stephen Bowle-Evans (N) and Forster Delafield Arnold-Forster (T), under Reginald Bacon as Inspecting Captain of Submarines, on the 20th of August 1901. They were shortly thereafter joined by Lieutenant John Alfred Moreton in early October 1901.

At the beginning of World War I it consisted of 168 officers, 1,250 ratings, and 62 submarines. During the war it was awarded five of the Royal Navy's 14 Victoria Crosses of the war, the first was to Lieutenant Norman Holbrook, commanding officer of B11, for passing through minefields to sink the Ottoman warship Mesudiye.

Late in the war, the Royal Navy introduced the large K-class submarines. In order to be fast enough to operate alongside the battlefleet, they used steam propulsion while surfaced. En route to a training exercise with the fleet in a disaster, afterwards nicknamed "the battle of May Island", two K-class submarines were sunk, with death of most of their crew, and three more and a light cruiser damaged.

=== Second World War ===
At the start of the war, the Royal Navy had 60 submarines with another nine under construction. By August 1945 a further 178 had been commissioned and 76 had been lost to all causes, the majority of the losses in the Mediterranean. In the Mediterranean (during the Siege of Malta), British U-class submarines began operations against Italy as early as January 1941. Larger submarines began operations in 1940, but after 50% losses per mission, they were withdrawn. U-class submarines operated from the Manoel Island Base known as HMS Talbot. Unfortunately no bomb-proof pens were available as the building project had been scrapped before the war, owing to cost-cutting policies. The new force was named the Tenth Submarine Flotilla and was placed under Flag Officer Submarines, Admiral Max Horton, who appointed Commander George Simpson to command the unit. Administratively, the Tenth Flotilla operated under the First Submarine Flotilla at Alexandria, itself under the admiral commanding in the Mediterranean, Andrew Cunningham. In reality, Cunningham gave Simpson and his unit a free hand. Until U-class vessels could be made available in numbers, British T-class submarines were used. They had successes, but suffered heavy losses when they began operations on 20 September 1940. Owing to the shortage of torpedoes, enemy ships could not be attacked unless the target in question was a warship, tanker or other "significant vessel". The flotilla's performance of the fleet was mixed at first. They sank 37,000 long tons (38,000 t) of Italian shipping; half by one vessel, the submarine Truant. It accounted for one Italian submarine, nine merchant vessels and one Motor Torpedo Boat (MTB). The loss of nine submarines and their trained crews and commanders was serious. Most of the losses were to mines. On 14 January 1941, U-class submarines arrived, and the submarine offensive began in earnest.

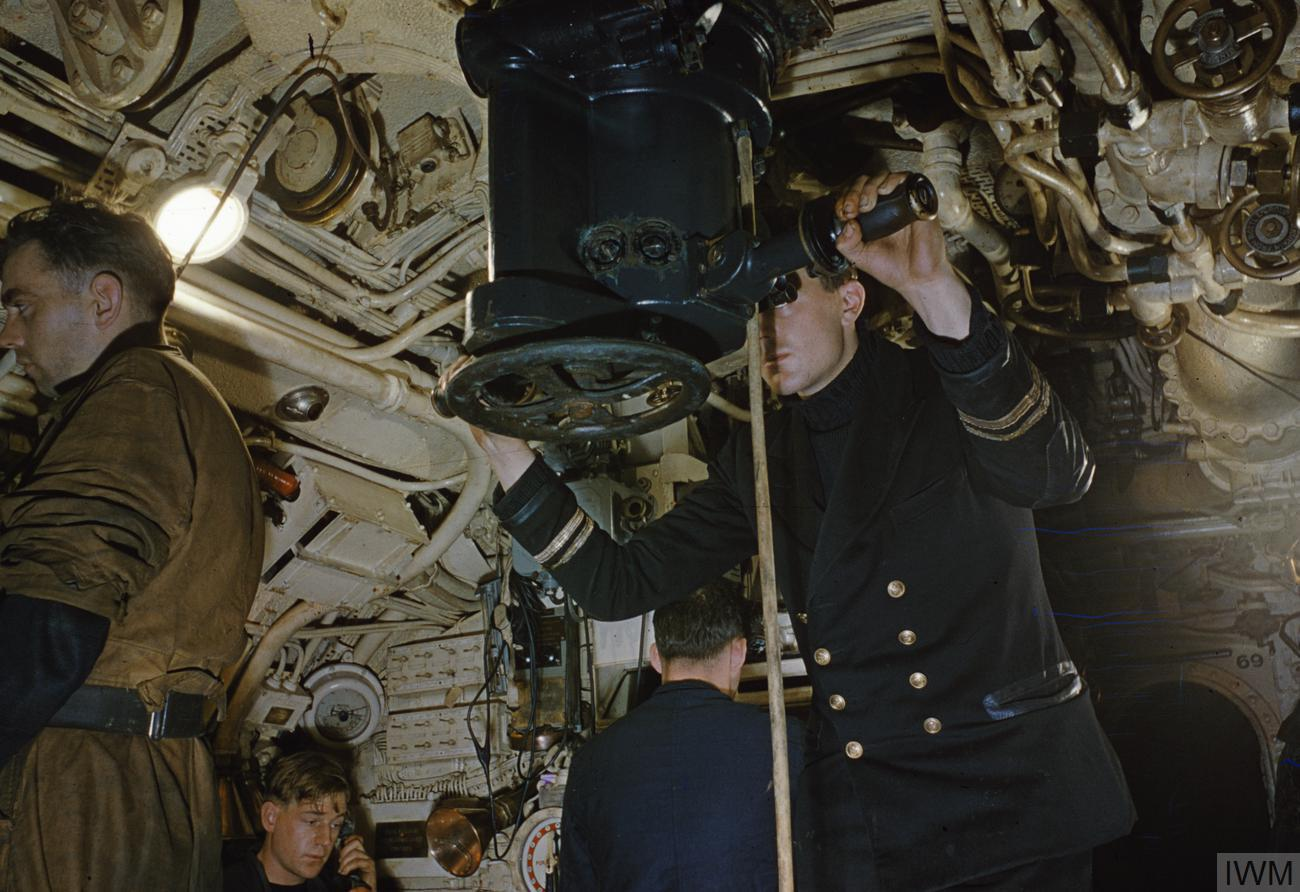
On board HMS Tribune in 1942

One of the most famous Mediterranean submarines was Upholder, commanded for its entire career by Lieutenant-Commander Malcolm Wanklyn. He received the Victoria Cross for attacking a well-defended convoy on 25 May 1941 and sinking an Italian liner, the Conte Rosso. In her 16-month operational career in the Mediterranean, before she was lost in April 1942, Upholder carried out 24 patrols and sank around 119,000 tons of Axis ships – 3 U-boats, a destroyer, 15 transport ships with possibly a cruiser and another destroyer also sunk. Upholder probably struck a mine on 13 April 1942.

On 8 September 1944, C-in-C Mediterranean ordered that the submarine base at La Maddalena be closed, and that Tenth Flotilla be disestablished and the submarines be incorporated into the First Submarine Flotilla at Malta.

=== Cold War ===
The submarine force was cut back after the end of the war. The first British nuclear-powered submarine Dreadnought was launched in 1960, based around a U.S.-built nuclear reactor. This was complemented by the Valiant class from 1966, which used a new British-built Rolls-Royce PWR1 reactor. The UK's strategic nuclear deterrent was transferred to the Royal Navy from the Royal Air Force at midnight on 30 June 1968, i.e. 1 July. The Resolution class ballistic missile submarines (SSBNs) were introduced to carry out this role under the Polaris programme from 1968. These carried US-built UGM-27 Polaris A-3 missiles and were later replaced by the Vanguard class submarines and the Trident missile system from 1994.

In 1978 the Flag Officer Submarines double-hatted as NATO Commander Submarine Force Eastern Atlantic (COMSUBEASTLANT) part of Allied Command Atlantic, moved from HMS Dolphin at Gosport to the Northwood Headquarters.

HMS Conqueror made history in 1982 during the Falklands War when she became the first nuclear-powered submarine to sink a surface ship, the General Belgrano. HMS Splendid and HMS Spartan hunted the Argentine Navy carrier group Task Group 79.1 but did not engage.

At the end of the Cold War in 1989 the Flag Officer Submarines, who was also COMSUBEASTLANT, a rear admiral, commanded a fleet of 30 submarines which were grouped into four squadrons (First, Second, Third, and Tenth (SSBN)) at three bases.

=== Post Cold War ===
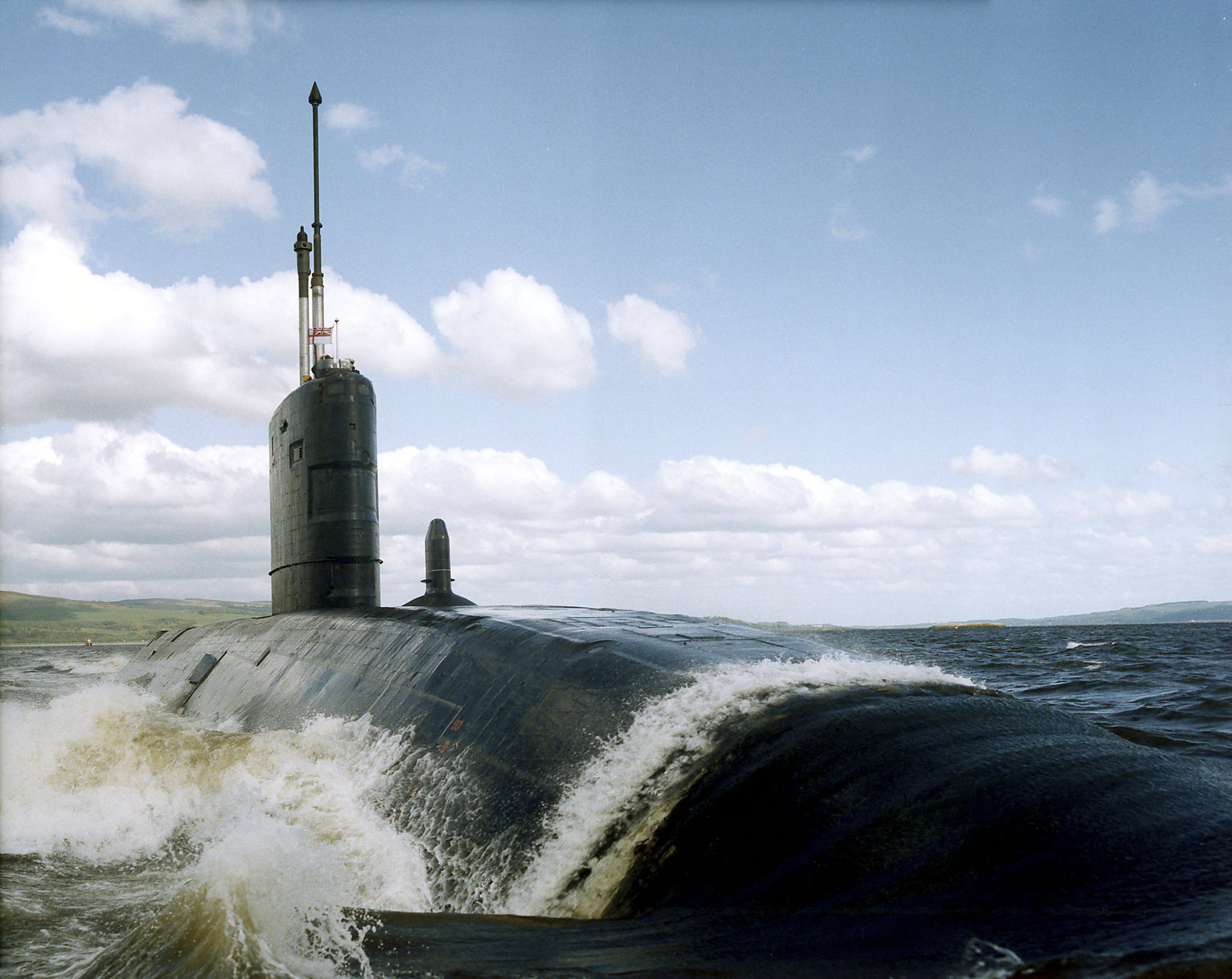
HMS Superb on the Clyde in Scotland in 1993.

In May 1991 Oberon-class submarines Opossum and her sister Otus returned to the submarine base HMS Dolphin in Gosport from patrol in the Persian Gulf flying Jolly Rogers, indicating successful actions.

In 1999 Splendid participated in the Kosovo Conflict and became the first Royal Navy submarine to fire a Tomahawk cruise missile in anger.

During Operation Veritas, the attack on Al-Qaeda and Taliban forces following the September 11 attacks in the United States,Trafalgar was the first Royal Navy submarine to launch Tomahawk cruise missiles against targets in Afghanistan. Triumph was also involved in the initial strikes. Turbulent launched fourteen Tomahawks during the 2003 invasion of Iraq.

In 2011, HMS Triumph and Turbulent participated in Operation Ellamy. They launched Tomahawk cruise missiles at targets in Libya, firing the first shots of the operation.

In April 2016, The Sunday Times reported that Royal Navy submarines were to resume under-ice operations in the Arctic. Such operations have not taken place since 2007 after a fatal explosion on board Tireless. The crews of all seven active Royal Navy attack submarines will receive training on how to navigate below and "punch through" ice floes.

In 2018, there had been three near misses over four years between submerged Royal Navy submarines and civilian vessels due to "an insufficient appreciation of the location of surface ships in the vicinity", according to a Marine Accident Investigation Branch report.

For an extended period of time, the navy has had difficulty in attracting specialist staff into the nuclear submarine force, in part because of the long undersea patrols. In 2008 there were shortfalls of 28% in senior nuclear engineering officers, 23% in sonar and sensor operators, and 20% in nuclear weapons system junior ranks. In 2018, the National Audit Office highlighted the shortage of 337 skilled Royal Navy nuclear staff. In 2023, Chief of the Naval Staff Admiral Sir Ben Key said recruiting for the submarine service was still proving difficult and the service was in a "war for talent".

In October 2024, First Sea Lord Admiral Ben Key issued an apology for misogyny in the Submarine Service, after a series of investigations across the navy exposed sexual harassment, bullying and assault of women sailors. This followed a series of investigations which led to three navy personnel being sacked and a fourth disciplined. In December 2023, the Submarine Service had published their redacted investigation report, which had been instigated following allegations reported by the Daily Mail on 16 October 2022.

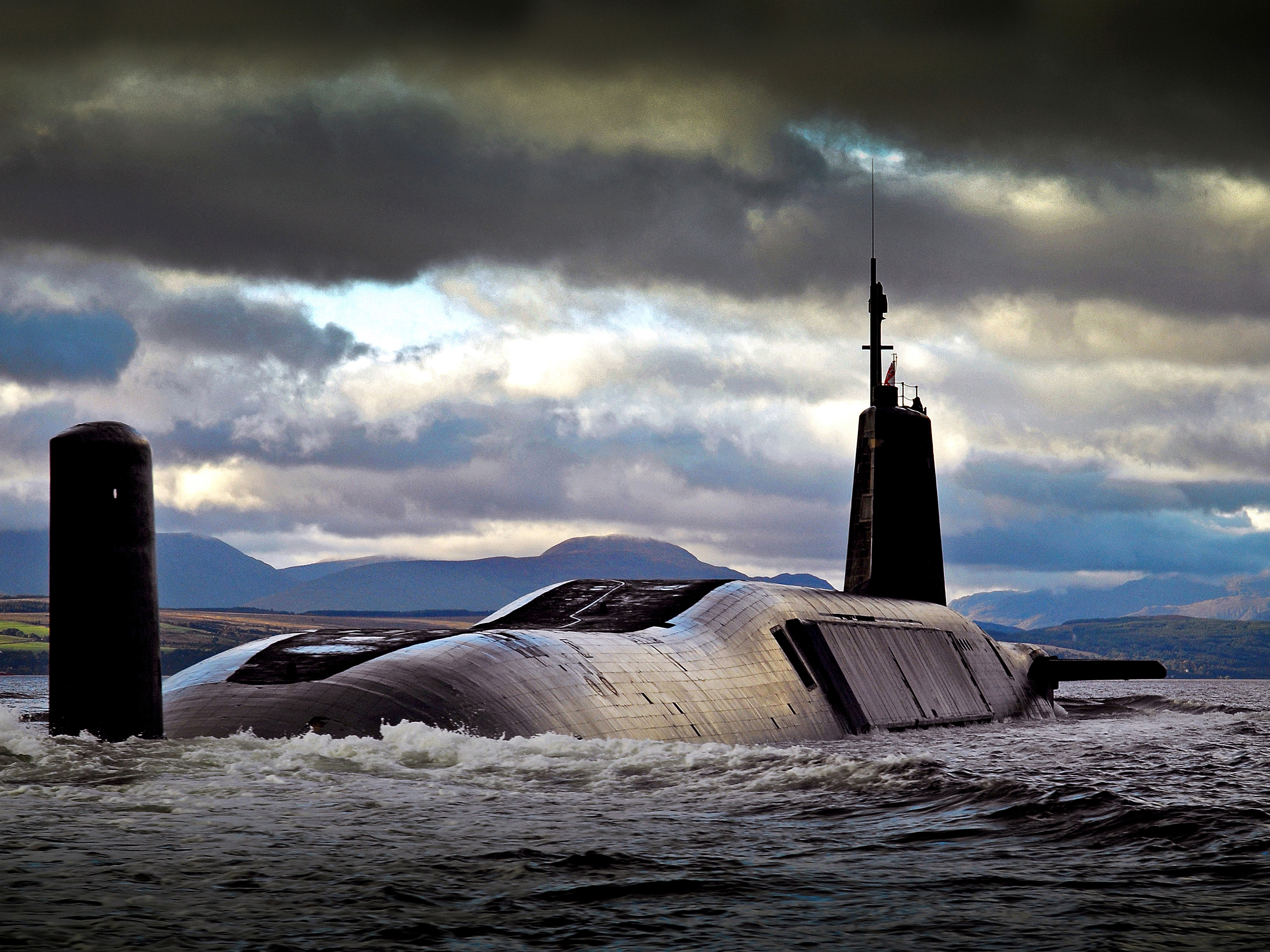
HMS Vengeance which completed the navy's record underwater deployment of 217-day submerged in 2026.

In December 2025, the former director of nuclear policy who led the 2010 Trident value for money review, Rear Admiral Philip Mathias, said the service faced an unprecedented situation, with record delays in building fleet submarines and "shockingly low availability” of submarines which had driven up patrol duration for crews to more than 200 days up from the 70 days during the Cold War. He highlighted that three Astute submarines had spent more than 950 days in maintenance outages and that HMS Agamemnon (S124) had taken over 13 years to build, and called for Britain to pull out of the AUKUS programme to build 12 new nuclear submarines as "The UK is no longer capable of managing a nuclear submarine programme". In June 2026, The Daily Telegraph reported that all British attack submarines were in port awaiting maintenance and repair, other than the recently commissioned Achilles which was not yet ready to deploy.

The refuelling and refit of HMS Vanguard (S28) took from 2015 to 2022. The overrun of the maintenance by about four years had a major impact on Vanguard-class operations, causing other vessels in the class to have to operate extended-length Continuous at Sea Deterrent patrols, of up to 205 days (nearly 7 months) at sea compared to the previously generally planned 99 day patrols, impacting submariner retention and recruitment. In November 2026, HMS Vengeance (S31) completed a 217-day submerged deployment, a new Royal Navy record.

== Perisher ==
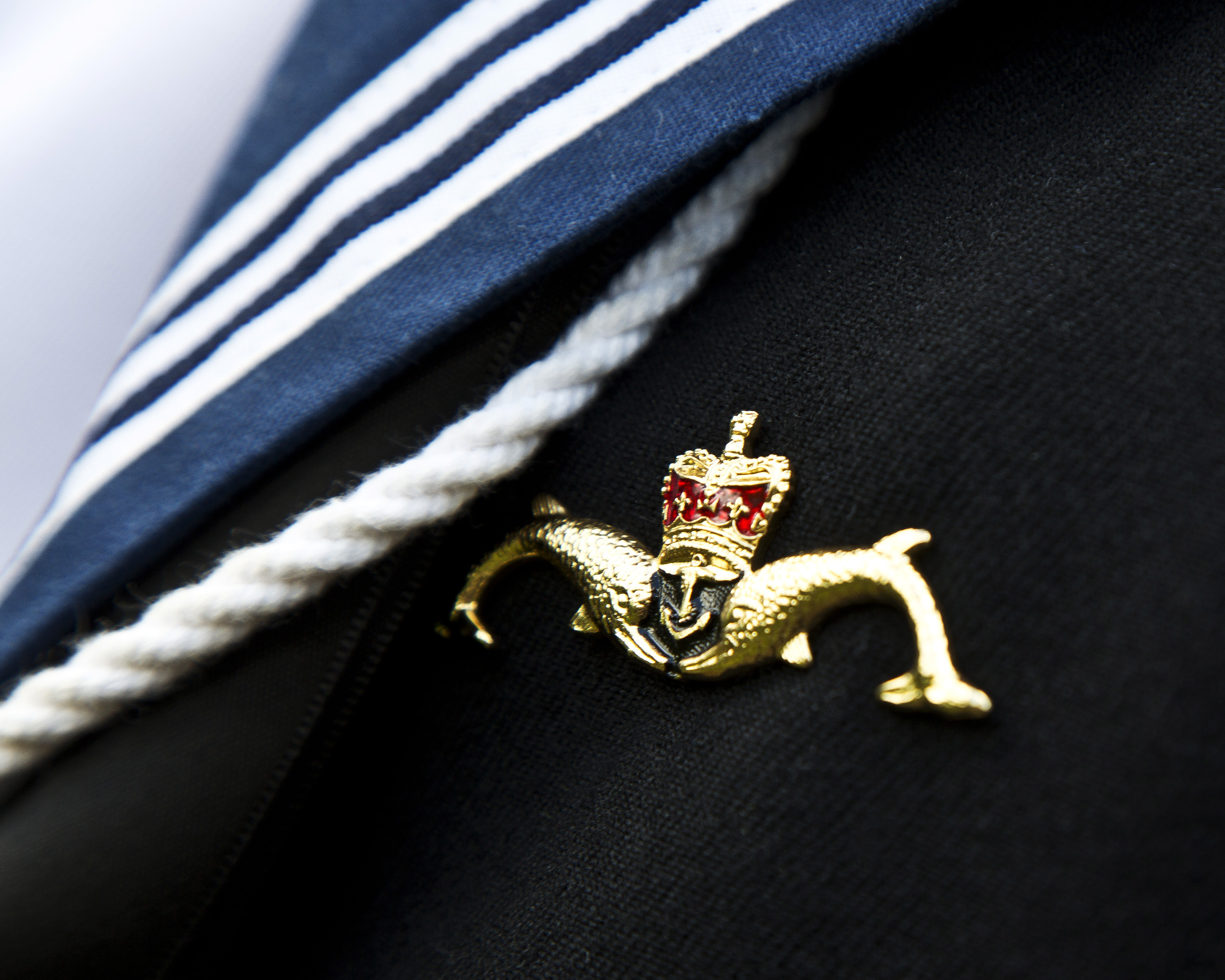
The "Dolphins" badge, issued to all British submariners on completion of training. It is worn on the upper left breast, just above any medal ribbons.

'Perisher' (as the Submarine Command Course is better known) is a 24-week course all officers must take prior to serving as an executive officer on board a Royal Navy submarine. It has been run twice a year since 1917, usually starting on 2 July and 14 November each year. It is widely regarded as one of the toughest command courses in the world, with a historical failure rate of 25%.

If at any point during the training a candidate is withdrawn from training they will be nominated for boat transfer and kept occupied until the transfer. Their bag is packed for them and they are notified of the failure when the boat arrives. On departure they are presented with a bottle of whisky. A failure on Perisher means that the unsuccessful candidate is not permitted to return to sea as a member of the Submarine Service (although they are still allowed to wear the dolphin badge). They are, however, permitted to remain in the Royal Navy, moving into the surface fleet.

In more recent years, the United States Navy has sent some of its own submariner officers to undergo the 'Perisher', in order to foster and maintain closer links with the Royal Navy.

In 1995 the Royal Netherlands Navy took over the Perisher course for diesel-electric submarines, since the Royal Navy no longer operates boats of that type. The course is attended by candidate submarine commanders from navies around the world.

== Traditions ==
The Submarine Service has many traditions that are not found in the surface fleet. These include slang unique to submariners (such as referring to the torpedo storage compartment as the Bomb Shop and the diesel engine room as the Donk Shop), a special communications code known as the Dolphin Code and the entitlement of a sailor to wear Dolphins and black cap covers upon entering the service. These are only awarded after completion of training and qualification in ships' systems during the first submarine posting (Part III training).

=== The Jolly Roger and the Submarine Service ===
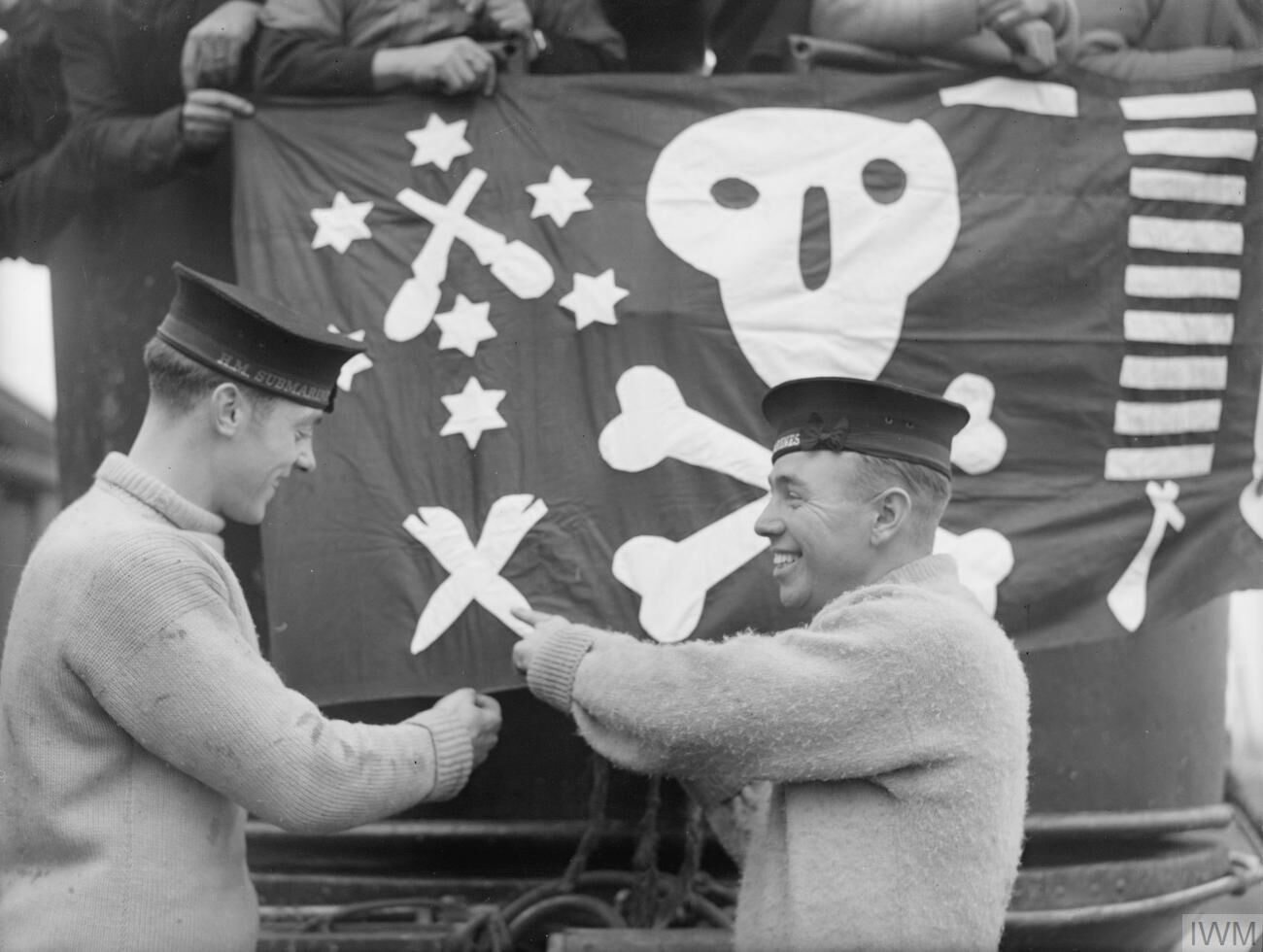
The Jolly Roger flag of HMS Proteus (N29) in 1942; the bars symbolizing ships sunk by torpedo, the stars denote ships sunk by gunfire and the crossed can openers record surviving a ramming.

Rear-Admiral Arthur Wilson VC, the Controller of the Royal Navy, has gone down in history as the officer who claimed in 1901 "[Submarines are] underhand, unfair, and damned un-English. ... treat all submarines as pirates in wartime ... and hang all crews," In fact he had advocated the purchase of submarines the year before, and he was actually expressing a desire to continue the policy of discouraging foreign powers from building submarines while the Royal Navy developed its own in secret. The legend goes that in response to these top secret remarks of Wilson's made 13 years earlier Lieutenant-Commander (later Admiral Sir) Max Horton first flew the Jolly Roger on return to port after sinking the German cruiser Hela and the destroyer S-116 in 1914 while in command of the E-class submarine E9.

In World War II it became common practice for the submarines of the Royal Navy to fly the Jolly Roger on completion of a successful combat mission where some action had taken place, but as an indicator of bravado and stealth rather than of lawlessness. For example, in 1982 returning from the Falklands conflict Conqueror flew the Jolly Roger depicting one dagger for the SBS deployment to South Georgia and one torpedo for her sinking of the Argentinian cruiser General Belgrano. The Jolly Roger is now the emblem of the Royal Navy Submarine Service.

=== Dolphins Badge ===
First officially adopted in the 1950s, qualified submariners are presented the Golden Dolphins badge to wear on their uniform on the left breast above any medals. The current badge, adopted in 1972, depicts two golden dolphins facing an anchor surmounted by St Edwards Crown. In September 2020, it was announced that all trainee submariners would be issued their own dolphins badge; similar to the Golden Dolphins in size and shape, though completely black.

=== Deterrent Patrol Badge ===
Submariners who serve on the Trident 'Deterrent' patrols are eligible for another badge - the 'Deterrent Patrol Badge'. The badge is similar to the American SSBN Deterrent Patrol insignia, though bears the motto 'Always Ready'. It is awarded in three grades based on the amount of patrols completed: Pewter (1), Silver (10), and Gold (20).

== Active submarines ==
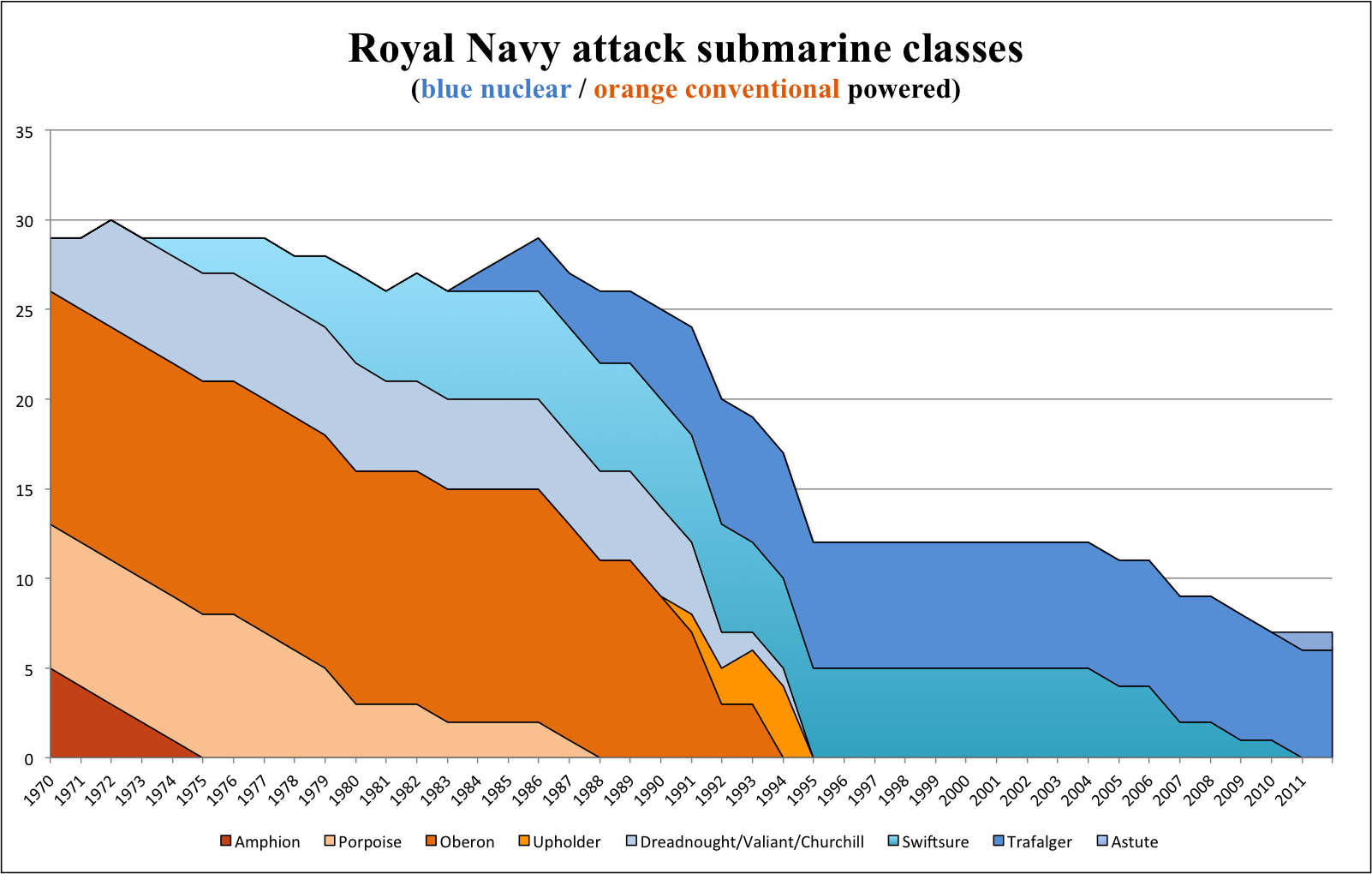
The decline in attack submarine numbers since 1970 and the concentration on nuclear-powered vessels.

The Submarine Service consists of one class of Fleet submarines and one class of Ballistic Missile submarines.

=== Fleet submarines ===
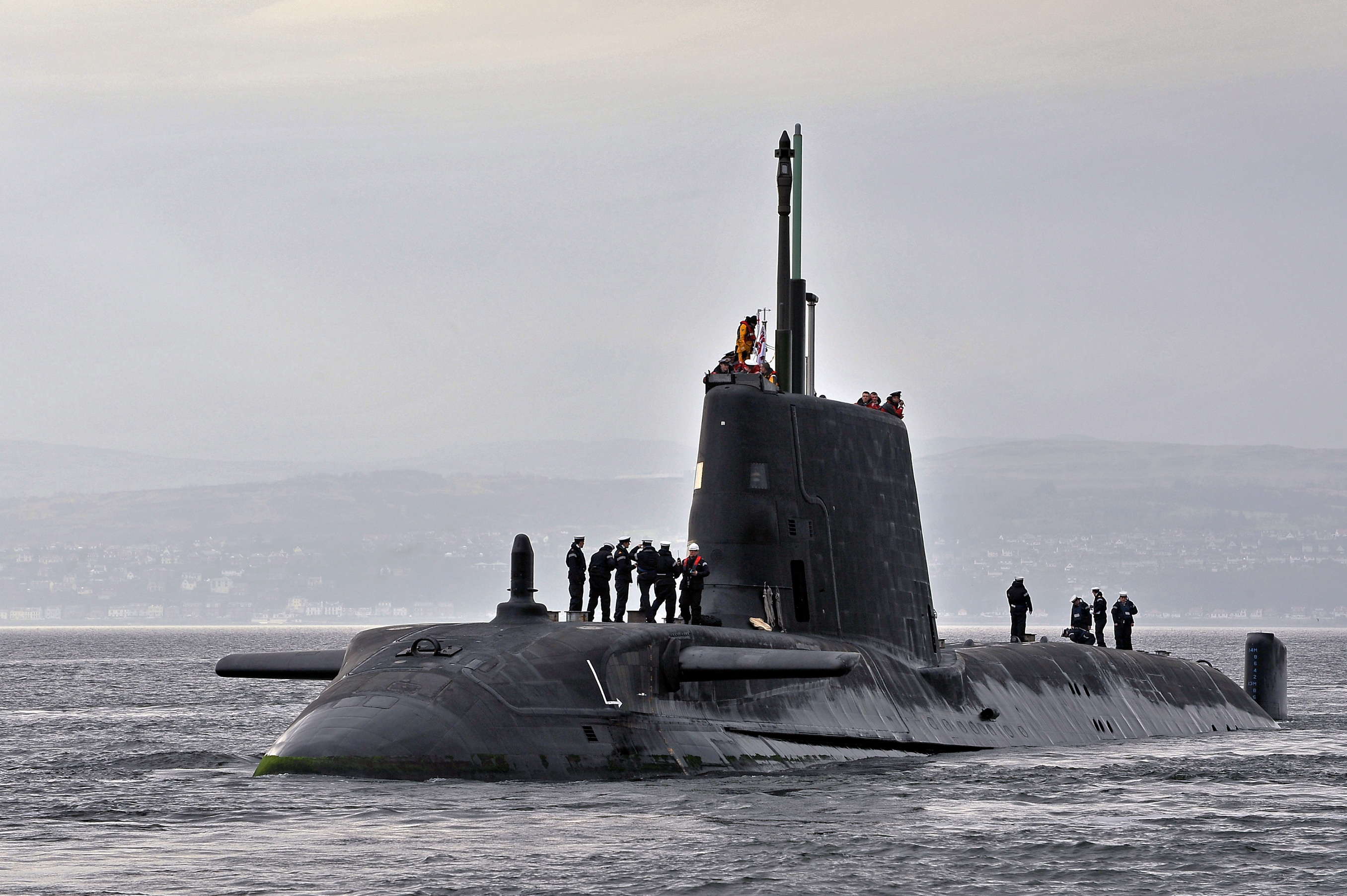
HMS Astute, a nuclear-powered fleet submarine.

There are six Astute-class fleet submarines in commission. They are all nuclear submarines and are classified as SSNs.

These submarines are armed with the Spearfish torpedo for anti-submarine and anti-surface warfare. They have the ability to fire Tomahawk cruise missiles for attacking targets on land. This capability was used by HMS Trafalgar against the Taliban in 2001 during Operation Veritas. The Fleet submarines are also capable of surveillance and reconnaissance missions. Fleet submarines are sometimes referred to as "attack" or "hunter-killer" submarines.

Name	Class	Pennant Number	Commissioned
Astute	Astute	S119	2010
Ambush	Astute	S120	2013
Artful	Astute	S121	2016
Audacious	Astute	S122	2020
Anson	Astute	S123	2022
Agamemnon	Astute	S124	2025

=== Ballistic submarines ===
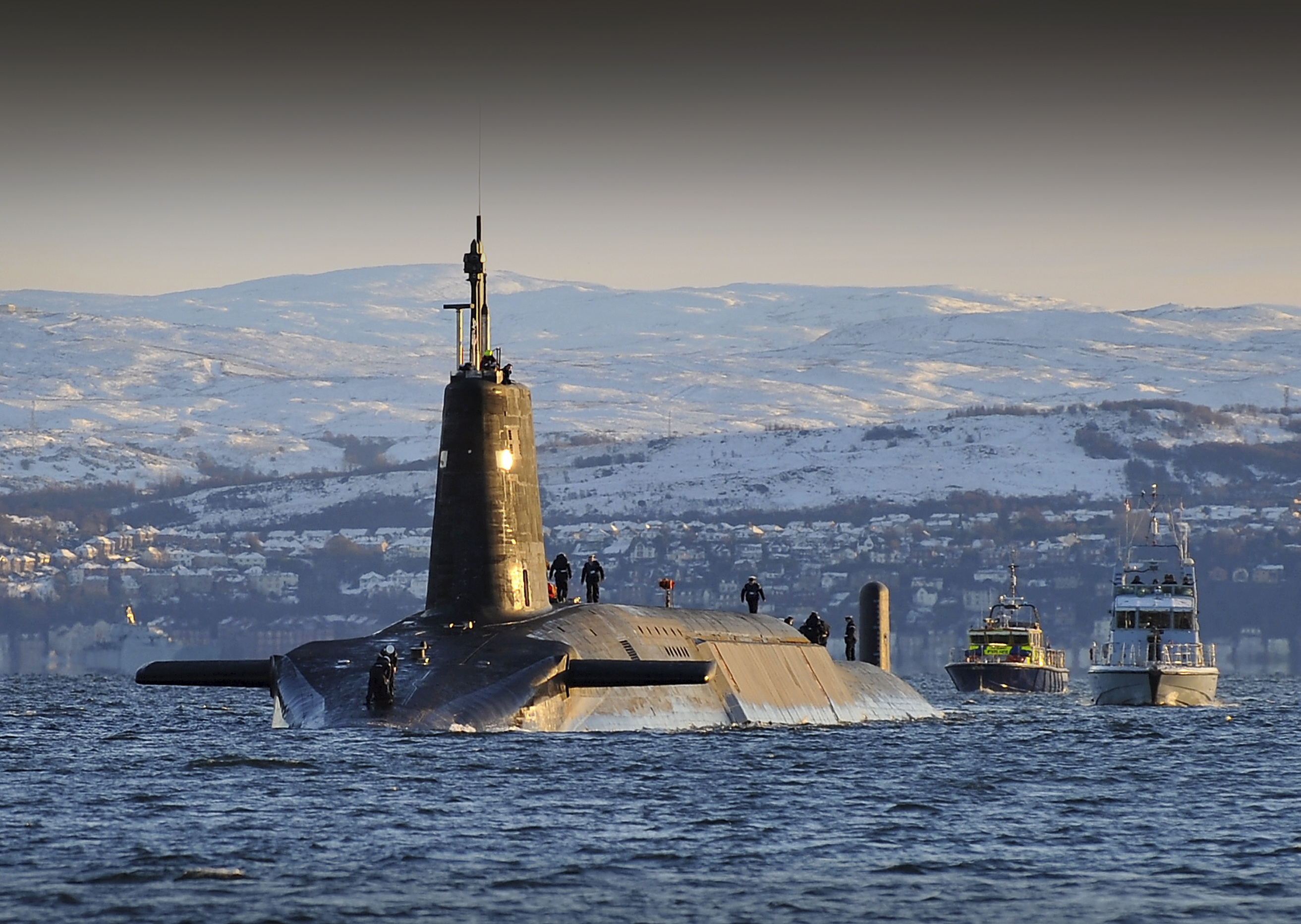
HMS Vanguard, a ballistic missile submarine.

The four ballistic missile submarines (SSBN) of the Royal Navy are all of the Vanguard class. They were all built by Vickers Shipbuilding and Engineering Ltd., now BAE Systems Submarine Solutions. The SSBN flotilla or bomber 'fleet' tends to be almost a separate entity; for example, it rarely uses pennant numbers preferring to use hull numbers, thus Vanguard 05, Victorious 06, Vigilant 07 and Vengeance 08.

The four Vanguard class boats are responsible for the United Kingdom's nuclear deterrent, and use the Trident missile system. Each boat can carry up to 16 Trident II D5 Missiles, each of which may carry up to 12 nuclear warheads. As of 2022 it is UK Government policy to refrain from declaring current stockpiles, deployed warheads and deployed missile numbers. There has been at least one SSBN on patrol at all times since April 1969.

Name	Class	Pennant Number	Commissioned
Vanguard	Vanguard	S28	1993
Victorious	Vanguard	S29	1995
Vigilant	Vanguard	S30	1996
Vengeance	Vanguard	S31	1999

=== Rescue systems ===
The Royal Navy operated the LR5 Submarine Rescue System, designed for retrieving sailors from stranded submarines. Capable of rescuing up to 16 sailors at a time, the system was deployed to the wreck site of the sunken Kursk. The system was replaced in 2004 with the NATO Submarine Rescue System which remains based in the UK.

The Royal Navy, along with France and Norway, is part of the NATO Submarine Rescue System.

== Decommissioning nuclear submarines ==
Twenty-three decommissioned nuclear submarines have been laid-up at Rosyth and Devonport. In 2014 the MOD announced a plan to decommission 7 of the submarines awaiting disposal, in a project expected to take 12 years. A site for the intermediate-level nuclear waste produced was expected to be identified by 2016. A trial dismantling of a nuclear submarine was planned to start in January 2016 at Rosyth.

In 2018, the UK Parliament's Public Accounts Committee criticised the slow rate of decommissioning of these submarines, with the Ministry of Defence admitting that it had put off decommissioning due to the cost. The National Audit Office in 2019 stated that the accumulative costs of laid up storage had reached £500 million, and they represent a liability of £7.5 billion.

In 2019 it was acknowledged that the UK had more decommissioned nuclear-powered submarines than they had submarines in service, a problem that has been ignored for over 50 years as the UK did not have a clear funding plan for defuelling and dismantling of these submarines. The US have been decommissioning nuclear submarines for many years in a programme that is self funding by recycling many of the components. It's possible that their expertise in decommissioning could be leverage in securing submarine building contracts from the UK.

As of 2025, Babcock International was in the process of dismantling the former submarine HMS Swiftsure, which in 2026 will be the first ex-Royal Navy SSN to have been fully dismantled.

== Future submarines ==
A total force of seven Astute fleet submarines is planned. As of September 2025, the first six boats have been completed and are in commission. Boat six has commissioned and started sea trials, but as of 2026 is not yet fully operational, and boat seven is at an advanced stage of construction. Boat number seven was confirmed in the October 2010 Strategic Defence and Security Review and long-lead items have been ordered. The Astute-class submarine is the largest nuclear fleet submarine ever to serve with the Royal Navy, being nearly 30% larger than its predecessors. Its powerplant is the Rolls-Royce PWR2 reactor, developed for the Vanguard-class SSBN. The submarine's armament consists of up to 38 Spearfish torpedoes and Tomahawk Block IV land-attack cruise missiles.

The replacement class for the Vanguard SSBNs was ordered in 2016 and is named the Dreadnought after its lead boat. The programme will seek to replace one-for-one the current four ballistic missile submarines starting sometime during the early 2030s.

There is also a program for a Maritime Underwater Future Capability (MUFC), that is, a successor to the Astute-class SSN. MUFC was initially known as the 'Astute Replacement Nuclear Submarine (SSN (R))'. However, in 2023 the program expanded to include the joint acquisition, with American support, of nuclear-powered submarines by the United Kingdom and Australia. The successor submarine was then renamed SSN-AUKUS. In 2025, the British Government indicated that it would endeavour to build up to 12 SSNs of this type with initial service entry for the first boat envisaged in the latter 2030s.

The Fleet Experimentation Squadron, within the Disruptive Capabilities and Technologies Office, operates a number of vessels and systems to trial high technology military capabilities. These include vessels such as XV Excalibur, an Extra Large Uncrewed Submarine (XLUUV) christened in 2025. Uncrewed submarines are seen as potential component of Project CABOT which is considering the possible employment of autonomous vessels for anti-submarine operations in the North Atlantic. The 2026 Defence Investment Plan envisages the acquisition of a new class of uncrewed submarines identified as the Type 93 ‘Chariot’. These are to complement other surface platforms in constructing an anti-submarine barrier in the North Atlantic. Prototype XLUUVs were expected to be in service by 2030 with payloads developed through AUKUS

== See also ==
- List of submarine classes of the Royal Navy
- List of submarines of the Royal Navy
- Royal Navy Submarine Museum

== Bibliography ==
- Chalmers, William (1954). Max Horton and the Western Approaches: A biography of Admiral Sir Max Kennedy Horton. London: Hodder & Stoughton.
- Conley, Dan (2014). Cold War Command: The Dramatic Story of a Nuclear Submariner. South Yorkshire, England: Seaforth Publishing. ISBN 978-1-84832-769-6.
- Holland, James (2003). Fortress Malta: An Island Under Siege, 1940–1943. London: Miramax Books. ISBN 1-4013-5186-7.
- Lambert, Nicholas A. (2001). The Submarine Service, 1900–1918. Ashgate. ISBN 9780754602941.
- Ring, Jim (2001). We Come Unseen: The Untold Story of Britain's Cold War Submariners. London: John Murray. ISBN 9780719556906.
- Spooner, Tony (1996). Supreme Gallantry: Malta's Role in the Allied Victory, 1939–1945. London: J. Murray. ISBN 978-0-71955-706-4.
