= HMS Sovereign (S108) =

Swiftsure-class nuclear-powered fleet submarine of the Royal Navy

History

United Kingdom
- Name: Sovereign
- Ordered: 16 March 1969
- Builder: Vickers
- Laid down: 18 September 1970
- Launched: 17 February 1973
- Commissioned: 11 July 1974
- Decommissioned: 12 September 2006
- Identification: Pennant number: S108
- Fate: Paid off
- Badge

General characteristics
- Class & type: Swiftsure-class submarine
- Displacement: 4,900 tonnes (dived)
- Length: 82.9 m (272 ft 0 in)
- Beam: 9.8 m (32 ft 2 in)
- Draught: 8.5 m (27 ft 11 in)
- Speed: Over 20 knots (37 km/h; 23 mph), dived
- Complement: 116
- Armament: 5 × 21 in (533 mm) torpedo tubes; Spearfish torpedoes; RN Sub Harpoon missiles; Tomahawk cruise missiles

HMS Sovereign was a Swiftsure-class nuclear-powered fleet submarine of the Royal Navy.

== Construction ==
Construction of the boat began on 18 September 1970. She was launched on 17 February 1973 and commissioned on 11 July 1974.

== Operational history ==
In 1976, Sovereign played a role in Operation Brisk; the submarine surfaced at the geographical North Pole on 20 October 1976 as part of the exercise, testing navigational systems and equipment performance in low temperatures.

HMS Sovereign actually surfaced on 21 October 1976 about halfway between the Geographic North Pole and the northern tip of Ellesmere Island. Brisk was a coordinated operation between the Royal Navy and the Canadian Forces Maritime Proving & Evaluation Unit (MP&EU) from CFB Summerside, Prince Edward Island. MP&EU was in a six-year project of evaluating airborne remote sensing devices including a SLAR, ILRS and a Laser Profilometer which were all used to do imaging during Sovereign's through-ice surfacing.

In September 1978, Sovereign engaged in Operation Agile Eagle, with the mission of locating and tracking a Soviet Delta-class submarine believed to be operating in the Eastern Atlantic Ocean. Sovereign acquired the Delta-class submarine on 6 October 1978 and remained in contact undetected for 49 days.

Sovereign underwent an extensive refit in the mid-1990s and was rededicated in January 1997. Cracks were discovered in the tailshaft during post-refit sea trials and she was sent to Rosyth for 14 weeks of emergency repairs in June 1998 before returning to Faslane.

Sovereign was used for the "Perisher" Submarine Command Course in June 1999 as well as other training cruises. She was part of the NATO exercise Linked Seas in May 2000, operating in the Bay of Biscay.

In the early 2000s, Sovereign was out of service for some time due to reactor problems, a fault she shared with other submarines of her class. Although she was back in full service by July 2005, the submarine was decommissioned as of September 2006.
