= S121 =

S121 may refer to:

- HMS Artful (S121), a 2010 proposed Astute-class nuclear Fleet submarine of the Royal Navy
- S Pipinos (S 121), a Type 214 submarine
