= S105 =

S105 may refer to:

- HMS Spartan (S105), a 1978 nuclear-powered fleet submarine of the Royal Navy Swiftsure class
- a Saviem bus model
