= S109 =

S109 may refer to:

- County Route S109, a county route in Bergen County, New Jersey
- HMS Superb (S109), a 1974 British nuclear-powered fleet submarine of the Swiftsure class
