= HMS Agamemnon (S124) =

Astute-class nuclear-powered attack submarine

History

United Kingdom
- Name: Agamemnon
- Namesake: Agamemnon
- Ordered: March 2010
- Builder: BAE Systems Submarines
- Cost: £1.5 billion (budget)
- Laid down: 18 July 2013
- Launched: 3 October 2024
- Christened: 22 April 2024
- Commissioned: 22 September 2025
- Identification: Pennant number: S124
- Motto: "Up The Spear" (Unofficial)
- Status: Sea trials
- Badge

General characteristics
- Class & type: Astute-class fleet submarine
- Displacement: Surfaced: 7,000 to 7,400 t (6,900 to 7,300 long tons); Submerged: 7,400 to 7,800 t (7,700 long tons)
- Length: 97 m (318 ft 3 in)
- Beam: 11.3 m (37 ft 1 in)
- Draught: 10 m (32 ft 10 in)
- Propulsion: Rolls-Royce PWR 2 reactor, MTU 600 kW (800 hp) diesel generators
- Speed: 30 knots (56 km/h; 35 mph), submerged
- Range: Unlimited
- Endurance: 90 days
- Test depth: Over 300 m (980 ft)
- Complement: 98 (capacity for 109)
- Sensors & processing systems: Thales Sonar 2076; Atlas DESO 25 echosounder; 2 × Thales CM010 optronic masts; Raytheon Successor IFF
- Armament: 6 × 21 in (533 mm) torpedo tubes with stowage for up to 38 weapons: Tomahawk Block IV cruise missiles; Spearfish heavyweight torpedoes

HMS Agamemnon is the sixth Astute-class nuclear-powered fleet submarine of the Royal Navy. She is the sixth vessel of the Royal Navy to bear the name, after the legendary Greek king Agamemnon.

== Construction ==
On 25 March 2010, BAE Systems Submarines were contracted by the government to begin construction on boats 5 and 6 (Anson and Agamemnon), being given a £300 million contract for the initial build of boat 5 and long lead procurement activities for boat 6. Initial construction work was begun on boat 6 late in 2010.

On 15 September 2011, its name was announced as Agamemnon. The keel was laid on 18 July 2013 by the Minister for Defence Equipment, Support and Technology, Philip Dunne. On 17 April 2017, a £1.5 billion contract for the submarine's completion was signed.

Agamemnon's electric switchboards were powered up for the first time on 1 October 2020. The vessel was christened on 23 April 2024, with a bottle of beer from the local Ulverston Brewing Company. On 2 October 2024, Agamemnon was rolled out of the build hall and was launched the next day.

Agamemnon's commissioning took place on 22 September 2025, with the commissioning warrant read by King Charles III. The event was also attended by Secretary of State for Defence, John Healey, First Sea Lord, General Sir Gwyn Jenkins and Charles Woodburn, CEO of BAE Systems. In October 2025, the boat completed a 3-day "trim dive" at the shipyard, designed to confirm the integrity of the submarine's pressure hull.

It had been expected to take approximately 18 months from commissioning to being fully operational. A year after her commissioning the boat had not yet been to sea, even on trials. On 24 September 2026, Agamemnon left the shipyard at Barrow to begin her initial trials.

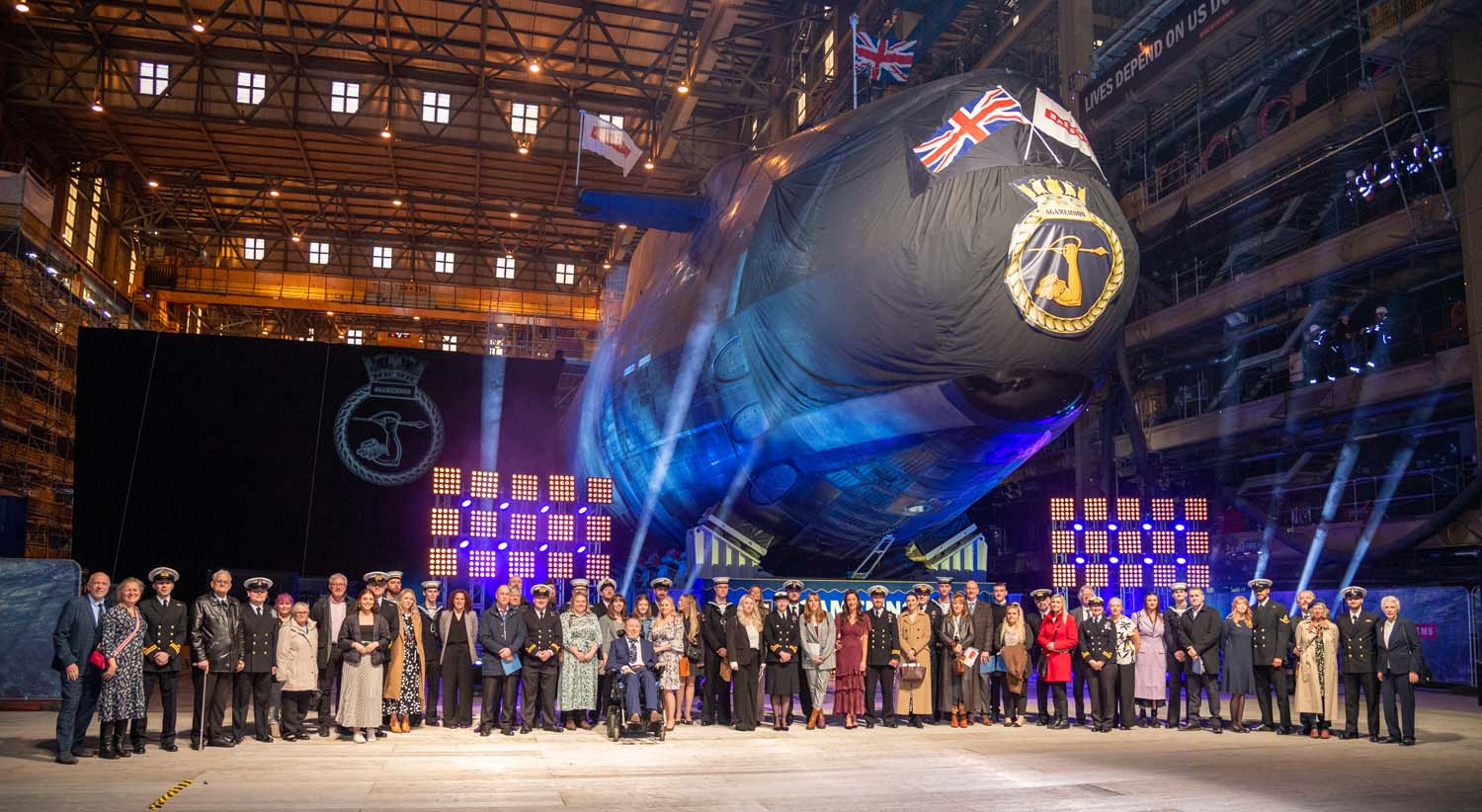
Official naming ceremony of HMS Agamemnon

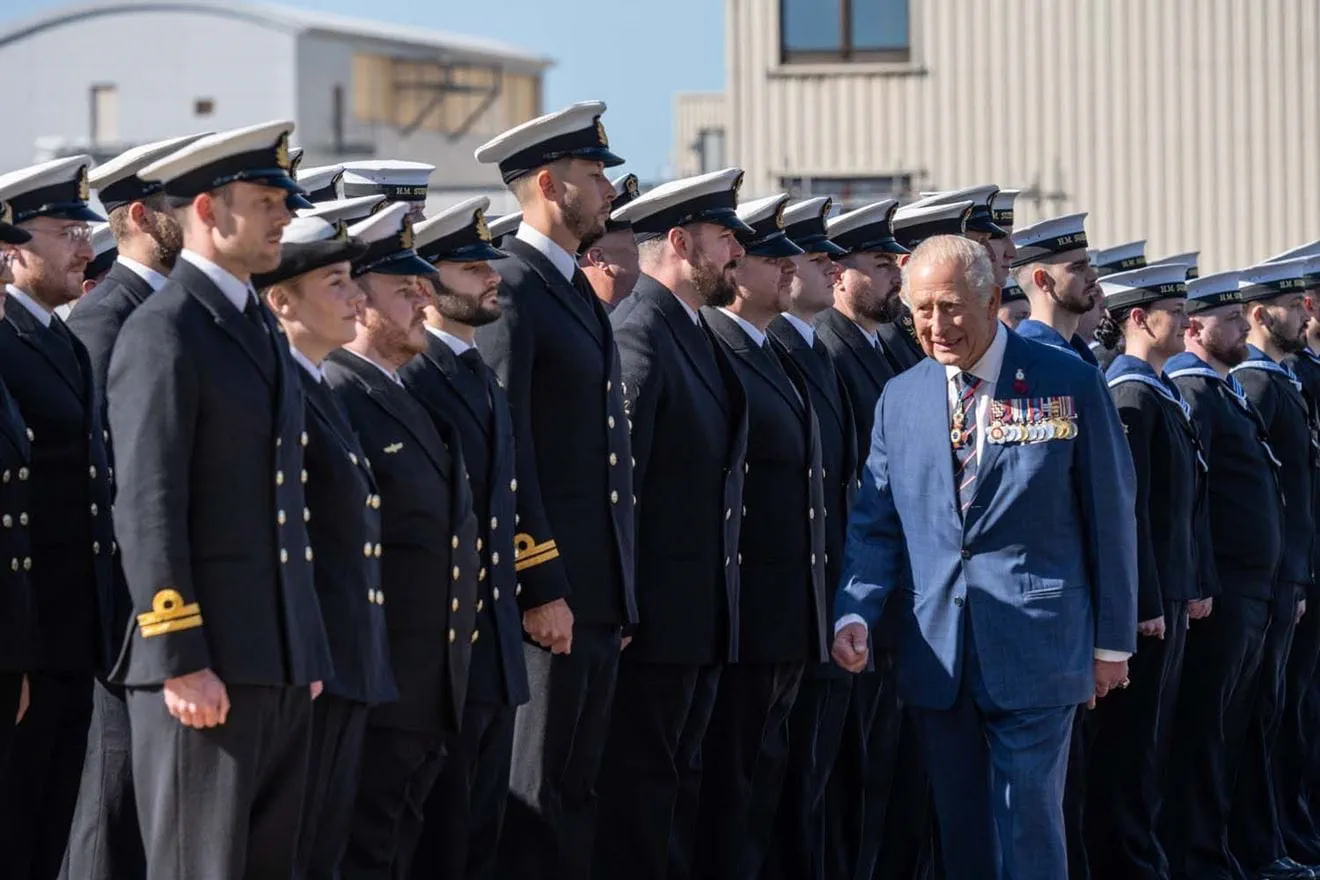
Charles III at commissioning ceremony, 22 September 2025

== Design ==
=== Propulsion ===
Agamemnon's nuclear reactor will not need to be refuelled during the boat's 25-year service. Since the submarine can purify water and air, she will be able to circumnavigate the planet without resurfacing. The submarine's only principal limitation is the vessel's ability to carry provisions for 98 officers and ratings for about three months.

=== Weapons ===
Agamemnon will have provision for up-to 38 weapons in six 21-inch (533 mm) torpedo tubes. The submarine will be capable of using Tomahawk Block IV land-attack missiles with a range of 1,000 miles (1,600 kilometres) and Spearfish heavyweight torpedoes.
