= Roger Lane-Nott =

Royal Navy Rear Admiral (born 1945)

Rear Admiral Roger Lane-Nott CB
- Born: 3 June 1945 (age 81)
- Military career
- Allegiance: United Kingdom
- Branch: Royal Navy
- Service years: 1963–1996
- Rank: Rear Admiral
- Commands: Commander Operations; 1st Frigate Squadron; HMS Coventry; 3rd Submarine Squadron; HMS Splendid; HMS Swiftsure; HMS Walrus
- Conflicts: Falklands War; Gulf War
- Awards: Companion of the Order of the Bath

Rear Admiral Roger Charles Lane-Nott, CB (born 3 June 1945) is a former Royal Navy officer, who served as Commander Operations and Flag Officer of Submarines.

== Early life ==
Lane-Nott received his early formal education at Pangbourne College and the Britannia Royal Naval College.

== Military career ==
He joined the Royal Navy in 1963. He was appointed Commanding Officer the submarine HMS Walrus in 1974, of the submarine HMS Swiftsure in 1976, and of the submarine HMS Splendid in 1979. As Commander of HMS Splendid he saw action during the Falklands War. He went on to be Commander of the 3rd Submarine Squadron in 1983. After promotion to captain on 30 June 1985. he was appointed Assistant Director of Defence Concepts at the Ministry of Defence in 1986, then Commanding Officer of the frigate HMS Coventry as well as Captain of the 1st Frigate Squadron in 1990.

Lane-Nott was Senior Naval Officer Middle East during the latter stages of the Gulf War. After that he became Chief of Staff, Submarines in 1992 and Commander Operations and Flag Officer Submarines in 1993 before retiring from the Royal Navy after 33 years' service in 1996.

== Post-military life ==
In retirement he became the Formula One Race Director & Safety Delegate in 1996 but left after just one season. He went on to be Chief-Executive of the Centre for Marine and Petroleum Technology, before becoming Secretary of the British Racing Drivers' Club. He left in 2006 to become the Chief Executive of the Agricultural Engineers Association, Milking Equipment Association. He retired in December 2014. He is the Chairman of the Governors at Pangbourne College.

== Politics ==
Lane-Nott is a member of 'Veterans for Britain', a primarily ex-H.M. Armed Forces personnel staffed political pressure group, that was established in March 2016 to seek the United Kingdom's withdrawal from the European Union in the 2016 Referendum upon grounds of national military and security sovereignty.

In April 2019 Lane-Nott announced his intention to stand as a candidate for the Brexit Party in the South West of England constituency in the oncoming 2019 European Parliamentary election.

Military offices
New title	Commander Operations; 1993–1996	Succeeded by James Perowne
