= HMS Astute (S119) =

Lead boat of her class nuclear-powered attack submarine of the Royal Navy

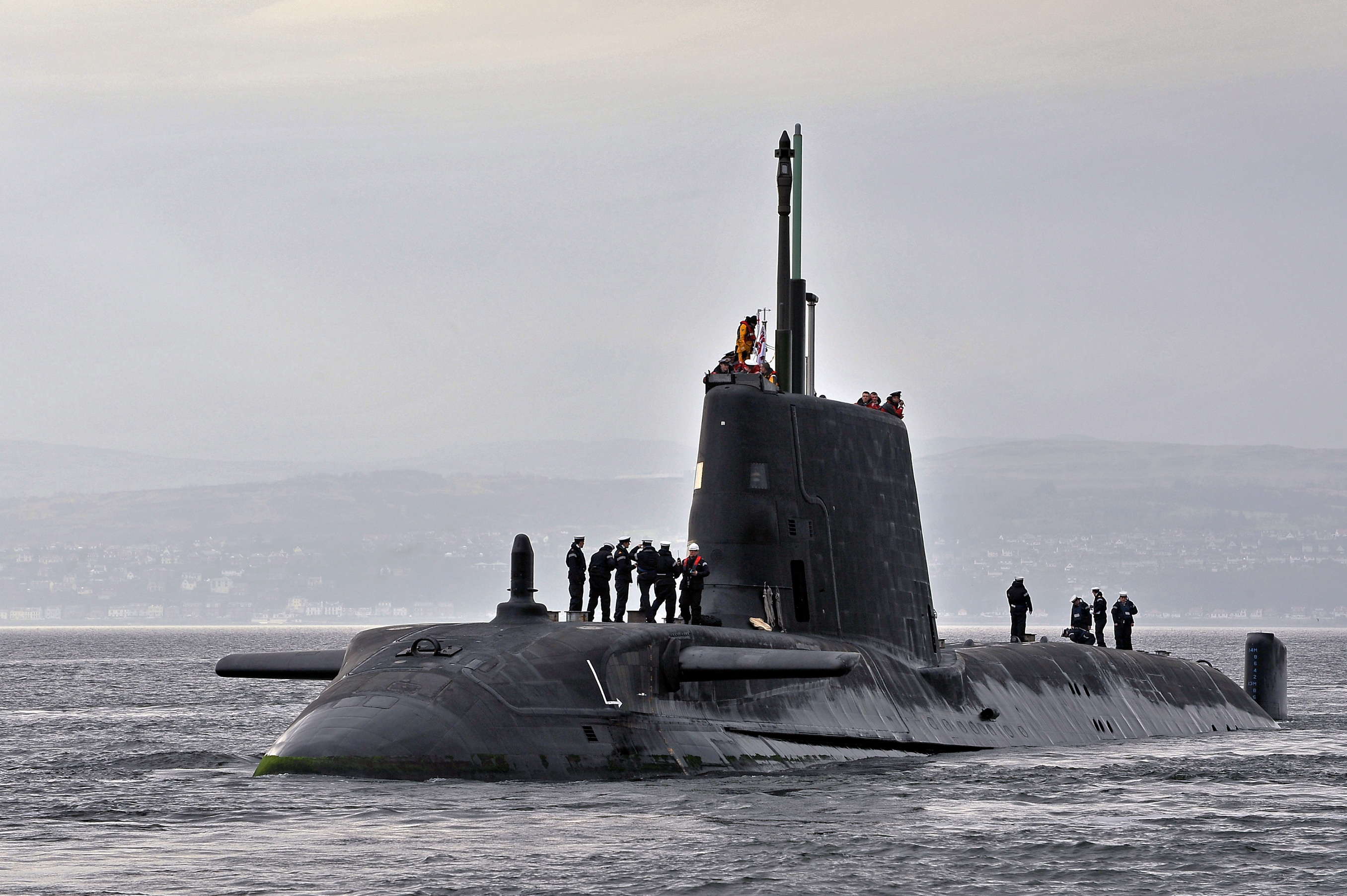
- HMS Astute returning to HMNB Clyde, 2012

History

United Kingdom
- Name: Astute
- Ordered: March 1997
- Builder: BAE Systems Submarine Solutions, Barrow-in-Furness
- Laid down: 31 January 2001
- Launched: 8 June 2007
- Sponsored by: The Queen
- Commissioned: 27 August 2010
- In service: May 2014
- Home port: HM Naval Base Clyde
- Identification: Pennant number: S119
- Status: Operational
- Badge

General characteristics
- Class & type: Astute-class fleet submarine
- Displacement: Surfaced: 7,000 to 7,400 t (7,300 long tons; 8,200 short tons); Submerged: 7,400 to 7,800 t (7,700 long tons; 8,600 short tons)
- Length: 97 m (318 ft 3 in)
- Beam: 11.3 m (37 ft 1 in)
- Draught: 10 m (32 ft 10 in)
- Propulsion: 1 × Rolls-Royce PWR 2 nuclear reactor, HEU 93.5%; MTU 600 kilowatt diesel generators
- Speed: 30 kn (56 km/h; 35 mph), submerged
- Range: Unlimited
- Endurance: 90 days
- Test depth: Over 300 m (984 ft 3 in)
- Complement: 98 (capacity for 109)
- Sensors & processing systems: Thales Sonar 2076; Atlas DESO 25 echosounder; 2 × Thales CM010 optronic masts; Raytheon Successor IFF
- Armament: 6 × 21 in (533 mm) torpedo tubes with stowage for up to 38 weapons: Tomahawk Block IV cruise missiles; Spearfish heavyweight torpedoes

HMS Astute is an operational nuclear-powered attack submarine in the Royal Navy, the lead boat of her class.

Astute is the second submarine of the Royal Navy to be named after the characteristic of shrewdness and discernment—the first was the World War II-era Amphion-class Astute. She was the largest attack submarine in Royal Navy history when commissioned in 2010.

== Design ==
Built as a successor to the Trafalgar class, Astute is 50% larger than the T-boats but has a smaller crew. The 7,400-tonne Astute's nuclear reactor will not need to be refuelled during the vessel's 25-year service. Since the submarine can purify water and air, she is able to circumnavigate the planet without resurfacing. The main limit is that the submarine can only carry three months' supply of food for 98 crew.

Astute has stowage for 38 weapons and was expected to typically carry both Spearfish heavy torpedoes and Tomahawk Block IV cruise missiles, the latter costing £870,000 each.

== Construction and launch ==
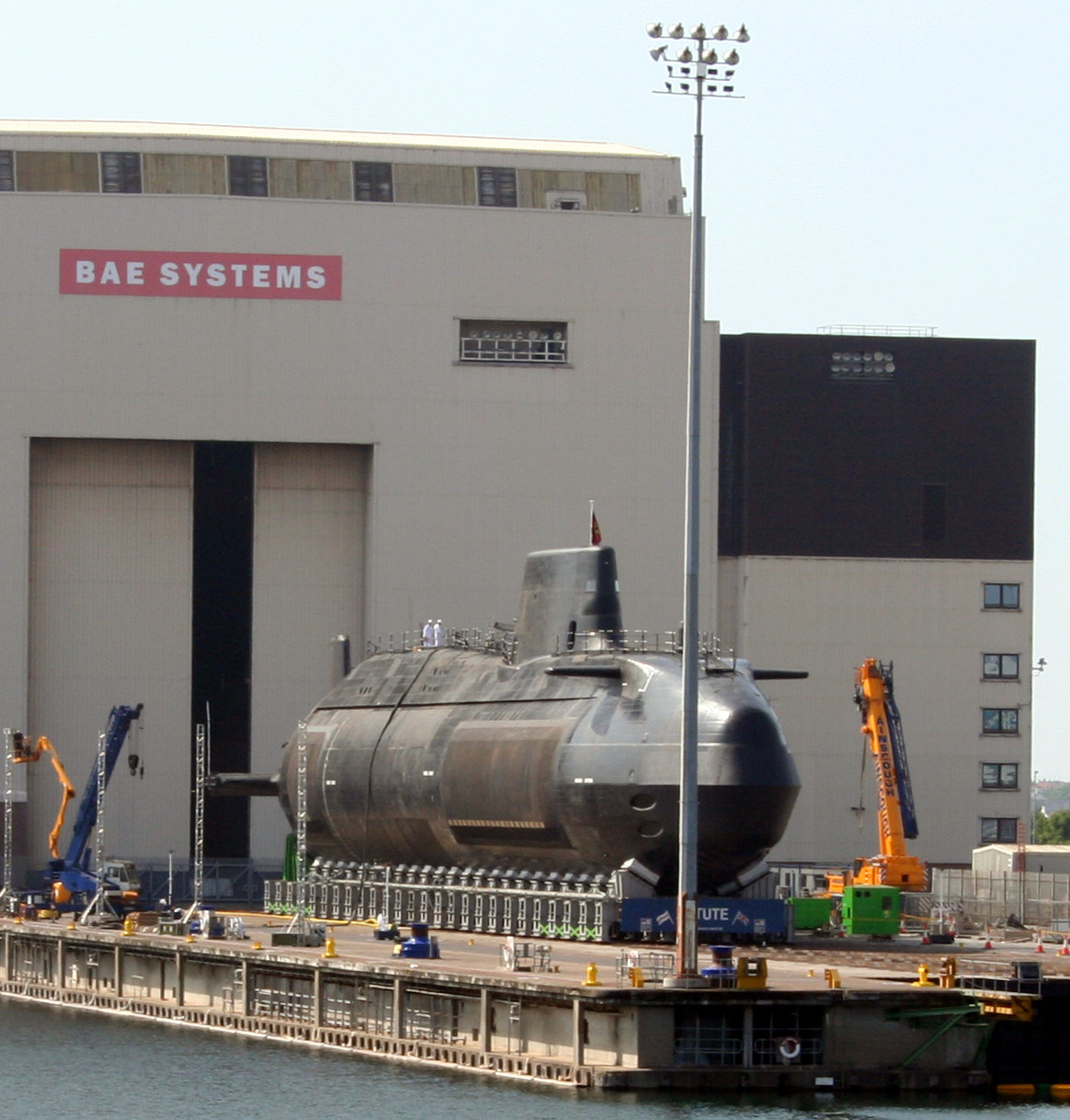
Astute on the shiplift outside Devonshire Dock Hall after launch

Astute was ordered from GEC's Marconi Marine (now BAE Systems Submarines) on 17 March 1997. She was laid down at BAE's submarine facility in Barrow-in-Furness on 31 January 2001, 100 years to the day after the keel was laid down for the Royal Navy's first submarine Holland 1. She was the first submarine built in the UK since HMS Vengeance (launched in 1998).

Astute was launched on 8 June 2007 by the then Duchess of Cornwall, 43 months behind schedule. The launch attracted more than 10,000 spectators. Her builders BAE Systems described her as "the largest and most able attack submarine that the Royal Navy has operated, with a performance to rival any in the world".

Astute left Barrow on 15 November 2009 and on 20 November 2009, arrived at her home port of HMNB Clyde at Faslane.

== Sea trials and commission ==
On 16 February 2010 Astute left Faslane for sea trials and dived for the first time on 18 February 2010. HMS Astute was commissioned on 27 August 2010, when she was given her HMS prefix, in a ceremony watched over by her patron the Duchess of Cornwall. She was delivered to the Royal Navy on 18 July 2013 and at that time was reported to be, "nearing the end of her sea trials." In reality, the Royal Navy declared Astute to be fully operational in May 2014, some 13 years after being laid down.

== Operational history ==
=== Aground on Skye ===
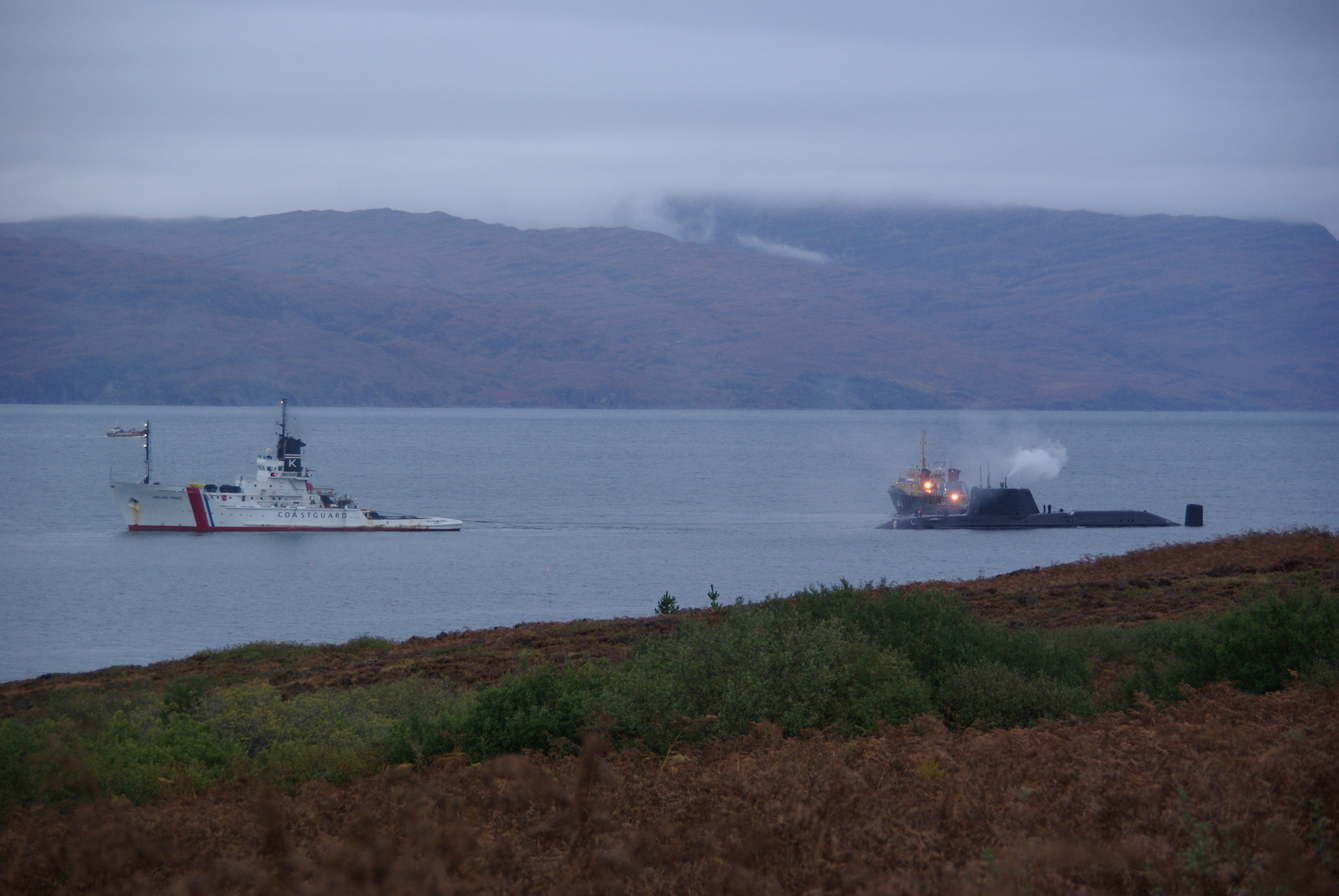
Astute aground with the emergency tow vessel Anglian Prince

On 22 October 2010, the Ministry of Defence confirmed that Astute had "run into difficulties" off the Isle of Skye while on trials, after eyewitnesses reported that she had run aground a few miles from the Skye Bridge. There were no reports of injuries. The captain of the vessel elected to wait for tugboat assistance rather than using the submarine's own power to clear the stern from the obstruction, to minimise damage to the hull's anechoic tiles. A Royal Navy spokesman said that the vessel had been grounded on silt and was re-floated at high tide. The Maritime and Coastguard Agency-chartered emergency tow vessel Anglian Prince was dispatched to the scene from Stornoway.

The submarine returned under her own power to Faslane, where the damage was described as minor. A service inquiry concluded that the main cause of the grounding was not following navigation procedures combined with the watch officer not appreciating the proximity of danger. On 27 October 2010, the Royal Navy announced that Commander Andy Coles had been relieved of his command of Astute. Commander Iain Breckenridge previously commanded the submarine HMS Tireless, and the Navy announced in December 2010 that he would take command. Astute had to return to port for repairs on 11 December 2010, on her first day back at sea after the grounding incident, due to a problem with her steam plant.

=== 2011 fatal shooting ===
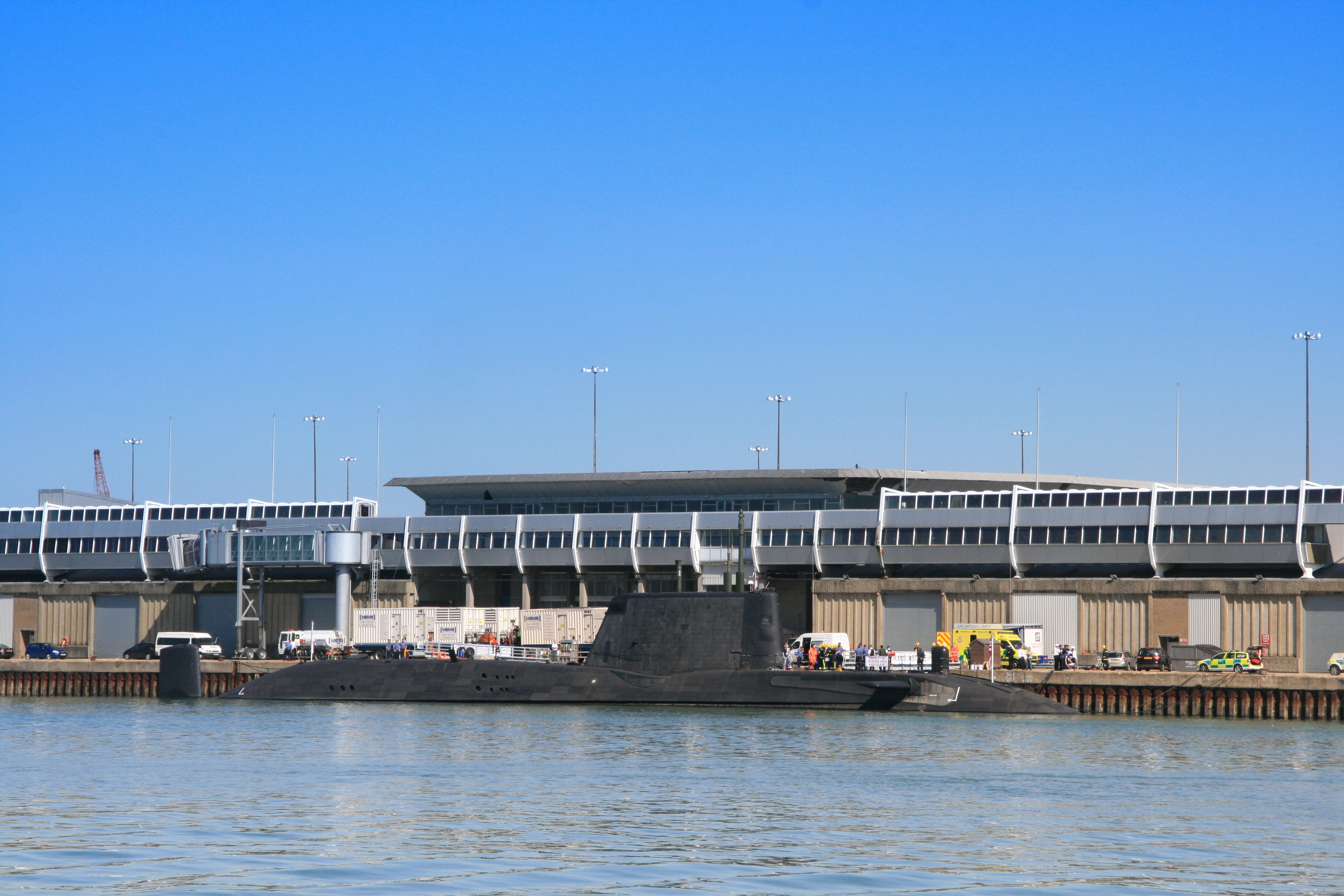
Astute at 38 berth in Southampton Docks on 8 April 2011, the day of the shooting.

On 8 April 2011, one naval officer was killed and another injured in a shooting on board Astute while berthed at Southampton Docks. Southampton City Council's leader, chief executive, and mayor were on board at the time. During a changeover of armed guards, 22-year old Able Seaman Ryan Donovan opened fire with an SA80 assault rifle in the submarine's control room, hitting two officers before being overpowered by Southampton Council's leader Royston Smith (a former RAF flight engineer), and chief executive Alistair Neill.

In the 48 hours before going on guard duty, Donovan had drunk 20 pints of cider and lager, as well as cocktails and double vodkas, leaving him well beyond the drink-drive limit when on duty. Heavy drinking before duties was common practice amongst the crew. According to Smith:

"We were in the control room when someone entered and there was an exchange of words. He stepped out with another man and two shots were fired and then he entered the control room again and began shooting again…. He had a magazine with 30 rounds in it so I took the view that someone had to stop him. I pushed him against the wall and we wrestled, then I pushed him into another wall which resulted in him going to the ground and I managed to get the weapon from him and threw it aside under a table. I shouted for someone to help as I held him down and my chief executive was the first to come, and he did a remarkable job of restraining him."

— Royston Smith, BBC interview

Lieutenant Commander Ian Molyneux, Astute's weapons engineering officer, was killed. Donovan was arrested by Hampshire Constabulary officers and was charged with the murder of Molyneux and the attempted murder of Petty Officer Christopher Brown, Chief Petty Officer David McCoy, and Lieutenant Commander Christopher Hodge. He admitted to the murder of Molyneux and three counts of attempted murder; he was sentenced at Winchester Court on 19 September 2011 to life imprisonment and must serve a minimum of 25 years.

On 23 March 2012, Ian Molyneux, Royston Smith, and Alistair Neill were awarded the George Medal for gallantry. Molyneux's widow received the Elizabeth Cross in April 2013.

=== Weapons trials ===
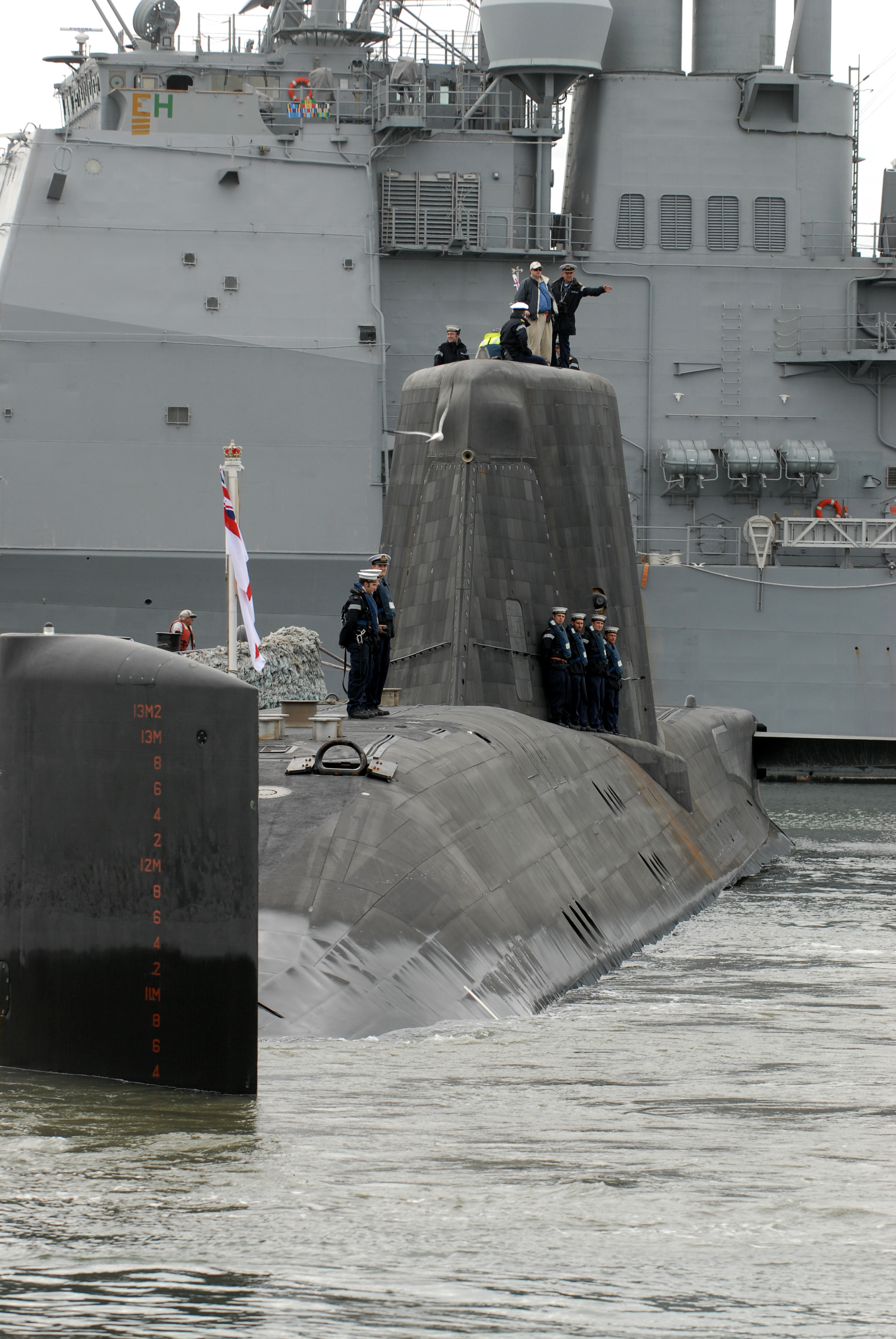
Astute manoeuvring into position at Naval Station Norfolk in Norfolk Virginia, November 2011

Starting in late 2011, she began a 5-month stay at the US Navy's Atlantic Undersea Test and Evaluation Center (AUTEC) in the Bahamas, in which she fired Spearfish torpedoes and Tomahawk missiles. Astute launched two Tomahawks, the first missile on 15 November 2011. They were the Royal Navy's ninth and tenth Tomahawk flight tests.

In February 2012, Astute rendezvoused with the Virginia-class submarine USS New Mexico underwater in the Atlantic Undersea Test and Evaluation Center for a series of war games. Present were the head of the Royal Navy, Admiral Sir Mark Stanhope and the head of the United States Navy, Admiral Jonathan W. Greenert. It was reported that Astute "surpassed expectations" and that the Americans were "taken aback" by Astute's capabilities. Astute had been expected to conduct her first operational deployment in 2013.

=== First of class issues ===
In November 2012 The Guardian reported that there had been a serious leak that caused an emergency surfacing because a cap for a pipe was made of the wrong metal, even though the inventory claimed proper checks had been made, that there were problems with reactor monitoring instruments because the wrong grade of lead was used, and circuit boards had not been correctly fitted. The Ministry of Defence and BAE Systems confirmed the problems were being worked on. An MoD spokesman said "It is normal for first of class trials to identify areas where modifications are required and these are then incorporated into later vessels of the class."

=== Maiden deployment ===
Astute departed Faslane on her maiden deployment at the beginning of 2014, spending eight months abroad. Her deployment included an attached dry deck shelter aft of the sail, possibly for an SBS troop deployment. Astute returned to Faslane in October 2014.

=== Upgrade and return to operations ===
Following her return to Faslane, Astute began a two-year major capability upgrade and sea training period. Her training saw her working with a Canadian maritime patrol aircraft and a NATO submarine in a simulated war environment. Having successfully completed this, Astute was once again declared ready for operations.

In November 2018, Astute took part in anti-submarine warfare exercises alongside Type 23 frigate HMS St Albans in an undisclosed Scottish loch.

In 2025, HMS Astute was initially reported to have joined the Royal Navy's carrier strike group as a participant in Operation HIGHMAST, the Royal Navy's deployment to the Indo-Pacific region. However the submarine was reported to have returned to the U.K. in June leading to speculation that another submarine from her class was possibly deployed with the task group. In July it was confirmed that there were, in fact, no Royal Navy fleet submarines at sea meaning that none was deployed with the task group.

HMS Astute herself was to begin a long-term refit in 2025.
