= Swiftsure-class submarine =

1973 class of British nuclear submarines

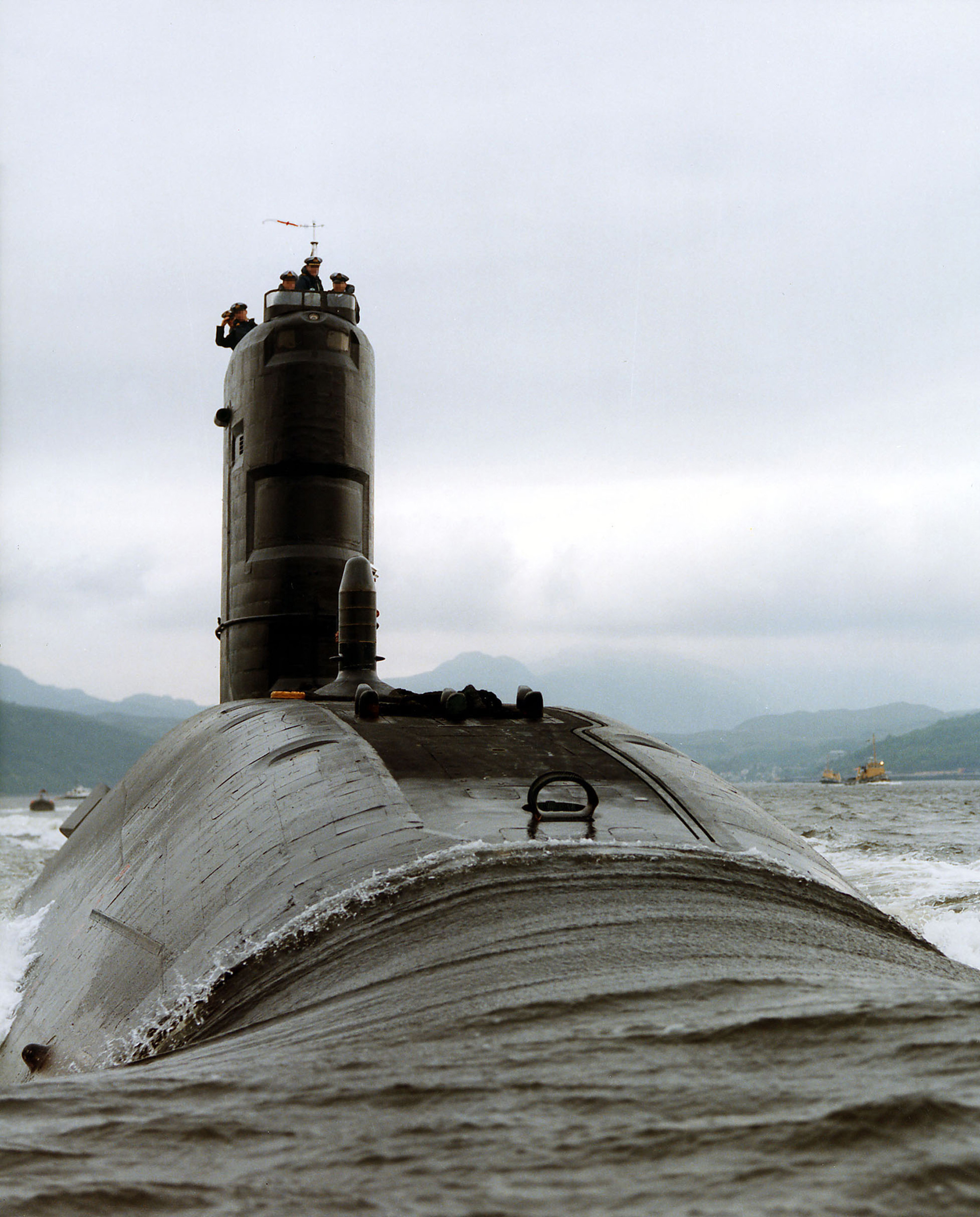
- HMS Spartan in 1993

Class overview
- Name: Swiftsure class
- Builders: Vickers Shipbuilding and Engineering Ltd. (VSEL)
- Operators: Royal Navy
- Preceded by: Churchill class
- Succeeded by: Trafalgar class
- In commission: 17 April 1973 – 10 December 2010
- Completed: 6
- Retired: 6

General characteristics
- Type: Submarine
- Displacement: 4,400 t (4,850.17 short tons) standard; 4,900 t (5,401.33 short tons) submerged
- Length: 82.9 m (272 ft)
- Beam: 9.8 m (32 ft)
- Draught: 8.5 m (28 ft)
- Propulsion: Nuclear Reactor
- Speed: In excess of 28 knots (52 km/h) when dived
- Range: Unlimited (nuclear)
- Complement: 116 (13 officers)
- Sensors & processing systems: Bow, flank, active intercept, and towed array sonar, periscopes (attack and search), collision avoidance radar
- Armament: 5 x 21 inch (533 mm) torpedo tubes; Spearfish torpedoes; RN Sub Harpoon missiles (until c.2004); Tomahawk missiles (not all fitted)

The Swiftsure class was a class of nuclear-powered fleet submarines in service with the Royal Navy from the early 1970s until 2010.

Six boats were built and commissioned. Swiftsure was decommissioned in 1992 due to damage suffered to her pressure hull during trials. Splendid followed in 2004 after defence cuts caused a reduction in the size of the Royal Navy submarine fleet. Spartan was decommissioned in January 2006, with Sovereign following on 12 September 2006. Superb was decommissioned on 26 September 2008. The remaining boat in the class, Sceptre, was decommissioned in December 2010. The six boats of the class were not replaced, although the seven boats of the successor Trafalgar-class submarines are in the process of being replaced by seven boats of the Astute-class submarines.

A few were upgraded with the capability to launch Tomahawk cruise missiles in addition to their original armaments of torpedoes, mines and anti-ship missiles. They were also the first class of Royal Navy submarines to be built with shrouded pump-jet propulsors.

Norman Hancock, RCNC was project manager and lead designer. He described the overall approach to the design as:

"Our aims were to simplify wherever possible by cleaning up and removing all unnecessary duplication and to introduce the necessary improvements which would produce a faster, stealthier, safer, deeper diving and more easily maintainable weapons platform."

== Design history ==
The Dreadnought, Valiant and Churchill classes all had a "whale-shaped hull", of "near-perfect streamlining giving maximum underwater efficiency". The hulls were of British design, "based on the pioneering work of the US Navy in Skipjack and Albacore." The hull of the Swiftsure class was a different shape and maintained its diameter for a much greater length than previous classes. Compared with the Valiants the Swiftsures were 13 ft (4.0 m) "shorter with a fuller form, with the fore-planes set further forward, with one less torpedo tube and with a deeper diving depth."

A second major change was in propulsion. Rather than the seven/nine-bladed propeller used by the previous classes, all but the first of the Swiftsure-class submarines used a shrouded pump-jet propulsor. The prototype propulsor had powered Churchill. It is not clear why Swiftsure was the only one of the class not fitted with a propulsor. The propulsor was perhaps as much as 50% more efficient than a propeller, producing the same speed at lower revolutions, thus reducing the noise signature. In addition all pipework connections to equipment on the main machinery raft had expansion/flexible coupling connections, which also reduced noise. The US Navy secured a licence to copy the main shaft flexible coupling arrangement in US-built submarines.

== Construction programme ==
Pennant number	Name	Builder	Ordered	Laid down	Launched	Accepted into service	Commissioned	Decommissioned	Estimated building cost
S126	Swiftsure	Vickers Shipbuilding and Engineering, Barrow-in-Furness.	3 November 1967	6 June 1969	7 September 1971		17 April 1973	1992	£37,100,000 (equivalent to £132.28 million in 2025)
S108	Sovereign	Vickers Shipbuilding and Engineering, Barrow-in-Furness.	16 May 1969	18 September 1970	17 February 1973	22 July 1974	11 July 1974	12 September 2006	£31,100,000 (equivalent to £82.29 million in 2025)
S109	Superb	Vickers Shipbuilding and Engineering, Barrow-in-Furness.	20 May 1970	16 March 1972	30 November 1974	29 November 1976	13 November 1976	26 September 2008	£41,300,000 (equivalent to £109.28 million in 2025)
S104	Sceptre	Vickers Shipbuilding and Engineering, Barrow-in-Furness.	1 November 1971	19 February 1974	20 November 1976	11 March 1978	14 February 1978	10 December 2010.	£58,900,000 (equivalent to £155.85 million in 2025)
S105	Spartan	Vickers Shipbuilding and Engineering, Barrow-in-Furness.	7 February 1973	26 April 1976	7 April 1978	10 October 1979	22 September 1979	January 2006	£68,900,000 (equivalent to £182.31 million in 2025)
S106	Splendid (ex-Severn)	Vickers Shipbuilding and Engineering, Barrow-in-Furness.	26 May 1976	23 November 1977	5 October 1979	5 May 1981	21 March 1981	2004	£97,000,000 (equivalent to £256.66 million in 2025)

== Operational history ==
=== Combat history ===
Both Splendid and Spartan were ordered to sail south for the Falkland Islands two days before the Argentine invasion of the islands on 30 March 1982. Spartan was the first boat to arrive in the islands and began to enforce a 200-mile (320 km) maritime exclusion zone imposed by the British. Shortly after, Spartan sighted Argentine merchant shipping mining the harbour at Stanley, but was not ordered to attack. This was partly due to British concerns about escalating the war too early, but also to avoid scaring off more valuable targets such as the Argentine aircraft carrier Veinticinco de Mayo. Unlike HMS Conqueror, neither Spartan nor Splendid fired in anger during the Falklands War, but they did provide valuable reconnaissance to the British Task Force on Argentine aircraft movements and the submarines' presence effectively restricted the freedom of action of the Argentine Navy which spent most of the war confined to port.

In the late 1990s, Splendid became the first British vessel to be armed with American-built Tomahawk cruise missiles. In 1999 the BBC was allowed on board the boat to record her firing Tomahawks in battle against Yugoslav targets in Belgrade during the Kosovo War, becoming the first British submarine in the conflict to do so. She again fired these weapons against Iraqi targets in the 2003 invasion of Iraq.

=== Incidents ===
In the early 1980s Sceptre collided with a Soviet submarine and her reactor's protection systems would have performed an automatic emergency shutdown (scrammed the reactor), but her captain ordered the safety mechanisms overridden (battleshort enabled). The crew were told to say that they had hit an iceberg. This incident was disclosed when David Forghan, Sceptre's former weapons officer, gave a television interview which was broadcast on 19 September 1991. The Soviet submarine involved was probably K-211 Petropavlovsk-Kamchatsky of the Delta III class, which on 23 May 1981 collided with an unknown submarine, identified at the time as an unknown American Sturgeon-class submarine.

Sovereign underwent an extensive refit in the mid-1990s and was rededicated in January 1997. Cracks were discovered in the tailshaft during post-refit sea trials and she was sent to Rosyth for 14 weeks of emergency repairs in June 1998 before returning to Faslane.

On 6 March 2000 Sceptre suffered a serious accident while inside a drydock at the Rosyth yards while undergoing trials towards the end of a major refit. The test involved flooding the drydock, and running the main engines slowly with steam supplied from the shore. However, too much steam was used and the engines over-sped. Sceptre broke her moorings and moved forward off the cradle she rested on. The steam line ruptured, scaffolding buckled, a crane was pushed forward some 15 feet (4.6 m), and the submarine moved forward some 20 metres (66 ft) inside the dock.

On 26 May 2008, Superb hit an underwater pinnacle in the Red Sea, 80 miles (130 km) south of the Suez Canal. She remained watertight, and none of the 112 crew were injured; however, she was unable to resubmerge due to damage to her sonar. After undertaking initial repairs at the Souda Bay NATO base on Crete on 10 June 2008, she passed through the Mediterranean, with a pause (at night) some miles off Gibraltar to disembark some less critical crew. Superb then continued back to the UK, arriving at HMNB Devonport on 28 June 2008. After surveying the damage, the Royal Navy decided to decommission Superb slightly ahead of schedule on 26 September 2008.

== In fiction ==
HMS Sceptre acts as a nom de guerre for the Red October in Tom Clancy's eponymous novel, as she enters the Norfolk Naval Station.

== See also ==
- List of submarines of the Royal Navy
