= HMS Superb (S109) =

Swiftsure-class nuclear-powered fleet submarine of the Royal Navy

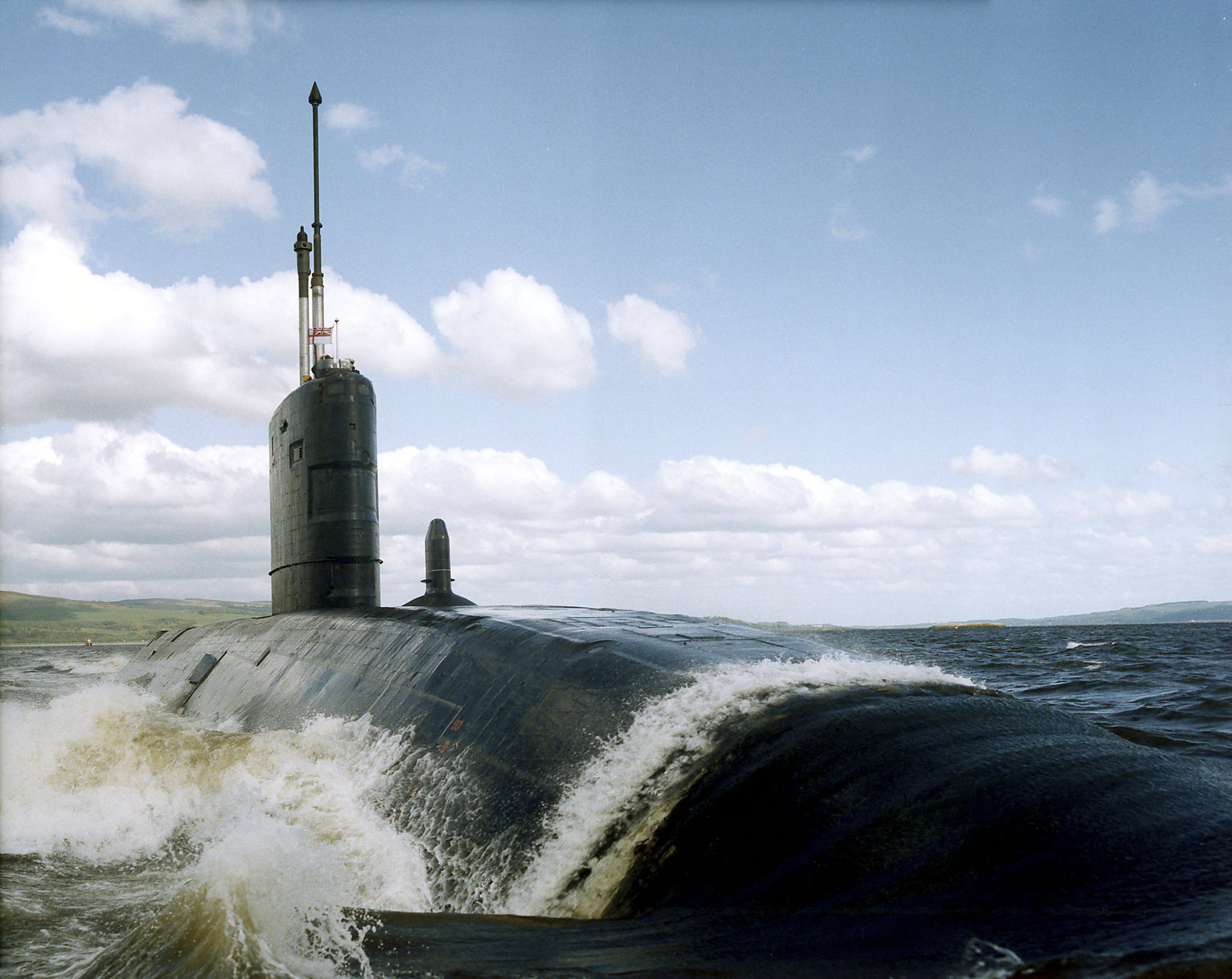
- HMS Superb on the Clyde in Scotland.

History

United Kingdom
- Name: HMS Superb
- Ordered: 20 May 1970
- Builder: Vickers
- Laid down: 16 March 1972
- Launched: 30 November 1974
- Commissioned: 13 November 1976
- Decommissioned: 26 September 2008
- Home port: Faslane
- Identification: Pennant number: S109
- Motto: With Strength and Courage
- Nickname(s): Super B
- Status: Decommissioned at Devonport
- Badge

General characteristics
- Class & type: Swiftsure-class submarine
- Displacement: 4,900 tonnes (dived)
- Length: 82.9 m (272 ft 0 in)
- Beam: 9.8 m (32 ft 2 in)
- Draught: 8.5 m (27 ft 11 in)
- Propulsion: 1 × Rolls-Royce pressurised water nuclear reactor (PWR1)
- Speed: In excess of 20 knots (37 km/h), dived
- Complement: 116 officers and men
- Armament: 5 × 21 in (533 mm) torpedo tubes; Spearfish torpedoes; RN Sub Harpoon missiles

HMS Superb was a nuclear-powered fleet submarine of the Swiftsure class serving in the Royal Navy.

HMS Superb was built by Vickers Shipbuilding Group, now a division of BAE Systems Submarine Solutions. Superb was launched on 30 November 1974 at Barrow-in-Furness, Cumbria and commissioned into the Royal Navy on 13 November 1976. After being damaged in May 2008 in the Red Sea, she returned to HMNB Devonport where she was decommissioned slightly ahead of schedule on 26 September 2008.

== Operations ==
She was the first British submarine to visit the Arctic Ocean and sail under the polar ice caps.

During the Falklands War, Superb was spotted sailing from Gibraltar, which prompted press speculation that she was sailing to the South Atlantic to enforce a maritime exclusion zone. In fact, only Spartan was sailing south at that time but the speculation was useful to promote the apparent threat of the Royal Navy in the South Atlantic and was not corrected by the Navy or Ministry of Defence.

Superb operated in the Indian Ocean in 2001, in support of Operation Veritas, part of the War in Afghanistan.

In January 2008 a sentry was found sleeping while on watch; the reprimand to the crew was caught on video.

=== 2008 underwater pinnacle collision ===
On 26 May 2008 Superb hit an underwater pinnacle in the Red Sea, 80 miles (130 km) south of the Suez Canal. She remained watertight, and none of the 112 crew were injured; however, she was unable to re-submerge due to damage to her sonar. After undertaking initial repairs at the Souda Bay NATO base on Crete on 10 June 2008, she passed through the Mediterranean Sea, with a pause (at night) some miles off Gibraltar to disembark some less critical crew. Superb then continued back to the UK, arriving at Devonport Dockyard on 28 June 2008. After surveying the damage, the Royal Navy decided to decommission Superb slightly ahead of schedule on 26 September 2008.

Nearly two years after the grounding, Superb's commanding officer at the time of the accident and two other officers were reprimanded for their roles in the collision. All three pleaded guilty to the charges of neglecting to perform their duty in failing to notice that the submarine was traveling towards the pinnacle. Despite the incident, all three officers were still serving in the Royal Navy at the time of the court-martial.

== See also ==
- Major submarine incidents since 2000
  - 2005 USS San Francisco (SSN-711) seamount collision
  - 2021 USS Connecticut (SSN-22) seamount collision
