= HMS Artful (S121) =

Astute-class nuclear-powered attack submarine of the Royal Navy

History

United Kingdom
- Name: HMS Artful
- Ordered: March 1997
- Builder: BAE Systems Submarine Solutions
- Laid down: 11 March 2005
- Launched: 17 May 2014
- Sponsored by: Lady Zambellas
- Christened: 20 September 2013
- Commissioned: 18 March 2016
- Identification: Pennant number: S121
- Badge

General characteristics
- Class & type: Astute-class fleet submarine
- Displacement: Surfaced: 7,000 to 7,400 t (7,300 long tons; 8,200 short tons); Submerged: 7,400 to 7,800 t (7,700 long tons; 8,600 short tons)
- Length: 97 m (318 ft 3 in)
- Beam: 11.3 m (37 ft 1 in)
- Draught: 10 m (32 ft 10 in)
- Propulsion: 1 × Rolls-Royce PWR 2 nuclear reactor, HEU 93.5%; MTU 600 kilowatt diesel generators
- Speed: 30 kn (56 km/h; 35 mph), submerged
- Range: Unlimited
- Endurance: 90 days
- Test depth: Over 300 m (984 ft 3 in)
- Complement: 98 (capacity for 109)
- Sensors & processing systems: Thales Sonar 2076; Atlas DESO 25 echosounder; 2 × Thales CM010 optronic masts; Raytheon Successor IFF
- Armament: 6 × 21 in (533 mm) torpedo tubes with stowage for up to 38 weapons: Tomahawk Block IV cruise missiles; Spearfish heavyweight torpedoes

HMS Artful is the third Astute-class nuclear-powered fleet submarine of the British Royal Navy. She is the second submarine of the Royal Navy to bear this name. Artful was ordered from GEC's Marconi Marine (now BAE Systems Submarine Solutions) on 17 March 1997, and was constructed at Barrow in Furness. She was named on 20 September 2013, was rolled out of the shipyard construction hall on 16 May 2014, and was due to start sea trials in early 2015. Artful made her first successful basin dive in October 2014, and sailed on 13 August 2015 for sea trials. Artful was handed over the Royal Navy on 14 December 2015, and commissioned on 18 March 2016. As of June 2026, it has last been to sea in early 2023.

== Design ==
=== Propulsion ===
Artful's nuclear reactor will not need to be refuelled during the boat's 25-year service. Since the submarine can purify water and air, she will be able to circumnavigate the planet without resurfacing. The main limit is that the submarine will only be able to carry three months' supply of food for 98 officers and ratings.

=== Armament ===
Artful has provision for up-to 38 weapons in six 21-inch (533 mm) torpedo tubes. The submarine is capable of using Tomahawk Block IV land-attack missiles with a range of 1,000 miles (1,600 kilometres) and Spearfish heavyweight torpedoes.

=== Common Combat System ===
Artful is the first Astute-class submarine to utilise the Common Combat System, which will be fitted on every Astute, Vanguard and Dreadnought-class submarine. The Common Combat System was originally meant to be first tested on the fourth Astute boat, Audacious, but the system was completed ahead of time.

== Operational history ==
In May 2021, Artful joined UK Carrier Strike Group 21 on its seven-and-a-half month-long maiden operational deployment to the Far East.

As of mid-2024, Artful had been in a period of prolonged inactivity, having last been to sea in early 2023.
