= HMS Splendid (S106) =

Swiftsure-class nuclear-powered fleet submarine of the Royal Navy

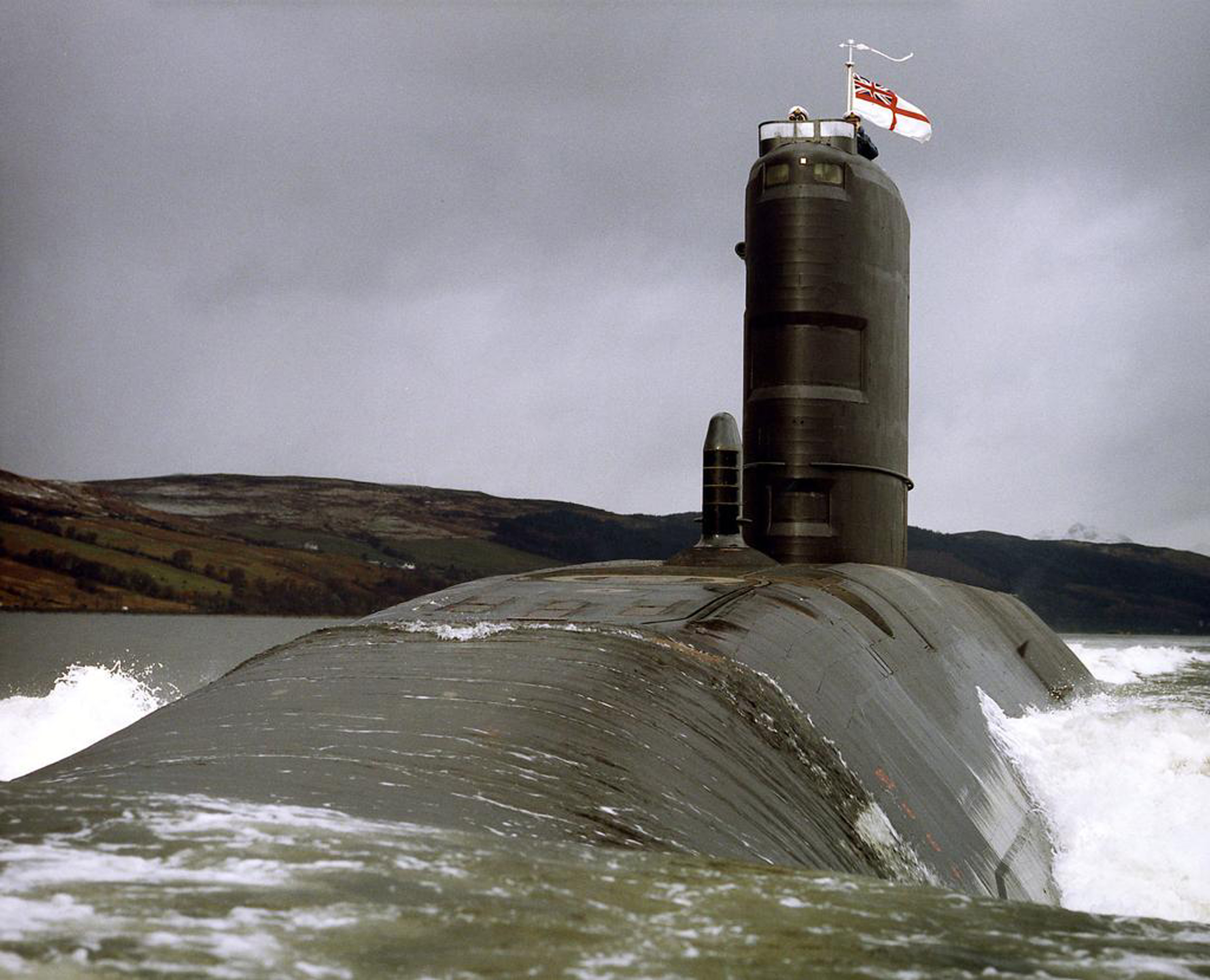
- HMS Splendid pictured off HMNB Clyde in March 1995

History

United Kingdom
- Name: HMS Splendid (ex Severn)
- Operator: Royal Navy
- Ordered: 26 May 1976
- Builder: Vickers
- Laid down: 23 November 1977
- Launched: 5 October 1979
- Commissioned: 21 March 1981
- Decommissioned: 2004
- Motto: Splendidly Audacious
- Status: Awaiting Disposal
- Badge

General characteristics
- Class & type: Swiftsure-class submarine
- Displacement: 4,900 tonnes (dived)
- Length: 82.9 m (272 ft 0 in)
- Beam: 9.8 m (32 ft 2 in)
- Draught: 8.5 m (27 ft 11 in)
- Propulsion: One Rolls-Royce pressurised water nuclear reactor (PWR1); Two WH Allen turbo generators; One Paxman diesel alternator; One emergency drive motor
- Speed: In excess of 20 knots (37 km/h), dived
- Complement: 116 officers and men
- Armament: 5 × 21 in (533 mm) torpedo tubes; Spearfish torpedoes; RN Sub Harpoon missiles; Tomahawk cruise missiles

HMS Splendid was a Royal Navy, nuclear-powered, fleet submarine of the Swiftsure class. From her commissioning in 1979 to decommission in 2004, she took part in many operations involving British forces around the globe.

== Construction ==
HMS Splendid was ordered on 26 May 1976 as the sixth and last submarine of the Swiftsure class. The submarine was laid down at Vickers Shipbuilding Groups, Barrow-in-Furness, shipyard on 23 November 1977 and was launched on 5 October 1979 by Lady Eberle, wife of Admiral Sir James Eberle, then Commander-in-Chief Fleet. Splendid commissioned on 21 March 1981 under the command of Commander R. C. Lane-Nott.

== Operational history ==
Her first major conflict came in 1982 during the Falklands War, when Argentinian forces invaded the British Falkland Islands. Splendid was one of the first submarines to reach the islands, arriving mid-April, after sailing from Faslane. Unlike HMS Conqueror, Splendid did not directly engage Argentinian forces, but she shadowed the Argentine aircraft carrier 25 de Mayo, with Splendid running within a mile outside of the Argentinian territorial line, 12 miles (19 km) off its Atlantic Coast. The captain of Splendid claimed that running on the edge of the exclusion zone around the Falklands, declared by the UK government, he had the right in international law and approval from the British prime minister (PM), to fire at 25 de Mayo, a few miles away within Argentine waters, and would have fired MK 8 torpedoes at 25 de Mayo, if he had confirmed his precise position. Just at the moment, though, he lost sight through the periscope of the carrier and was not immediately able to regain contact. The naval commander of the task force, Admiral Sandy Woodward, does not appear to be entirely clear, that Splendid had the right to fire, but says he established, against his prior view, that Splendid had orders to engage and approval of the PM. Splendid did however provide valuable reconnaissance to the British Task Force on Argentine aircraft movements. The sinking of General Belgrano effectively restricted the freedom of action of the Argentine Navy, which spent most of the war confined to port.

In November 1998, the Royal Navy attained initial operational capability for the American-built Tomahawk cruise missile with the missile's deployment aboard Splendid. In March 1999, Splendid fired Tomahawks in battle against Serbian targets when NATO forces intervened in the Kosovo War, becoming the first British submarine in the conflict to do so; she fired 20 Tomahawks throughout the war. She again fired these weapons against Iraqi targets in the 2003 invasion of Iraq.

In July 2003, Splendid returned to her home at Faslane Naval Base on the River Clyde in Scotland. The youngest of the Swiftsure vessels, she was decommissioned in HMNB Devonport, Plymouth, in 2004. Commander Burke was later awarded the Order of the British Empire for his leadership of HMS Splendid in the Gulf.

== Alleged involvement in the loss of Kursk ==
HMS Splendid was alleged by Russian officials to have been present, along with the US Navy submarines USS Memphis and USS Toledo at the Russian war games during which the Russian submarine Kursk exploded and sank, resulting in the loss of that submarine and all 118 sailors and officers on board. Despite the conclusions of independent forensic inquiries and the eventual corroborating admission by the Russian Navy that the explosion was triggered by a faulty torpedo on board the Kursk, various conspiracy theories posit that Kursk was actually sunk by one of the US or British submarines. This may partly stem from the Russian Navy's initial attempts to shunt away criticism of its failed efforts to rescue the surviving crew members from the ocean floor and of the generally poor condition of its own equipment, which was eventually found to be the cause of both the sinking and the failure of the Russian rescue attempts. In the days immediately after the explosion, Russia suggested that the cause of the disaster was a collision with one of the US or British submarines present. Though the accusation proved to be unfounded, conspiracy theorists have picked up on and elaborated it in various directions over time.

== Commanding officers ==
From	To	Captain
1981	1982	Commander Roger Lane-Nott RN
1987	1988	Commander Mark Stanhope RN
1994	1997	Commander Ken Clark RN
1997	1999	Commander Ian Corder RN

=== Further reading ===
- Moore, John (1985). Jane's Fighting Ships 1985–86. Jane's Yearbooks. ISBN 978-0-710-60814-7.
- Polmar, N. (2008). Aircraft Carriers: A History of Carrier Aviation, Vol. 2, 1946–2006. Washington, DC: Potomac Books. ISBN 978-1-574-88665-8.
- Woodward, Sandy; Robinson, Patrick (2012). One Hundred Days: The Memoirs of the Falklands Fleet Commander. London: Harper. ISBN 978-0-007-43640-8.
