= HMS Walrus (S08) =

Submarine of the Royal Navy

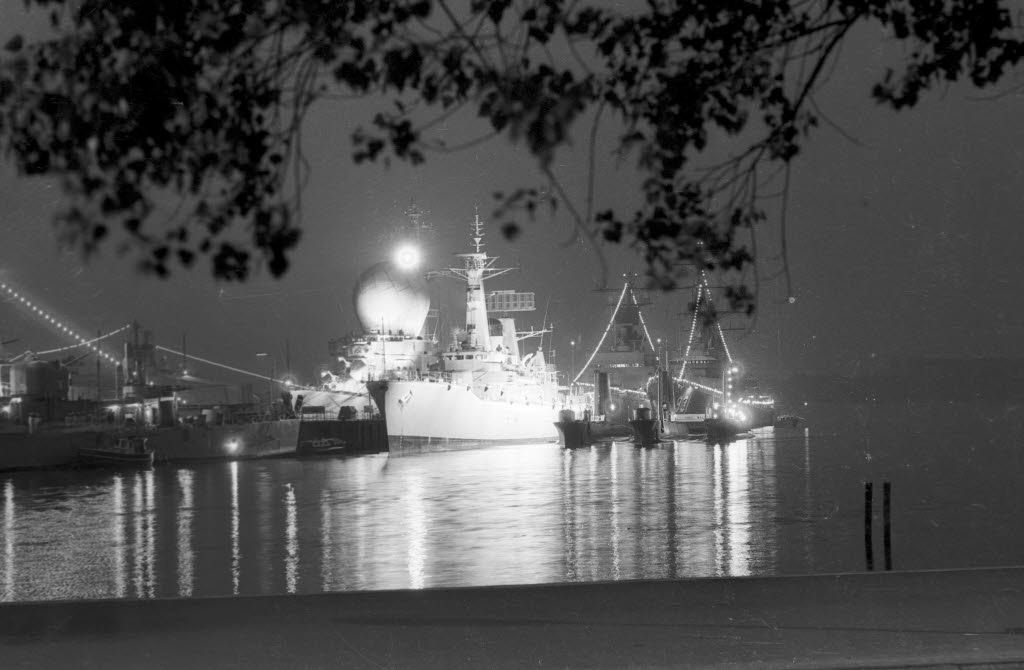
- HMS Walrus (S08) and other ships in Kiel harbour, Germany

History

United Kingdom
- Name: HMS Walrus
- Builder: Scotts Shipbuilding and Engineering Company, Greenock
- Laid down: 12 February 1958
- Launched: 22 September 1959
- Commissioned: 10 February 1961
- Fate: Sold in 1987; Broken up in 1991

General characteristics
- Class & type: Porpoise class submarine
- Displacement: 2,080 tons surfaced; 2,450 tons submerged
- Length: 290 ft (88 m)
- Beam: 26 ft 7 in (8.10 m)
- Draught: 18 ft (5.5 m)
- Propulsion: 2 × Admiralty Standard range diesel generators, 1,650 hp (1.230 MW); 2 × English Electric main motors, 12,000 hp (8.95 MW); 2 shafts
- Speed: 12 kn (22 km/h) surfaced; 17 kn (31 km/h)submerged
- Range: 9,000 nmi (17,000 km) at 12 kn (22 km/h)
- Complement: 71
- Armament: 8 × 21 inch (533 mm) torpedo tubes, 6 bow, 2 stern; 30 × Mk8 or Mk23 torpedoes, later the Mark 24 Tigerfish

HMS Walrus (S08) was the last of the Porpoise class submarines of the Royal Navy. She was launched on 22 September 1959, and commissioned on 10 February 1961.

== Royal Navy Service ==
On one occasion during exercises with HMS Ark Royal (R09) an error resulted in a practice torpedo becoming embedded in the submarine's casing.

Following an 18-month refit at Devonport Dockyard she commissioned for the third time on 3 December 1969. In 1970 she was present at Portsmouth Navy Days Walrus also attended the 1977 Silver Jubilee Fleet Review off Spithead when she was part of the Submarine Flotilla.

She was sold in 1987 to the Seaforth Group to be refitted for resale to Egypt, but was broken up at Grimsby in 1991.

== Notable commanding officers ==
Notable commanding officers include Lieutenant Commander John Fieldhouse (1961–1962) and Lieutenant Commander Roger Lane-Nott (1974–1976).

== Publications ==
- Colledge, J. J.; Warlow, Ben (2006) [1969]. Ships of the Royal Navy: The Complete Record of All Fighting Ships of the Royal Navy from the 15th Century to the Present (3rd Rev ed.). London: Chatham Publishing. ISBN 978-1-86176-281-8. OCLC 67375475.
