= HMS Swiftsure (S126) =

Swiftsure-class nuclear-powered fleet submarine of the Royal Navy

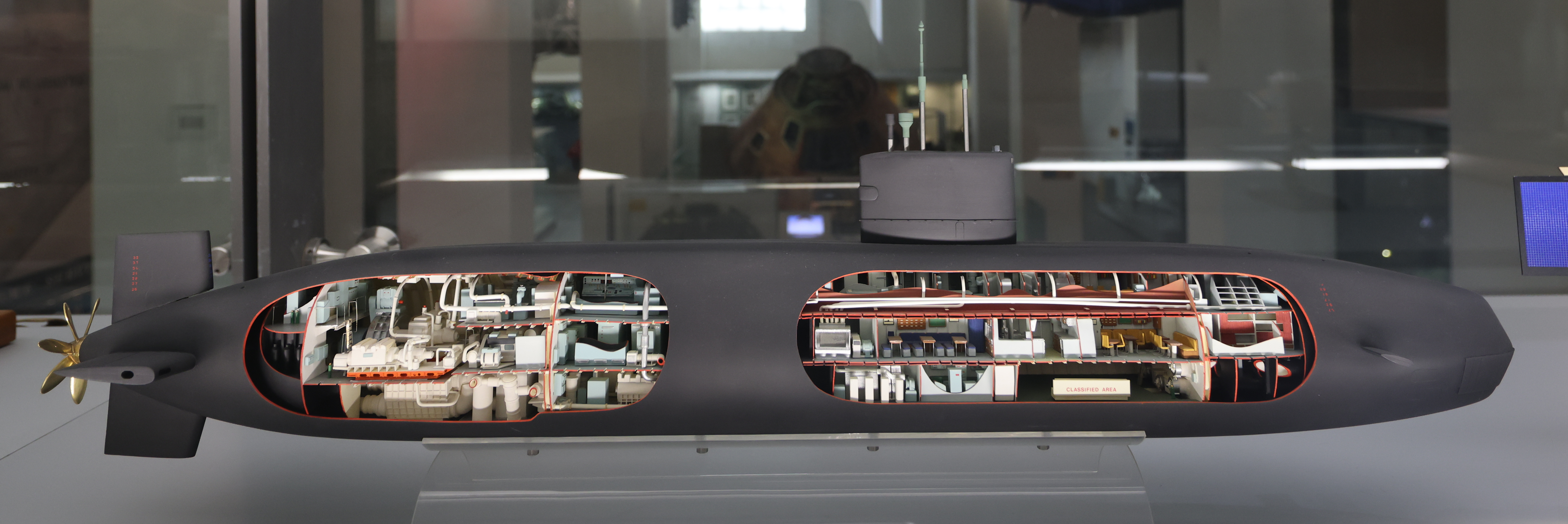
- Cut-away model of HMS Swiftsure

History

United Kingdom
- Name: HMS Swiftsure
- Ordered: 3 November 1967
- Builder: Vickers
- Laid down: 6 June 1969
- Launched: 7 September 1971
- Commissioned: 17 April 1973
- Decommissioned: 1992
- Identification: Pennant number: S126
- Fate: Decommissioned
- Badge

General characteristics
- Class & type: Swiftsure-class submarine
- Displacement: 4,900 tonnes (dived)
- Length: 82.9 m (272 ft 0 in)
- Beam: 9.8 m (32 ft 2 in)
- Draught: 8.5 m (27 ft 11 in)
- Speed: In excess of 20 knots (37 km/h), dived
- Complement: 116 officers and men
- Armament: 5 × 21 inch (533 mm) torpedo tubes; Spearfish torpedoes; Harpoon missiles

HMS Swiftsure was the lead ship of her class of nuclear attack submarines (fleet submarines in Royal Navy parlance). Entering Royal Navy service in 1973, she served until 1992.

== Construction and design ==
Swiftsure was ordered on 3 November 1967, as the first of her class, and laid down at Vickers Armstrongs Barrow-in-Furness shipyard on 6 June 1969. She was launched on 7 September 1971 and commissioned on 17 April 1973. The cost of building Swiftsure was £37.1 million.

== Service ==
Swiftsure became famous for her mission to acquire the acoustic signature of the Soviet aircraft carrier Kiev. Upon locating a new unique acoustic sound that indicated the Kiev's presence, she hid underneath the aircraft carrier for several hours, with her raised periscope just 10 feet (3.0 m) under the aircraft carrier's hull, allowing the crew of Swiftsure to take photographs and record the aircraft carrier's acoustic signature. This was documented in 2013 as part of the BBC's Cold War season.

Swiftsure arrived in HMNB Devonport in January 1979 for her first scheduled refit. However, due to an industrial dispute the refit did not begin until April 1980, 15 months after the boat arrived into Devonport. Despite a statement in the House of Commons in mid-November 1981 that the refit would be completed by mid-1982 Swiftsure's refit was eventually completed in March 1983, at a total cost of £85 million.

Swiftsure was due to enter a second refit in 1992, but instead she was decommissioned that year. The reason for the premature decommissioning is often cited as pressure hull damage suffered during sea trials although that is now thought to be incorrect; it is believed the reason for the boat's premature decommissioning was due to the finding of cracks in her reactor during a refit. Her nuclear core was safely removed in June 1992.

Since 1992, she has been stored afloat in the non-tidal basin at Rosyth dockyard, awaiting dismantling under MoD's Submarine Dismantling Project (SDP). She has undergone periodic dockings for re-preservation and maintenance inspections, the latest from August 2016 onwards. She will be the first, or 'demonstrator' submarine to undergo Initial Dismantling through the SDP. As of 2023, it was reported that the process would take until the end of 2026 to complete. As of October 2024, the final dismantling process was about to start. The submarine was still planned to be fully dismantled by end of 2026.

== Publications ==
- Moore, John, ed. (1985). Jane's Fighting Ships 1985–86. London: Jane's Yearbooks. ISBN 0-7106-0814-4.
