= HMS Spartan (S105) =

Swiftsure-class nuclear-powered fleet submarine of the Royal Navy

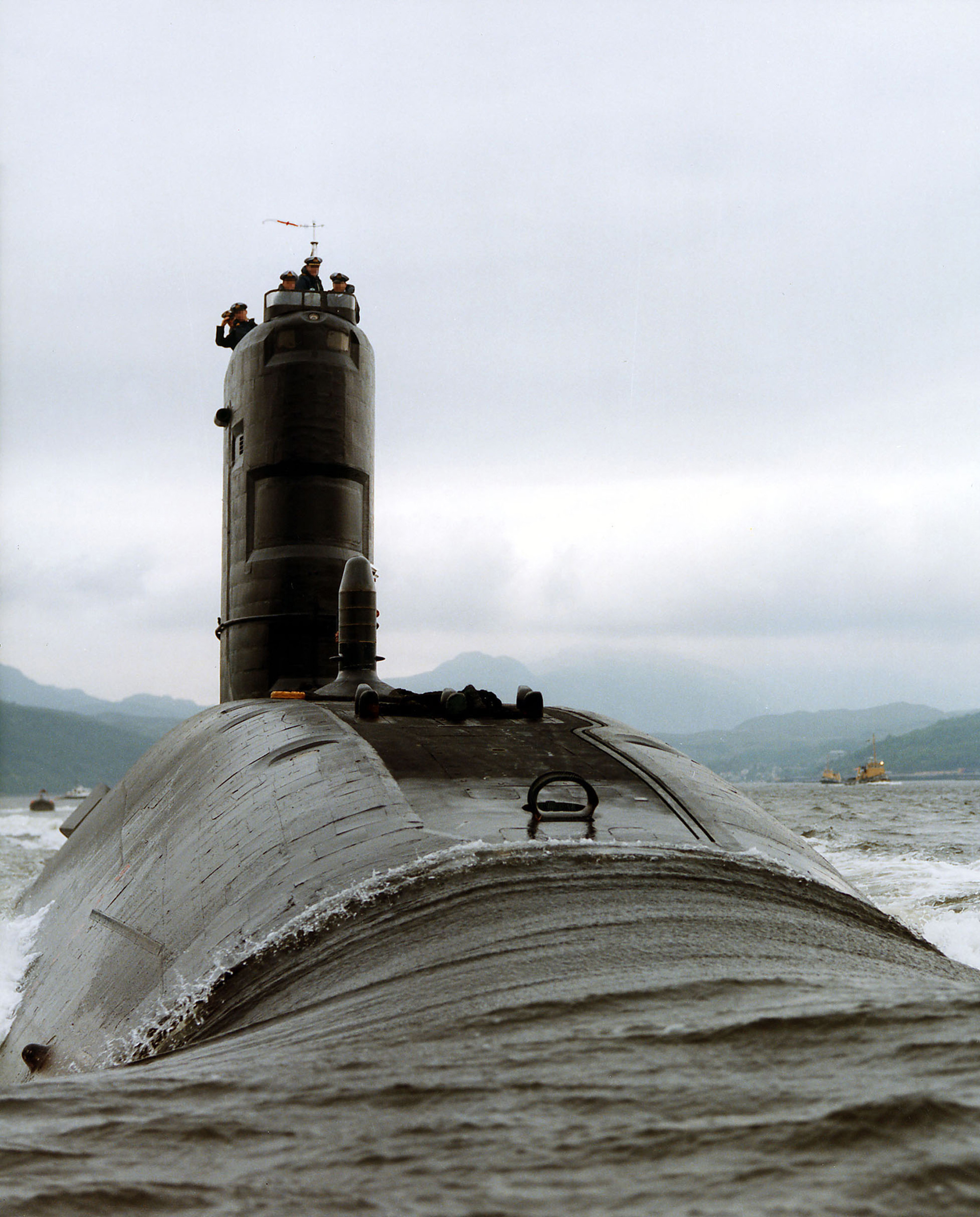
- HMS Spartan in 1993

History

United Kingdom
- Name: HMS Spartan
- Ordered: 7 February 1976
- Builder: Vickers
- Laid down: 26 April 1976
- Launched: 7 May 1978
- Commissioned: 22 September 1979
- Decommissioned: January 2006
- Identification: Pennant number: S105
- Motto: Courage With Great Endurance
- Fate: Paid off
- Badge

General characteristics
- Class & type: Swiftsure-class submarine
- Displacement: 4,900 tonnes (dived)
- Length: 82.9 m (272 ft 0 in)
- Beam: 9.8 m (32 ft 2 in)
- Draught: 8.5 m (27 ft 11 in)
- Propulsion: Rolls-Royce pressurised water nuclear reactor (PWR1)
- Speed: In excess of 20 knots (37 km/h), dived
- Complement: 116 officers and ratings
- Armament: 5 × 21 in (533 mm) torpedo tubes; Spearfish torpedoes; RN Sub Harpoon missiles; Tomahawk cruise missiles

HMS Spartan was a nuclear-powered fleet submarine of the Royal Navy's Swiftsure class. Spartan was launched on 7 April 1978 by Lady Lygo, wife of Admiral Sir Raymond Lygo. The boat was built by Vickers Limited Shipbuilding Group (now a division of BAE Systems) at Barrow-in-Furness in Cumbria, England. She was decommissioned in January 2006.

== Operational history ==
Spartan was ordered to sail south for the Falkland Islands two days before the Argentine invasion of the islands on 30 March 1982. Spartan was the first vessel to arrive in the islands and began to enforce a 200-mile (320 km) maritime exclusion zone imposed by the British. Shortly after, Spartan sighted Argentine merchant shipping mining the harbour at Stanley, but was not ordered to attack. This was partly due to British concerns about escalating the war too early, but also to avoid scaring off more lucrative targets such as the Argentine aircraft carrier Veinticinco de Mayo. On 1 May, Spartan was marking Veinticinco de Mayo, from just outside the Argentinian 12-mile (19 km) limit, when the submarine was ordered away by the Northwood fleet command in England, rejecting the strong view of the task force commander, Admiral Woodward. He considered, as the highest ranking naval officer in the area, he should control the RN submarines in the area and potentially faced losing the war by the lack of local control in the battle zone In the following days Veinticinco de Mayo was therefore able to move, unchecked by the British nuclear submarines, and potentially launch an A-4Q Skyhawk attack from much closer range than possible from Argentinian airfields. Unlike HMS Conqueror, Spartan did not fire in anger during the Falklands War, though she did provide valuable reconnaissance to the British Task Force on Argentine aircraft movements.

In November 2010, it was reported in Hansard that Spartan had run aground off the west coast of Scotland in October 1989.

In 1999, Spartan was fitted with Tomahawk cruise missiles.
