= Photonics mast =

External optical sensor on a submarine which functions similarly to a periscope

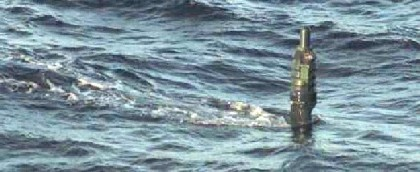
A photonics mast aboard a Virginia-class submarine

A photonics mast (or optronics mast) is a sensor on a submarine which functions similarly to a periscope without requiring a periscope tube, thus freeing design space during construction and limiting risks of water leakage in the event of damage. A photonics mast replaces the mechanical, line-of-sight viewing system with digital equipment, similar to a digital camera array, and it has fewer locational and dimensional constraints than a traditional periscope.

Unlike a periscope, it need not be located directly above its user, and it requires only a small pressure hull penetration for cabling. This allows the photonics mast to fit entirely within the sail of the submarine and means the control room need not be placed directly below the sail.

A photonics mast operates by rising above the water in a manner similar to a telescoping antenna and provides information through an array of sensors, such as high-definition low-light and thermographic cameras. Images and information can appear on display panels for analysis. The photonics mast can also support the navigation, electronic warfare, and communications functions of a conventional optical-periscope mast.

== Photonics masts by country ==
=== Chinese Navy ===
At least the Type 039B/C submarines are fitted with photonics masts.

=== French Navy ===
The Marine Nationale's new nuclear attack submarines, the Suffren class, comes with an optronics mast with the following sensors:

- High resolution day camera
- 3rd generation MWIR camera in 3-5 μm band
- Low light level camera (LLLTV) for night use in the visible spectrum with anti-glare system
- Laser rangefinder

The mast is manufactured by Sagem (now Safran). The same mast can be found on the export oriented Scorpène-class conventional attack submarines made by Naval Group.

=== Japan Maritime Self-Defense Force ===
The Sōryū-class submarine is equipped with the CM010 optronics mast.

=== Royal Navy ===
The Royal Navy tested an optronic mast on the Trafalgar-class HMS Trenchant in 1998.

Astute-class nuclear attack submarines are equipped with two Thales CM010 optronics mast similar in capabilities to the Sagem model in French use.

=== Russian Navy ===
The Yasen and Borei-class submarines are fitted with photonics masts developed by Shvabe, a subsidiary of Rostec. The Elektropribor Central Research Institute has also developed the Parus-98 photonics mast for the conventional Lada-class submarines and the export market (Parus-98E).

=== United States Navy ===
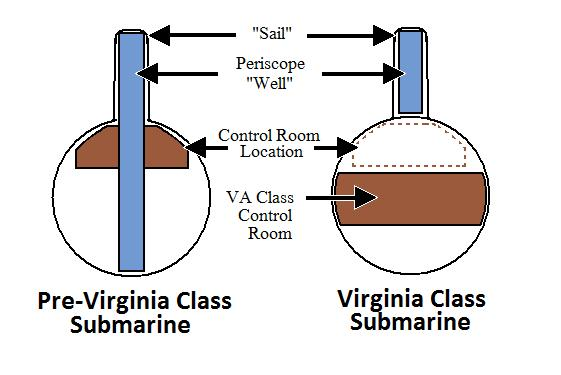
Comparison in design of periscope well and sail.

In 2004, the United States Navy began fitting photonics masts to Virginia-class submarines.

According to the US Navy:

In Virginia-class boats, traditional periscopes have been supplanted by two Photonics Masts that house color, high-resolution black and white, and infrared digital cameras atop telescoping arms. With the removal of the barrel periscopes, the ships’ control room has been moved down one deck and away from the hull’s curvature, affording it more room and an improved layout that provides the commanding officer with enhanced situational awareness.
