= Spearfish torpedo =

Royal Navy torpedo deployed in 1992

Spearfish
- Type: Heavyweight dual-purpose ASW and ASuW torpedo
- Place of origin: United Kingdom

Service history
- In service: 1992–present
- Used by: Royal Navy

Production history
- Manufacturer: BAE Systems Underwater Systems
- Produced: 1988–2003, 2020- present
- No. built: 550 produced

Specifications
- Mass: 1,850 kg (4,080 lb)
- Length: 7 m (23 ft)
- Diameter: 533 mm (21 in)
- Maximum firing range: 30 nmi (56 km)
- Warhead: Aluminised PBX explosive
- Warhead weight: 300 kg (660 lb)
- Detonation mechanism: Proximity or contact detonation
- Engine: Sundstrand gas-turbine with pump-jet
- Propellant: HAP / Otto fuel II
- Maximum speed: 80-knot (148 km/h)
- Guidance system: Wire-guided with autonomous active terminal homing sonar
- Launch platform: submarine

The Spearfish torpedo (formally Naval Staff Target 7525) is the heavy torpedo used by the submarines of the Royal Navy. It can be guided by wire or by autonomous active or passive sonar, and provides both anti-submarine warfare (ASW) and anti-surface warfare (ASuW) capability. Spearfish development began in the 1970s, with production starting in 1988, and deployment in 1992. By 2004 the new weapon had completely replaced the older Tigerfish torpedo.

== Design ==
The torpedo is driven by a pump-jet coupled to a Hamilton Sundstrand 21TP04 gas turbine engine using Otto fuel II and hydroxylammonium perchlorate as oxidiser. The addition of an oxidiser improves the specific energy of the fuel by reducing the fuel-richness of the Otto fuel. The Spearfish, which are capable of travelling at 80 knots (150 km/h; 92 mph), were designed to catch high-speed, deep-diving Soviet threats such as the Alfa-class submarine.

A microprocessor enables the torpedo to make autonomous tactical decisions during the attack. It has a powerful blast warhead, triggered by either contact detonation (against a submarine hull) or an acoustic proximity fuse (for under-keel detonation against ships). A standoff detonation under the keel enhances blast effects against surface ships through the amplification of stress resulting from the interaction of the explosion's products and the flexible structure of the ship.

== Guidance ==
In a typical engagement, Spearfish will run out wire-guided to the general vicinity of the target and then conduct a covert passive search. The high-capacity guide wire system, specifically designed to match the Spearfish's manoeuvre and speed envelope, provides two-way data exchange between the torpedo and launch submarine, maximising the submarine's organic sensor and combat control capabilities.

Once at close range the Spearfish uses active sonar to classify and home in on its target. High-power transmissions and sophisticated signal processing enable Spearfish to accurately discriminate targets from background noise and ensure high resistance to acoustic countermeasures and/or evasive manoeuvres.

Should Spearfish fail to hit the target on its first attack, it automatically selects an appropriate re-attack mode until it successfully concludes the engagement.

== Testing ==
Tactical software has been extensively refined through real-time, hardware in the loop simulations and demonstrated in more than 500 in-water trials and exercise firings.

== Production ==
The production contract for the Spearfish Torpedo was placed with GEC-Marconi Underwater Systems Ltd (now BAE Systems) in 1983, following a development programme lasting several years. Spearfish entered full production in 1988.

== Deployment ==
The first Spearfish were deployed in 1992, with deliveries completed in 2003; the number ordered has not been revealed. Spearfish torpedoes are stored and serviced at Beith Ordnance Storage facility in North Ayrshire.

== Upgrade ==
In 2009, an upgrade programme began, leading to further sophisticated advances in Spearfish's homing, warheads, tactical and fuelling systems, as well as an upgraded guidance link. This will last until 2019.

On 15 December 2014, the Ministry of Defence awarded BAE Systems a £270 million contract to upgrade the Spearfish torpedo. The upgrade includes a new insensitive-munition warhead from TDW, a change to the fuel system to improve safety, full digitisation of the weapon and a new fibre optic guidance link to improve performance. The upgraded 'MOD 1' torpedoes will enter service between 2020 and 2024. In February 2021 HMS Talent test fired 3 upgraded 'MOD 1' specification Spearfish torpedoes as part of their final testing before entry into service with the Royal Navy, whilst Vanguard-class trials were carried out in 2024.

== See also ==
- Black Shark torpedo
- DM2A4 heavyweight torpedo
- Mark 48 torpedo
- Varunastra (torpedo)
- Yu-6 torpedo
