= USS Casimir Pulaski =

Submarine of the United States

USS Casimir Pulaski (SSBN-633)
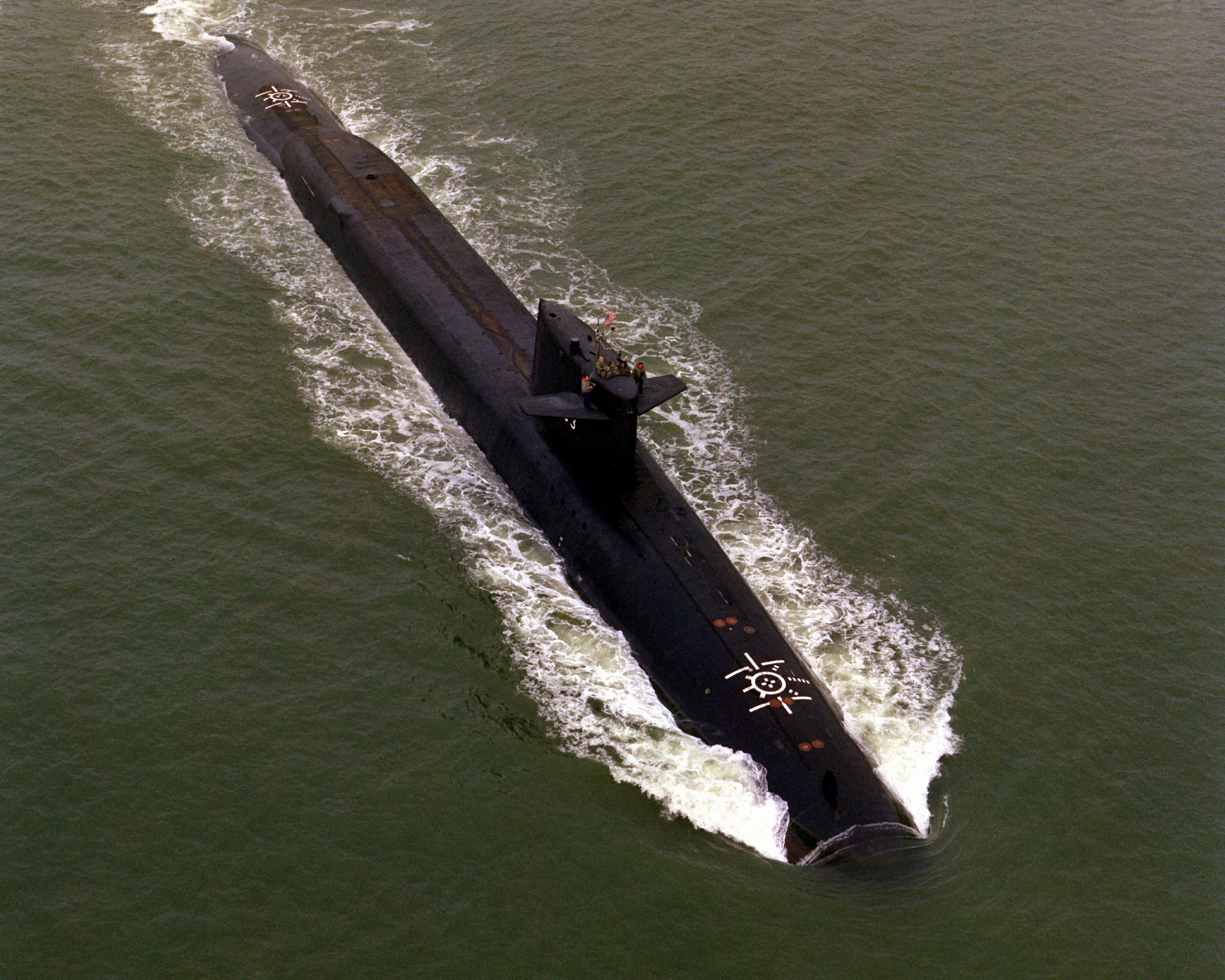
- USS Casimir Pulaski (SSBN-633) on 10 January 1983

History

United States
- Namesake: Casimir Pulaski (1745–1779), a Polish general who served in the American Revolutionary War
- Ordered: 20 July 1961
- Builder: Electric Boat, Groton, Connecticut
- Laid down: 12 January 1963
- Launched: 1 February 1964
- Sponsored by: Mrs. John A. Gronouski Jr.
- Commissioned: 14 August 1964
- Decommissioned: 7 March 1994
- Stricken: 7 March 1994
- Motto: Per Tridentem Libertas; (Freedom through Seapower)
- Fate: Scrapping via Ship-Submarine Recycling Program completed 21 October 1994

General characteristics
- Class & type: James Madison class submarine
- Displacement: 7417 tons surfaced; 8382 tons submerged
- Length: 425 ft (130 m)
- Beam: 33 ft (10 m)
- Draft: 32 ft (9.8 m)
- Installed power: S5W reactor
- Propulsion: 2 × geared steam turbines; 1 × shaft 15,000 shp (11,185 kW)
- Speed: 21 knots (39 km/h; 24 mph) submerged, 16 knots (30 km/h; 18 mph) surfaced
- Test depth: 1,300 feet (400 m)
- Complement: Two crews (Blue and Gold) of 13 officers and 130 enlisted men each
- Armament: 16 × ballistic missile tubes; 4 × 21 in (533 mm) torpedo tubes

USS Casimir Pulaski (SSBN-633), a James Madison-class ballistic missile submarine, was the second ship of the United States Navy to be named for Casimir Pulaski (1745–1779), a Polish general who served in the American Revolutionary War.

== Construction and commissioning ==
The contract to build Casimir Pulaski was awarded to the Electric Boat Division (EB) of the General Dynamics Corporation in Groton, Connecticut, on 20 July 1961, and her keel was laid down there on 12 January 1963. She was launched on 1 February 1964, sponsored by Mary Louise (Metz) Gronouski, wife of United States Postmaster General and first Polish-American cabinet officer John A. Gronouski Jr., and commissioned on 14 August 1964, with Captain Robert L. J. Long in command of the Blue Crew and Commander Thomas B. Brittain Jr. in command of the Gold Crew.

== Service history ==
Casimir Pulaski's first dive was on 28 June 1964. After she was commissioned on 14 August 1964, Casimir Pulaski stood out of Electric Boat for a three-month shakedown cruise with both crews to the waters off Cape Kennedy where she test-fired multiple UGM-27 Polaris ballistic missiles. Blue Crew's first missile firing was on 31 October and Gold Crew's was on 13 November 1964. She completed her shakedown on 5 December 1964 and proceeded back to Groton.

From Groton, the boat went to the Polaris Missile Facility Atlantic at Naval Weapons Station Charleston, South Carolina, for her final weapons loadout. Assigned to Submarine Squadron (Subron) 16, she proceeded to Naval Station Rota, Spain, in March 1965. The Pulaski's Blue Crew set sail on the boat's first deterrent patrol on 13 April 1965.

After completing 20 deterrent patrols, Casimir Pulaski returned to EB in Groton, Connecticut on 5 January 1970 for refueling and overhaul where the S5W reactor was replaced with an S3G core 3 and the boat became the seventh SSBN refitted to carry UGM-73 Poseidon ballistic missiles. After the overhaul, she was reassigned to Submarine Squadron (SubRon) 14 and departed for Holy Loch, Scotland on 30 April 1971.

In June 1971, while in Holy Loch, Casimir Pulaski was the first boat to have the Integrated Data Acquisition System (IDAS) M-35 set installed. On 2 July, the Blue Crew successfully completed the Pulaski's first Poseidon missile launch during her Demonstration and Shakedown Operations (DASO) — testing of missile systems that allowed the collection of flight data and examinations of submarine launch platforms. The Gold Crew followed up with a launch on 16 August. With DASO complete, Pulaski returned to the fleet, beginning her next operational patrol on 28 October 1971.

During her sixth operational test, Pulaski's Gold Crew launched four Poseidon missiles on 2 March 1973.

In July 1974, SubRon 14 bestowed Pulaski with the Battle Efficiency (Battle "E") Award, the first ever for any ballistic missile boat. Later that year, she completed her 50th strategic deterrent patrol.

Late in 1980, Pulaski entered Newport News Shipyard for refueling and overhaul, where she was modified for the UGM-96 Trident I ballistic missile. Reassigned to Submarine Squadron (Subron) 16, following overhaul and refueling, she proceeded to her new homeport at Naval Submarine Base, Kings Bay, GA, arriving on 10 December 1982. During the post-overhaul DASO, on 19 April 1983, the Gold Crew successfully launched a Trident I ballistic missile, and a Trident missile flight was terminated on a malfunction after launch. Returning to fleet operations, SSBN-633 began her next deterrent patrol on 3 June.

On 17 June 1985, Casimir Pulaski successfully test fired four Trident I missiles in the Atlantic Test Range Range off Cape Canaveral, Florida.

In October 1985, Casimir Pulaski Gold Crew won the Arleigh Burke Fleet Trophy for most improvement in combat efficiency of any Navy unit in the US Atlantic Fleet during Fiscal Year 1985, under the Command of Commander Conrad A. Plyler, Jr, USN. The ship went on to win the fiscal year 1986 Battle Efficiency "E" for Submarine Squadron Sixteen and the Fleet Ballistic Submarine Superior Performance Award Trophy (Providence Plantation Trophy) for the US Atlantic Fleet under the command of Commander Plyler (Gold Crew) and Commander William W. Schmidt (Blue Crew). The ship also received the Navy Unit Meritorious Commendation ribbon for her service from 1 January 1985 to 2 October 1986. During this period, the ship participated in a successful Atlantic Fleet Follow-on Operational Test on the Atlantic Test Range, evaluating the readiness of the Trident C-4 missile.

From 1 April to 20 May 1989, Casimir Pulaski participated in Concept of Operation Exercise LANTCOOPEX 1-89, held at a remote site—Port Canaveral—away from an SSBN refit port, arriving there after the end of Gold Crew deterrent patrol. After being relieved by the Blue Crew, both crews—with tender personnel—conducted a complete resupply of the ship and performed major maintenance and repairs, and a torpedo reload with no submarine tender present, just a refit barge, under conditions of round-the-clock special forces simulated attacks. After LANTCOOPEX 1-89, both crews received a Letter of Commendation from Secretary of the Navy Henry L. Garrett III. In the fall of 1989, SubRon 16 awarded Pulaski with the Battle Efficiency (Battle "E") Award. In November, the Blue Crew sailors were awarded the Humanitarian Service Medal for their actions in response to Hurricane Hugo, which caused widespread damage in the Caribbean and the southeast United States.

In May 1993, Pulaski completed her 88th and final deterrent patrol. The two crews were combined and SSBN-633 was transferred to the Pacific Fleet for inactivation and decommissioning.

USS Casimir Pulaski's 88 Strategic Deterrent Patrols were the most of any of the original "41 For Freedom" missile submarine fleet.

== Decommissioning and disposal ==
After her final cruise under Commander Kenneth W. Wrona, Casimir Pulaski was decommissioned on 7 March 1994 and simultaneously stricken from the Naval Vessel Register. Her scrapping via the Nuclear-Powered Ship and Submarine Recycling Program at Bremerton, Washington was completed on 21 October 1994.
