= HMS Vengeance (S31) =

1999 Vanguard-class nuclear-powered ballistic missile submarine of the Royal Navy

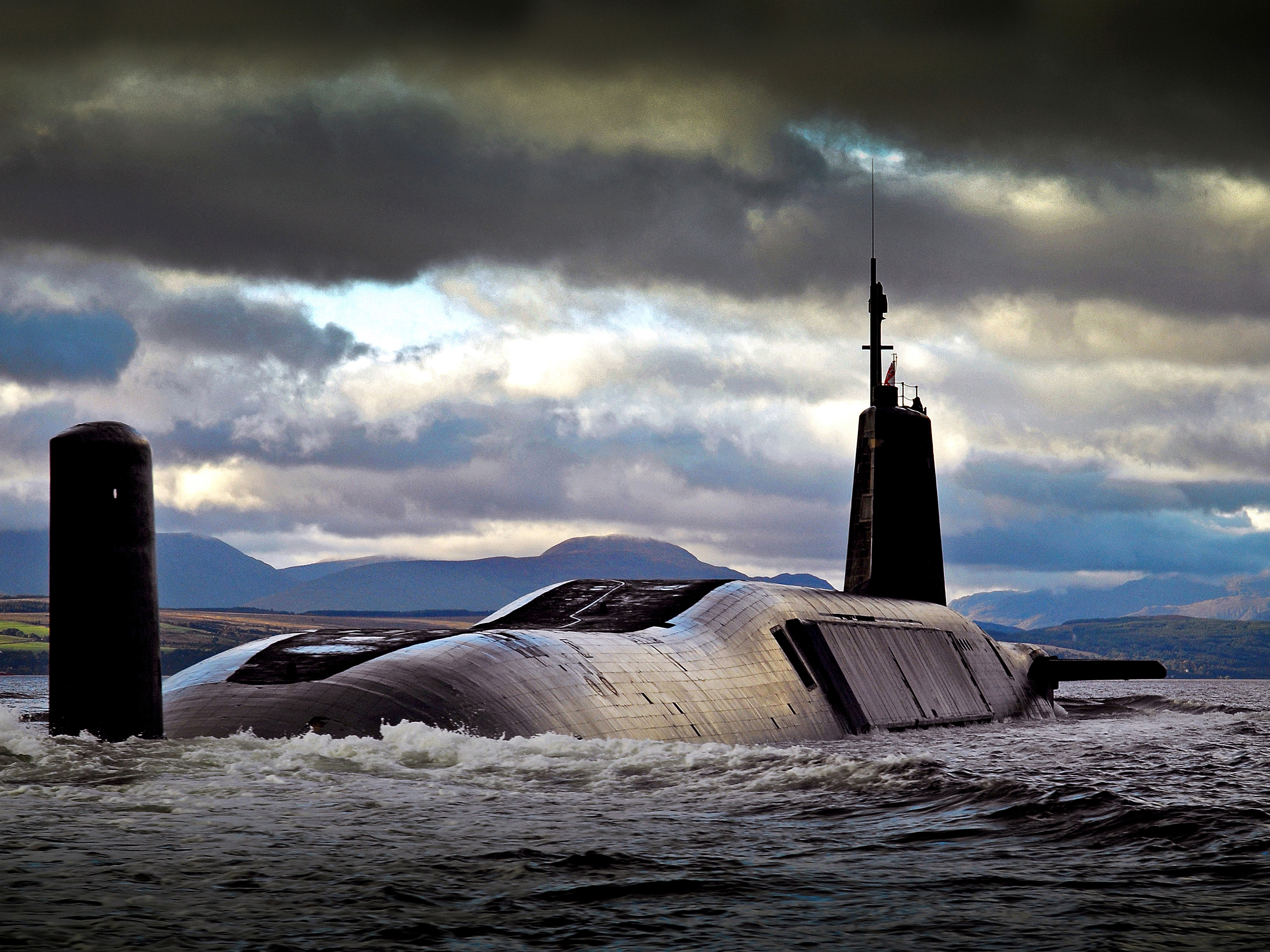
- HMS Vengeance returning to HMNB Clyde in 2007

History

United Kingdom
- Name: HMS Vengeance
- Laid down: 1 February 1993
- Launched: 19 September 1998
- Commissioned: 27 November 1999
- In service: 12 February 2001
- Home port: HMNB Clyde
- Motto: Safe by my strength
- Badge

General characteristics
- Class & type: Vanguard-class submarine
- Displacement: 15,900 tonnes, submerged
- Length: 149.9 m (491 ft 10 in)
- Beam: 12.8 m (42 ft 0 in)
- Draught: 12 m (39 ft 4 in)
- Propulsion: 1 × Rolls-Royce PWR2 nuclear reactor, 2 × GEC turbines; 27,500 shp (20.5 MW); 1 × shaft, pump jet propulsor; 2 × auxiliary retractable propulsion motors; 2 × Allen turbo generators (6 MW); 2 × Paxman diesel alternators; 2,700 shp (2.0 MW)
- Speed: In excess of 25 knots (46 km/h; 29 mph), submerged
- Range: Only limited by food and maintenance requirements.
- Complement: 135
- Sensors & processing systems: BAE Systems SMCS; Kelvin Hughes Type 1007 I-band navigation radar; Thales Underwater Systems Type 2054 composite sonar suite comprising: Marconi/Ferranti Type 2046 towed array sonar; Type 2043 hull-mounted active and passive search sonar; Type 2082 passive intercept and ranging sonar; Pilkington Optronics CK51 search periscope; Pilkington Optronics CH91 attack periscope
- Electronic warfare & decoys: Two SSE Mk10 launchers for Type 2066 and Type 2071 torpedo decoys; RESM Racal UAP passive intercept
- Armament: 4 × 21-inch (533 mm) torpedo tubes for: Spearfish heavyweight torpedoes; 16 × ballistic missile tubes for: Lockheed Trident II D5 SLBMs with up to 12 MIRVed Holbrook Mk-4A (100 kt_{TNT}) nuclear warheads each

HMS Vengeance is the fourth and final Vanguard-class submarine of the Royal Navy. Vengeance carries the Trident ballistic missile, the UK's nuclear deterrent.

Vengeance was built at Barrow-in-Furness by Vickers Shipbuilding and Engineering Ltd, later BAE Systems Submarine Solutions, was launched in September 1998, and commissioned in November 1999.

Before she was commissioned, the British Government stated that once the Vanguard submarines became fully operational, they would only carry 200 warheads.

Vengeance carries unopened "last instructions" (letters of last resort) of the current British prime minister that are to be used in the event of a national catastrophe or a nuclear strike; this letter is identical to the letters carried on board the other three submarines of the Vanguard class.

== Operational history ==
On 31 March 2011, while on a training exercise, Vengeance suffered a blockage in her propulsor causing a reduction in propulsion. The boat returned to Faslane naval base on the surface under her own power. According to the MOD the problems were not nuclear related.

In 2012, Vengeance started a 40-month refit at HMNB Devonport near Plymouth which refueled her reactor and renewed her machinery and electronics. During that period her sister ship Vigilant took her place in the patrol rotations. She sailed from Devonport on 4 December 2015, her place in refit being taken by Vanguard. Vengeance then went through trials from January 2016 to June 2016 and fired an unarmed D5 missile during her Demonstration and Shakedown Operation (DASO) which allowed her to return to the fleet. Whilst the firing of the missile was a success, the missile itself suffered a failure during flight and the test was terminated.

In March 2024, Vengeance completed a 201-day submerged deployment, the second-longest submarine deployment in the Royal Navy's history. In November 2026, Vengeance completed a 217-day submerged deployment, a new Royal Navy record.

== Affiliations ==
- The Royal Scots Dragoon Guards (Carabiniers and Greys)
- Worshipful Company of Salters
- Bury St Edmunds

== See also ==
- List of submarines of the Royal Navy
- List of submarine classes of the Royal Navy
- Nuclear weapons and the United Kingdom
- Royal Navy Submarine Service
- Submarine-launched ballistic missile
- Trident nuclear programme
