= UGM-133 Trident II =

US/UK SLBM

UGM-133A Trident II
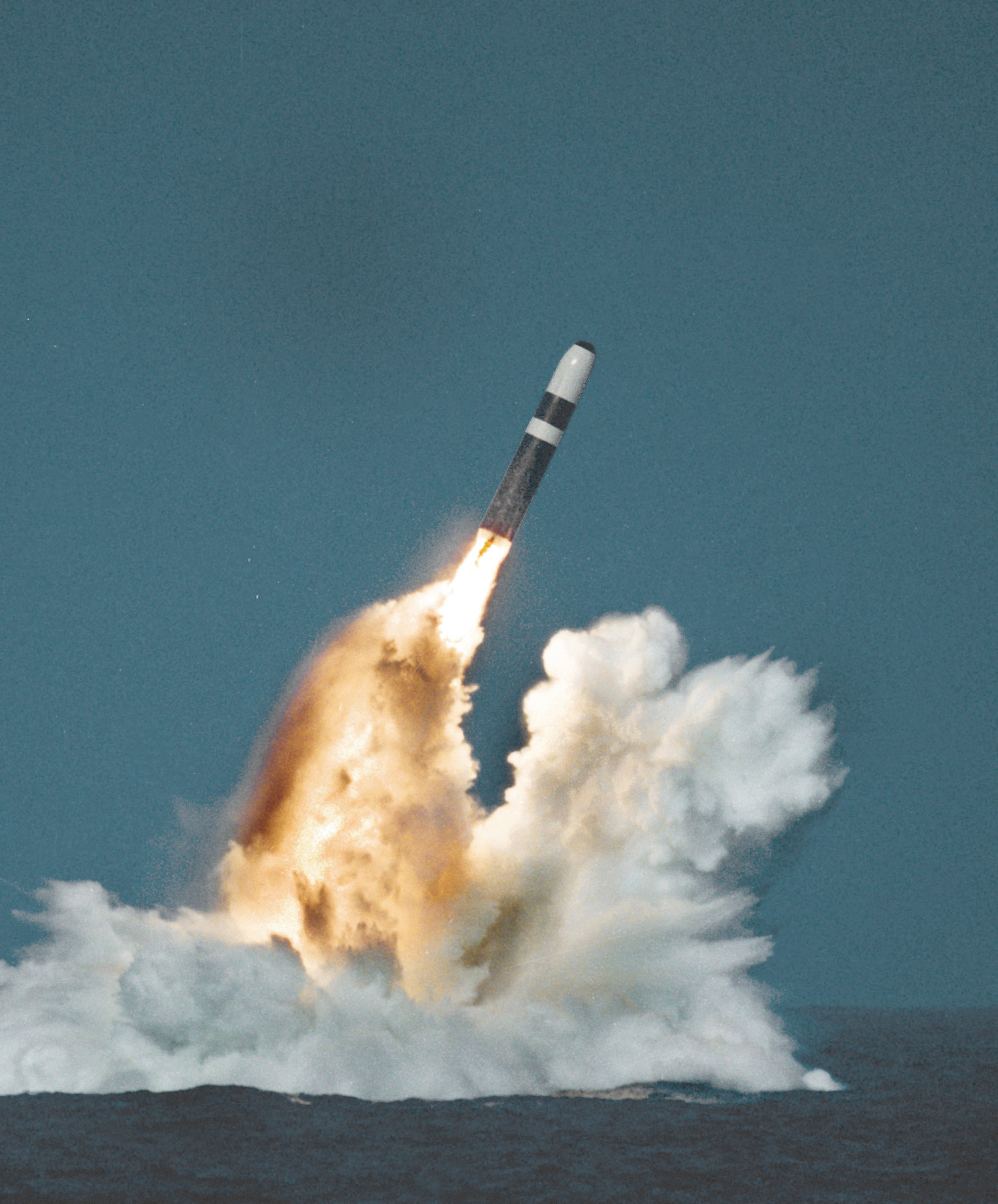
- Type: SLBM
- Place of origin: United States

Service history
- In service: 1990–present
- Used by: United States Navy; Royal Navy

Production history
- Manufacturer: Lockheed Martin Space
- Unit cost: $30.9 million (1987 USD) ($87.6 million in 2025 dollars)
- Produced: 1983

Specifications
- Mass: 130,000 lb (59,000 kg)
- Length: 44 ft 6.6 in (13.579 m)
- Diameter: 6 ft 11 in (2.11 m) (1st stage)
- Warhead: United States; 1–8 Mk-5 RV/W88 (475 kt) or 1–12 Mk-4 RV/W76-0 (100 kt) or 1–12 Mk-4A RV/W-76-1 (90 kt) or Mk-7 RV/W93 (planned); Single or multiple W76-2 (5–7 kt); United Kingdom; Mk-4A RV/Holbrook (100 kt); Mk-7 RV/A21 Astraea (planned)
- Engine: Three solid-fuel rocket motors; first & second stage – Thiokol/Hercules solid-fueled rocket; third stage – United Technologies Corp. solid-fueled rocket
- Propellant: NEPE-75: Nitrate ester, plasticized polyethylene glycol-bound HMX, aluminum, ammonium perchlorate
- Operational range: Full load (8x Mk5/W88): 4,100 nmi (4,700 mi; 7,600 km); Reduced load (4x Mk5/W88): 6,220 nmi (7,160 mi; 11,520 km)
- Maximum speed: Approximately 18,030 mph (29,020 km/h) (Mach 24; 8,060 m/s) (terminal phase)
- Guidance system: MK 6 astro-inertial guidance
- Steering system: Single movable nozzle actuated by a gas generator
- Accuracy: 100 m
- Launch platform: Ballistic missile submarine

The UGM-133A Trident II, or Trident D5 is a submarine-launched ballistic missile (SLBM), built by Lockheed Martin Space in Sunnyvale, California, and deployed with the United States Navy and Royal Navy. It was first deployed in March 1990, and remains in service. With greater accuracy, payload, and range than the earlier Trident C-4, it is a key element of US and UK strategic deterrence, and complements the US strategic nuclear triad of land-based LGM-30 Minuteman intercontinental ballistic missiles and air-based bombs and AGM-86B missiles. The Trident II is considered to be a durable sea-based system capable of engaging many targets. It has payload flexibility that can accommodate various treaty requirements, such as New START. The Trident II's increased payload allows nuclear deterrence to be accomplished with fewer submarines, and its high accuracy—approaching that of land-based missiles—enables it to be used as a first strike weapon.

Trident II missiles are carried by 14 US Ohio and 4 British Vanguard-class submarines, with 20 missiles on each Ohio class and 16 missiles on each Vanguard class (the number of missiles on Ohio-class submarines was reduced from 24 to 20 by 2017, in compliance with the New Strategic Arms Reduction Treaty). There have been 215 total test launches of the D5, with 207 successes. 196 launches were from the sea: 191 successes and 5 failures. 181 of the successes and 3 of the failures were by the US, while 10 of the successes and 2 of the failures were by the UK. 19 launches were from land, all by the US, with 16 successes and 3 failures. The most recent successful launch from USS Louisiana (SSBN-743) on 27 September 2023. There have been 8 test flights that were failures, the most recent being from HMS Vanguard off the coast of Florida in January 2024. The D5 is the sixth in a series of missile generations deployed since the sea-based deterrent program began 60 years ago. The Trident D5LE (life-extension) version will remain in service until 2042.

== History ==
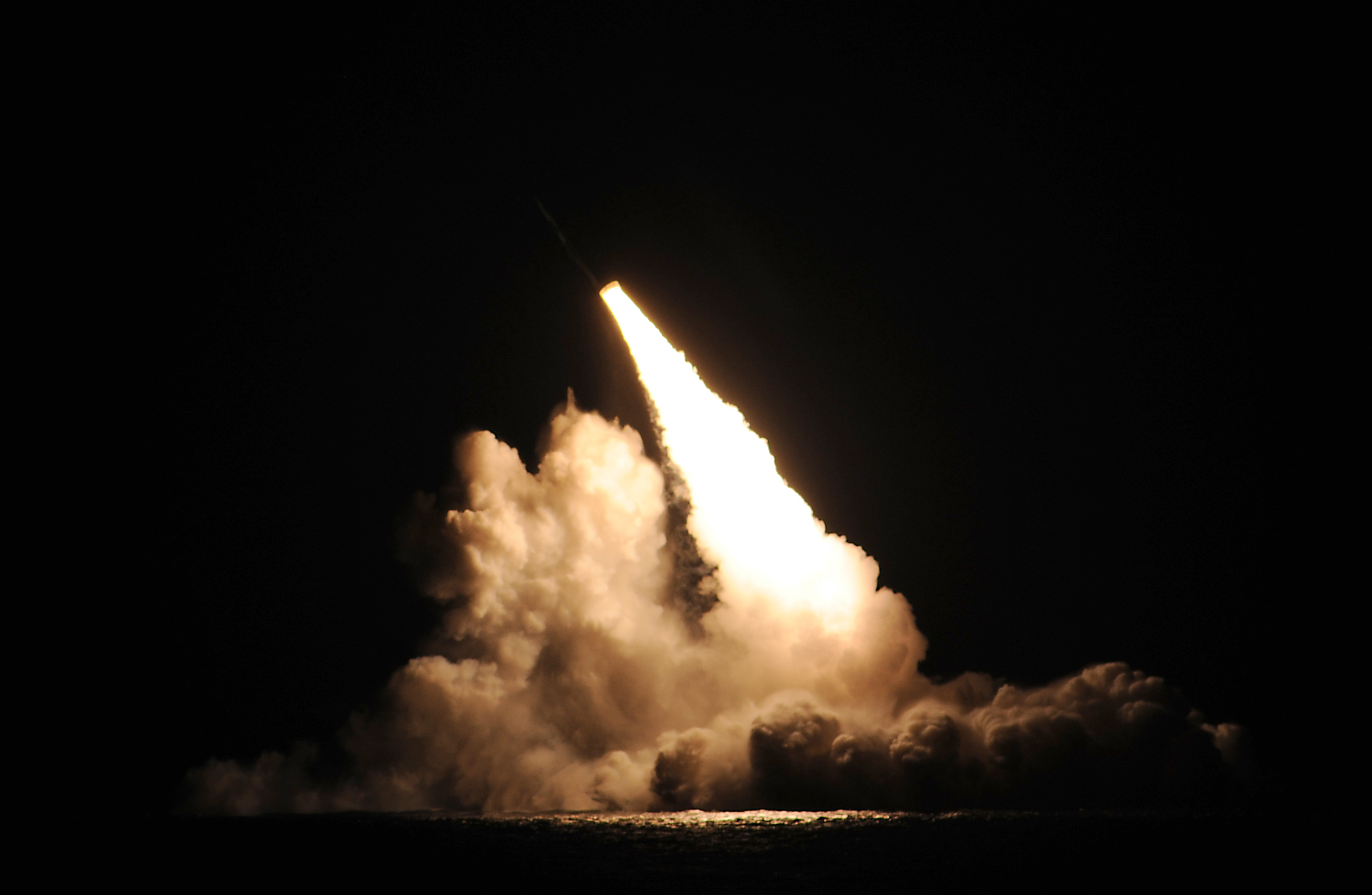
USS Kentucky firing a Trident II SLBM in 2015 as part of the DASO 26 test launch

The Trident II was designed with greater range and payload capacity than its predecessor (Trident C-4). In 1972, the US Navy projected an initial operating capability (IOC) date of 1984. The US Navy shifted the IOC date to 1982. On 18 October 1973, a Trident program review was administered. On 14 March 1974, the US Deputy Secretary of Defense disseminated two requirements for the Trident program. The first was an accuracy improvement for the Trident C-4. The second requirement asked for an alternative to the C-4, or a new Trident II missile with a larger first-stage motor than the C-4.

The U.S. Navy conducted studies to determine whether the more expensive Trident II could be constructed similarly to the US Air Force's MX ICBM, primarily to decrease budget costs. It was established that the Trident II would be 83 inches (210 cm) in diameter and 44 feet (13 m) in length in order to match the performance of the existing MX ICBM. Modifications to the guidance system, electronics hardening, and external protective coatings were incorporated into the design. While this satisfied the Navy's study requirements, it did not accommodate the US Air Force payload requirements.

Propulsion stages were proposed to be used between the first stage and second stage motors, effectively making the Trident II a longer three-stage missile than the C-4. Studies were delayed in 1978 when Congress approved only $5 million of the suggested $15 million for the Navy and Air Force program studies. By December 1978, the Navy's and the Air Force's own studies agreed with each other that a similar missile structure would not achieve desired savings. It was determined that the Navy and Air Force would maintain and be responsible for their own unique weapon systems. The US Navy continued with its own design of the Trident II.

In March 1980, US Secretary of Defense Harold Brown proposed an increased level of funding for the submarine-launched ballistic missile modernization, emphasizing increased accuracy. The House Armed Services Committee (HASC) recommended no funding, while the Senate Armed Services Committee (SASC) recommended full funding of $97 million. The SASC asked for a plan incorporating "the fullest possible competition . . . [and] should consider competing among contractors for each major component, including the integrated missile." $65 million was awarded for the submarine-launched ballistic missile modernization.

On 2 October 1981, President Reagan called for the modernization of the strategic forces. The Defense Department directed the Navy to fund all development of the Trident II D5 missile with a December 1989 IOC. All research and development efforts would be directed toward "a new development, advanced technology, high accuracy Trident II D5 system." In December 1982, Deputy SECDEF Frank Carlucci advised the Secretary of Defense Caspar Weinberger to include funding for a new reentry vehicle–warhead combination for Trident II. The reentry vehicle was to be designated as the Mk 5, which was to have a greater yield than the Mk 4. The development contract for Trident II was issued in October 1983. On 28 December 1983, the deputy SECDEF authorized the Navy to proceed with full-scale engineering development of the Trident II D5.

An initial series of 19 land-based Trident II launches took place from Cape Canaveral Launch Complex 46 from 15 January 1987 to 27 January 1989. The first submarine launch was attempted by USS Tennessee, the first D-5 ship of the Ohio class, on 21 March 1989 off the coast of Cape Canaveral, Florida. The launch attempt failed four seconds into the flight because the plume of water following the missile rose to a greater height than expected, and water was in the nozzle when the motor ignited. Once the problem was understood, relatively simple changes were quickly made, but the problem delayed the initial operating capability of Trident II until March 1990. IOC for Strategic Weapons Facility Pacific (SWFPAC) was completed on schedule in 2001, allowing Trident II SSBN to be deployed in the Pacific theater.

In 1980, the United Kingdom adopted the Trident I C-4 missile as the central part of its nuclear deterrent, but never took delivery. In 1982, the US and the UK again modified the Polaris Sales Agreement replacing the Trident I C4 with the Trident II D4 missile, with the UK taking delivery of its first missile in 1994.

== Design ==
The Trident II is a three-stage rocket, each stage containing a solid-fuel rocket motor. The first motor is made by Northrop Grumman. This first stage incorporates a solid propellant motor, parts to ensure first-stage ignition, and a thrust vector control (TVC) system. The first-stage section, compared to the Trident C-4, is slightly larger, allowing increased range and a larger payload. In addition to a larger motor, the D-5 uses an advanced and lighter fuel binder (polyethylene glycol) than the C-4. This fuel is more commonly known as NEPE-75. (NEPE stands for nitrate ester plasticized polyether, the 75 represents that the fuel contains 75% solids.) The solid components bound by fuel binder are HMX, aluminum, and ammonium perchlorate.

Both the first- and second-stage motors are connected by an interstage casing, which contains electronic equipment and ordnance for separation during flight. The second stage also contains a motor made by Thiokol and Hercules Inc., parts to ensure the second-stage ignition, and a TVC system. The first and second stages are both important to the structural integrity of the missile. To ensure that the stages maintain a maximal strength-to-weight ratio, both stages are reinforced by a carbon-fiber-reinforced polymer hull.

The second and third-stage sections are connected by an integrated equipment/adapter section (ES). The equipment/adapter section is modified to be shorter and more compact than the C-4's adapter section. The D-5's equipment section contains critical guidance and flight control avionics, such as the Mk 6 navigation system. The equipment section also contains the third-stage TVC system, ordnance for ejecting from the second-stage motor, and the MIRV platform. The nose fairing shields the payload and third-stage motor. Mounted within the nose cap (above the nose fairing) is an extendable aerospike. This aerospike effectively decreases drag by 50%. The third-stage hull is also reinforced by carbon fiber and kevlar.

The Trident II is the first missile of the US Navy's Fleet Ballistic Missile program to incorporate a 3D printed component.

While Lockheed Martin is the prime contractor, a variety of corporations work on the Trident II. For example, in October 2020, Boeing was contracted for maintenance, rebuilding and technical services for the Trident II navigation subsystem, and Northrop Grumman was contracted for engineering support and integration for the Trident II and relevant submarines at sites and shipyards from Sunnyvale, California, and Bangor, Washington, to Kings Bay, Georgia, and Cape Canaveral, Florida, among other locales. Peraton was contracted for program support services on the Trident II reentry subsystem, and Systems Planning & Analysis Inc. was contracted for Trident II technical services, program support, assessments, special studies, and systems engineering.

=== Sequence of operation ===
US Navy test-firing Trident II D-5 UGM-133A missile, September 2021 (DASO 31 SSBN 742) during a Demonstration and Shakedown Operation.

Before the launch sequence is initiated, the on-board MARK 6 navigation system is activated. The specified mission trajectory is loaded onto the flight computer.

Once the launch command is given, a steam generator system is activated, igniting a gas generator whose exhaust is fed into cooling water, causing expanding gas within the launch tube to force the missile upward, and out of the submarine. Within seconds, the missile breaches the surface of the water and the first-stage Thrust Vectoring Control (TVC) subsystem ignites. This enables hydraulic actuators attached to the first-stage nozzle. Soon after, the first-stage motor ignites and burns for approximately 65 seconds until the fuel is expended; in addition, an aerospike atop the missile deploys shortly after first-stage ignition to shape airflow. When the first-stage motor ceases operation, the second-stage TVC subsystem ignites. The first-stage motor is then ejected by ordnance within the interstage casing.

Once the first stage is cleared, the second-stage motor ignites and burns for approximately 65 seconds. The nose fairing is then jettisoned, separating from the missile. When the nose fairing is clear of the missile, the third-stage TVC subsystem ignites, and ordnance separates the second-stage motor. The third-stage motor then ignites, pushing the equipment section for another approximately 40 seconds. When the third-stage motor reaches the targeted area, the Post Boost Control System (PBCS) ignites, and the third-stage motor is ejected.

The astro-inertial guidance uses star positioning to fine-tune the accuracy of the inertial guidance system after launch. As the accuracy of a missile is dependent upon the guidance system knowing the exact position of the missile at any given moment during its flight, the fact that stars are a fixed reference point from which to calculate that position makes this a potentially very effective means of improving accuracy. In the Trident system, this was achieved by a single camera that was designed to spot just one star in its expected position. If it was not quite aligned to where it should be, it would indicate that the inertial system was not precisely on target and a correction would be made.

The equipment section, with the MIRV, then aims the reentry vehicles (RV) towards the earth. The payload is then released from the MIRV platform. To prevent the PBCS correctional thrust from interfering with the RV when released, the equipment section initiates the Plume Avoidance Maneuver (PAM). If the RV will be disrupted by the PBCS nozzle's thrust, the nearest nozzle will shut off until the RV is away from the MIRV. The PAM is used only when a nozzle's plume will disrupt the area near an RV. The PAM is a specialized design feature added to the Trident II to increase accuracy.

=== Warheads ===
In US service Trident II can be loaded with up to eight Mk-5 RVs with 475-kt W88 warheads, up to twelve Mk-4A RVs with 90-kt W76-1 warheads, and up to twelve Mk-4A RVs with 5–7-kt W76-2 warheads. In practice, each missile on average carries four warheads due to the warhead limitations placed by the New START treaty.

The system previously carried the Mk-4 RV with a 100 kt W76-0 warhead, but beginning in September 2008 W76-0s were converted to W76-1s. This process was completed by December 2018. Conversion from the W76-0 to W76-1 involved fitting the warheads with a new RV (the Mk-4A), replacing age limited components and fitting the warhead with a new MC4700 arming, fusing and firing (AF&F) system. The MC4700 AF&F system (dubbed the "super fuze") significantly improves warhead kill probabilities against hardened targets such as silos or bunkers. The W76-2 is also fitted with the Mk-4A RV and MC4700 fuze.

In the National Nuclear Security Administration's 2021 budget request, the agency requested US$53m to begin development of a new W93 warhead for use on Trident II and US$32 million to begin development of a new Mk-7 RV. If approved, the W93 will be the first new nuclear weapon system to receive a type designation since the end of the Cold War. It is unclear if the W93 will replace the W76-1, the W88 or both warheads.

In UK usage Trident II missiles are equipped with a warhead called Holbrook and have a maximum yield of 100 kt. The UK government claims the warhead is a British design, but analysts believe that it is largely based on the US W76 design. In 2011 it was reported that British warheads would receive the new Mk 4A reentry vehicles and some or all of the other upgrades that US W76 warheads were receiving in their W76-1 Life Extension Program. Some reports suggested that British warheads would receive the same arming, fusing and firing system (AF&F) as the US W76-1. Under a 1958 agreement, the US supplies the UK with blueprints of its own warhead designs but the design, manufacture and maintenance of UK warheads are purely a UK responsibility. The British government's Atomic Weapons Establishment is currently developing a new warhead, named Astraea and designated A21/Mk7, to replace the existing Holbrook warhead. It will be the first British warhead to be developed without live tests and development will involve EPURE, a joint UK-French hydrodynamics facility in Valduc, France.

== Additional specifications ==
- Range (exact is classified):
  - Full load (8x Mk5/W88): 4,100 nmi (4,700 mi; 7,600 km)
  - Reduced load (4x Mk5/W88): 6,220 nmi (7,160 mi; 11,520 km)
- Guidance system: The MK 6 Astro-inertial guidance navigation system. Inertial guidance is most favored for the initial guidance and reentry vehicles of strategic missiles, because it has no external signal and cannot be jammed.
- CEP: Requirement: <90 metres (300 ft). (Information from flight tests is classified.)

Mk-5 RV (175 kg each) offloading effects on D-5 range
Mk-5 RVs	Throw-weight (kg)	D-5 range (km)	Increase in range (%)
8	2,700	7,593	nominal
7	2,525	8,278	9
6	2,350	9,111	20
5	2,175	10,148	34
4	2,000	11,519	52
3	1,825	13,482	78

== Operators ==
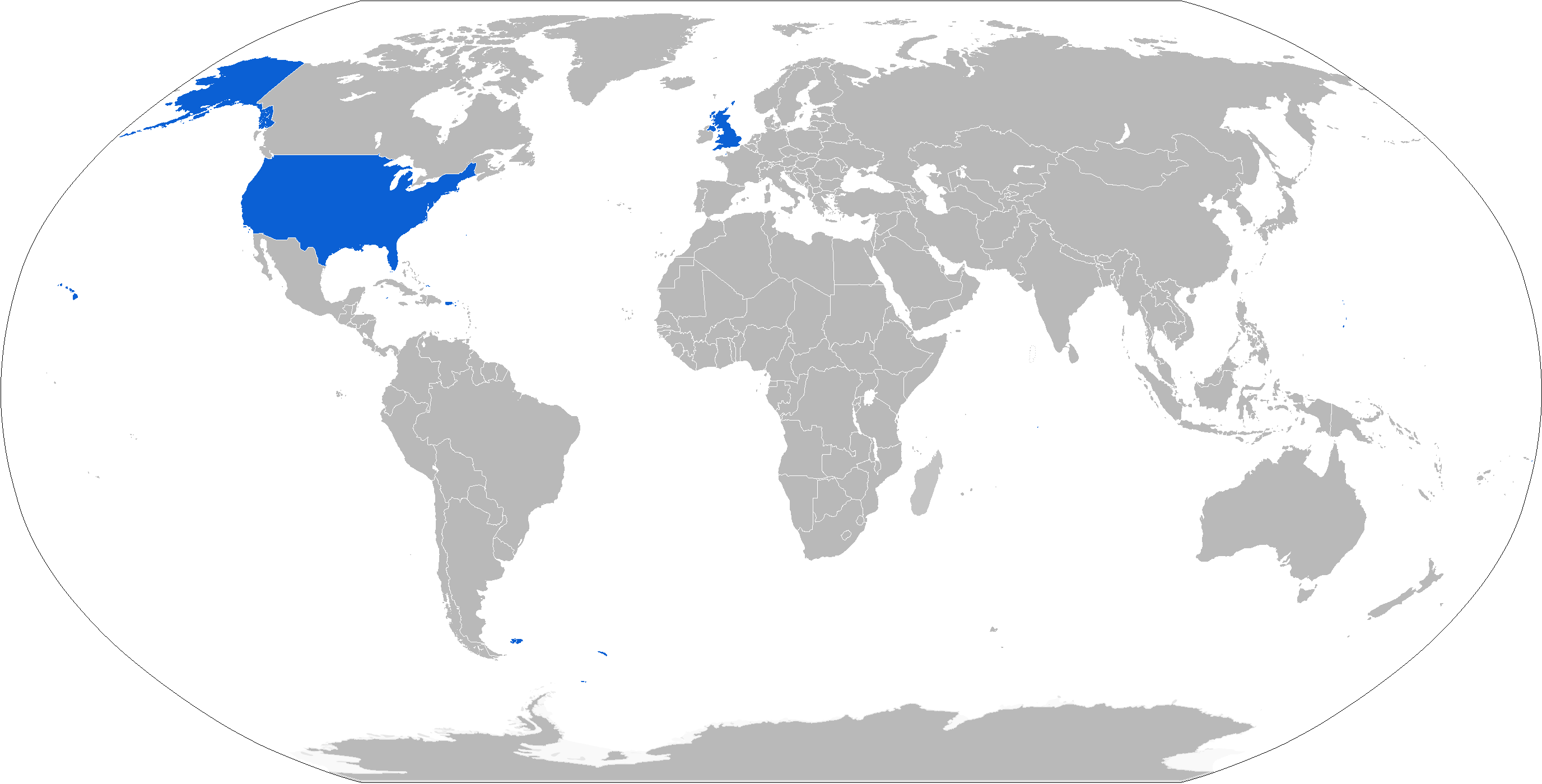
Map with UGM-133 operators in blue

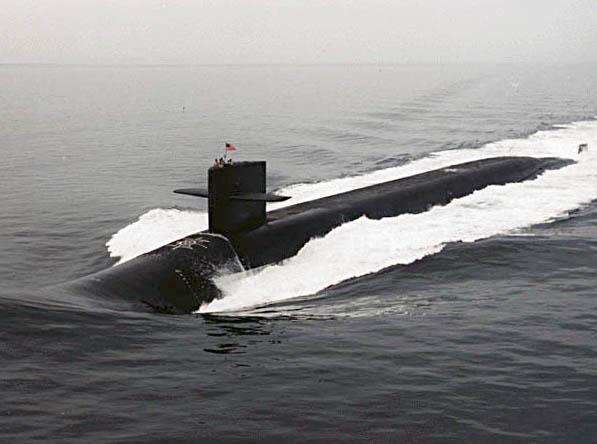
USS Kentucky, an Ohio-class submarine of the US Navy

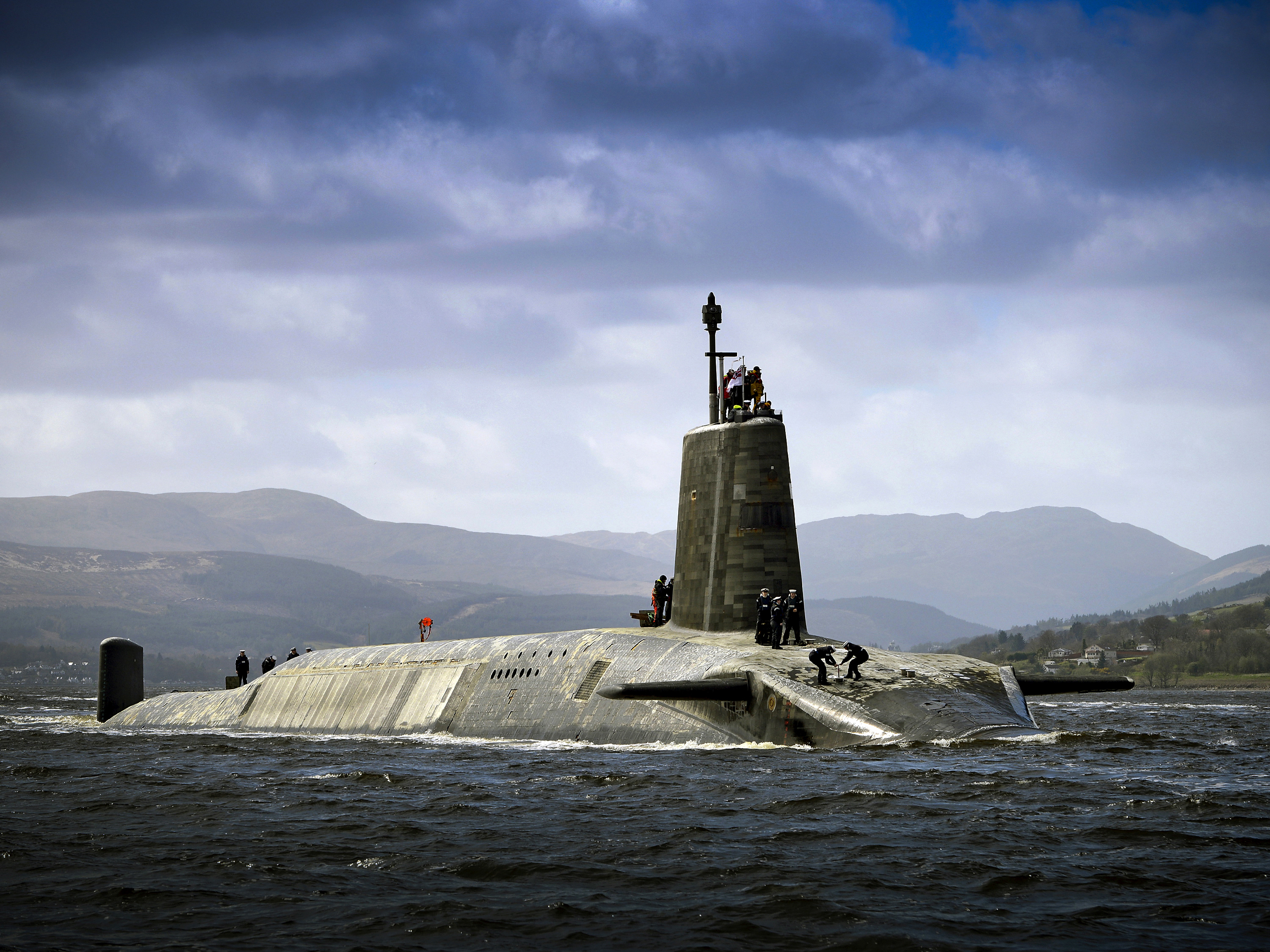
HMS Vigilant, a Vanguard-class submarine of the Royal Navy

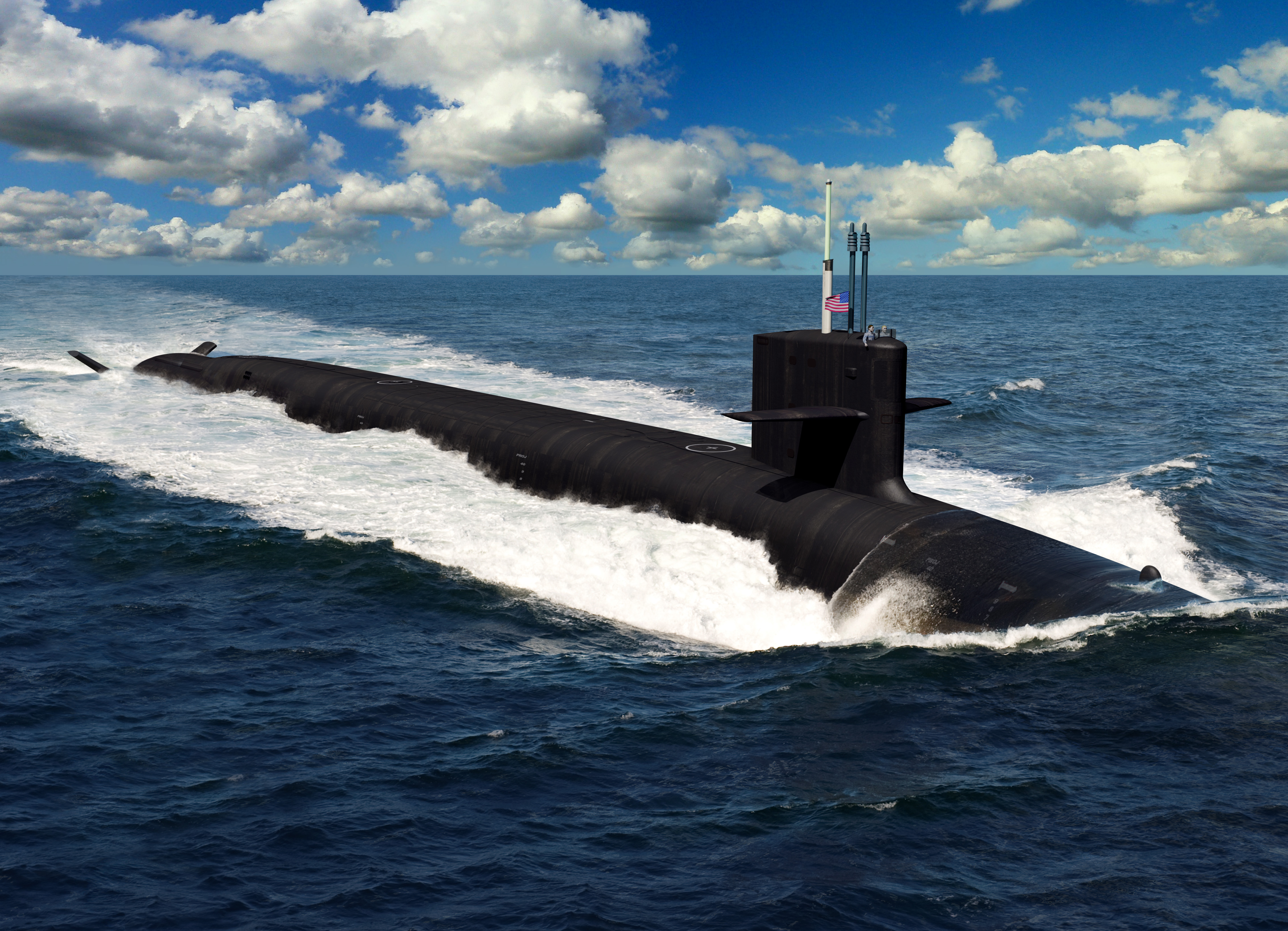
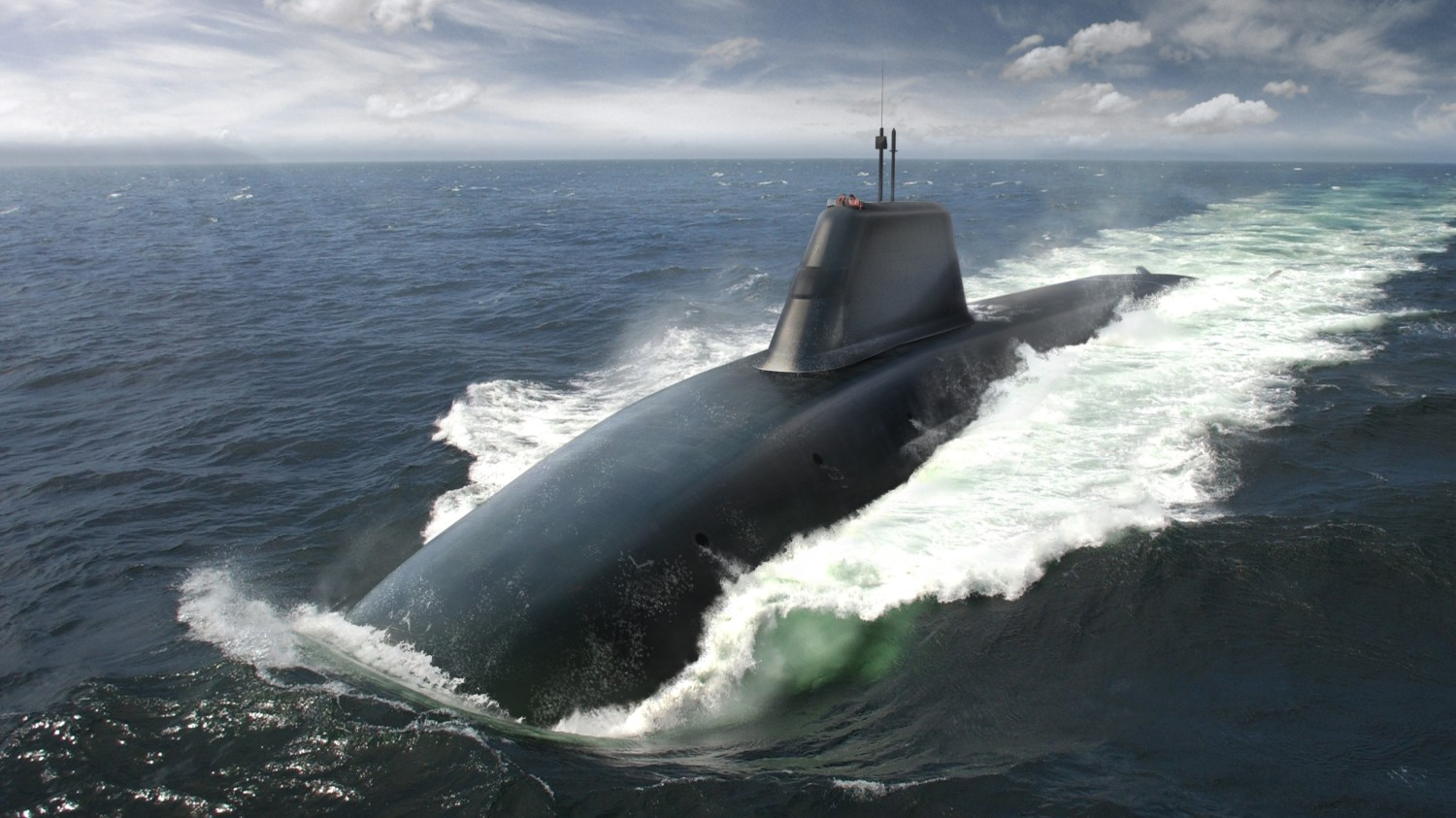
Artists' impressions of Columbia-class (left) and Dreadnought-class (right)

The Royal Navy operates its missiles from a shared pool, together with the Atlantic squadron of the U.S. Navy Ohio-class SSBNs at King's Bay, Georgia. The pool is co-mingled and missiles are selected at random for loading on to either nation's submarines.

=== Trident II missile submarines ===
United States Navy

- Ohio-class submarine
  - Henry M. Jackson
  - Alabama
  - Alaska
  - Nevada
  - Tennessee
  - Pennsylvania
  - West Virginia
  - Kentucky
  - Maryland
  - Nebraska
  - Rhode Island
  - Maine
  - Wyoming
  - Louisiana
- Columbia-class submarine (planned)
  - District of Columbia
  - Wisconsin
  - Groton

Royal Navy

- Vanguard-class submarine
  - Vanguard
  - Victorious
  - Vigilant
  - Vengeance
- Dreadnought-class submarine (planned)
  - Dreadnought
  - Valiant
  - Warspite
  - King George VI

== See also ==
- JL-2 – (China)
- JL-3 – (China)
- Pukguksong-6 – (North Korea)
- M45 (missile) – (France)
- M51 (missile) – (France)
- R-29RMU Sineva – (Russia)
- R-29RMU2 Layner – (Russia)
- R-39 Rif – (Soviet Union)
- RSM-56 Bulava – (Russia)
- K Missile family – (India)
