= USS Patrick Henry =

Submarine of the United States

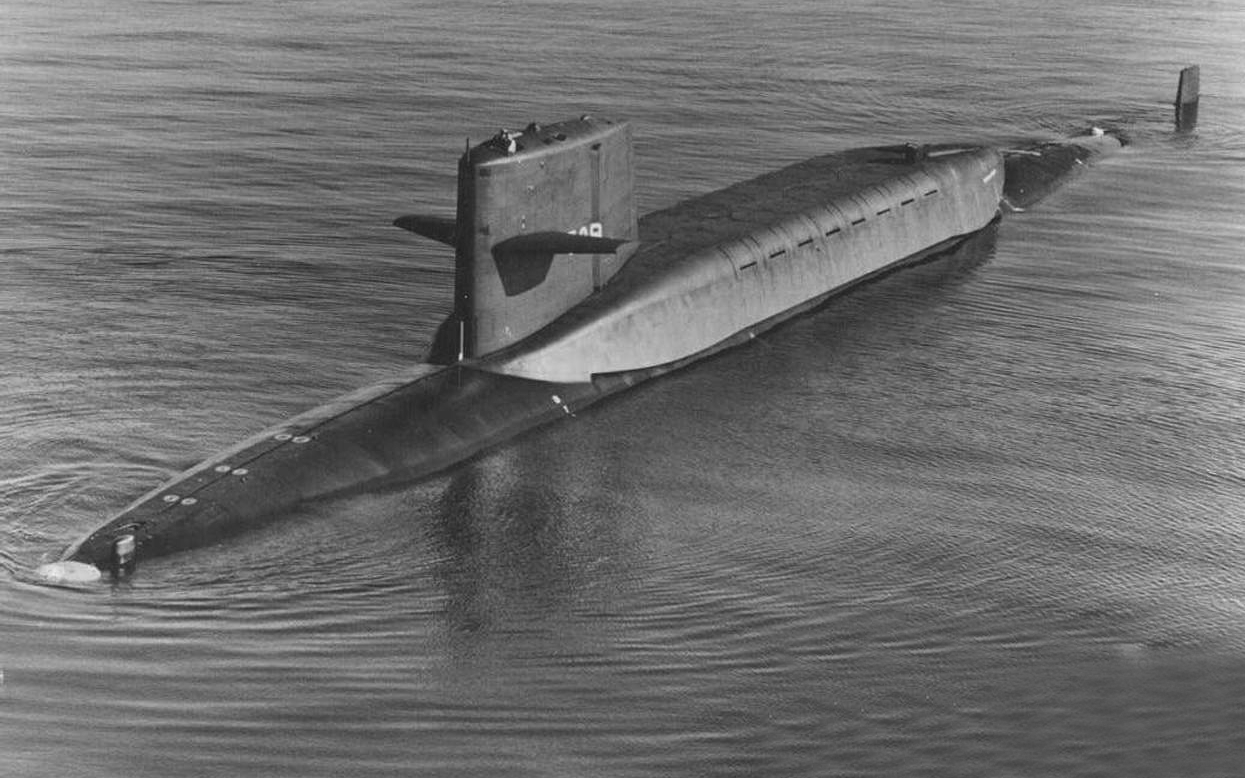
- USS Patrick Henry (SSBN-599)

History

United States
- Name: USS Patrick Henry
- Namesake: Patrick Henry (1736–1799)
- Ordered: 31 December 1957
- Builder: General Dynamics Electric Boat
- Laid down: 27 May 1958
- Launched: 22 September 1959
- Sponsored by: Mrs. Leslie F. Ahrends
- Commissioned: 11 April 1960
- Decommissioned: 25 May 1984
- Stricken: 16 December 1985
- Fate: Recycling via Ship-Submarine Recycling Program completed 21 August 1997

General characteristics
- Class & type: George Washington-class submarine
- Type: SSBN
- Displacement: 5400 tons light; 5959–6019 tons surfaced; 6709–6888 Approx. tons submerged
- Length: 381.6 ft (116.3 m)
- Beam: 33 ft (10 m)
- Draft: 29 ft (8.8 m)
- Propulsion: 1 S5W PWR; 2 geared turbines at 15,000shp; 1 shaft
- Speed: 20 kn (37 km/h) surfaced; +25 kn (46 km/h) submerged
- Range: unlimited except by food supplies
- Test depth: 700 ft (210 m)
- Complement: Two crews (Blue/Gold) each consisting of; 12 officers; 100 men
- Armament: 16 Polaris A1/A3 missiles; 6 × 21 in (530 mm) torpedo tubes

USS Patrick Henry (SSBN-599), named after the American Revolutionary War figure and Founding Father Patrick Henry (1736–1799), was a George Washington class nuclear-powered fleet ballistic missile submarine of the United States Navy. She was later converted into an attack submarine and redesignated SSN-599.

== History ==
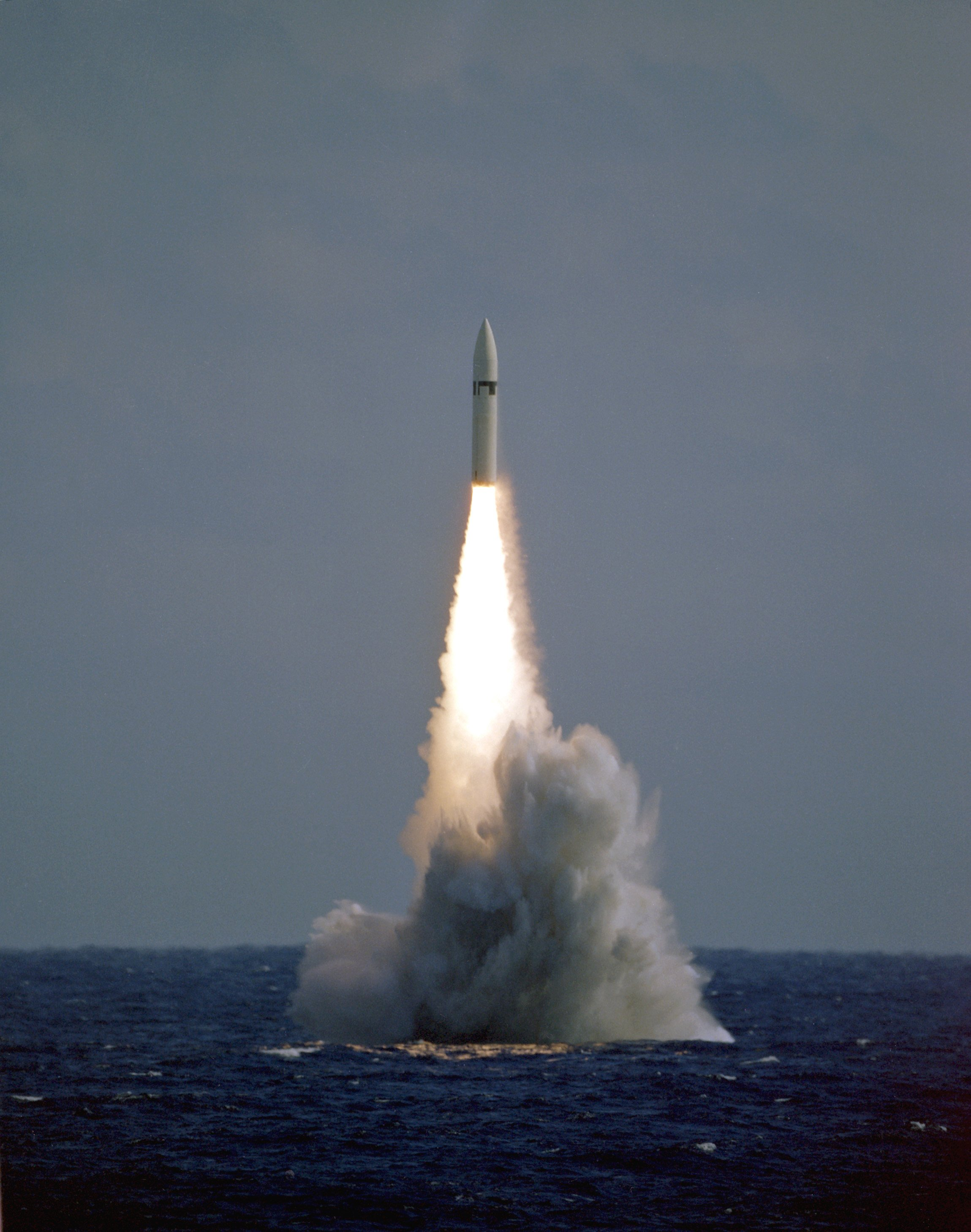
Polaris A3 DASO launch

=== Commissioned ===
Patrick Henry's keel was laid down by the Electric Boat Division of General Dynamics Corporation, in Groton, Connecticut, on 26 May 1958. She was launched on 22 September 1959, sponsored by Mrs. Betty Arends (née Tychon), wife of Congressman Leslie C. Arends and was commissioned on 9 April 1960, with Commander Harold E. Shear in command of the Blue crew and Commander Robert L. J. Long commanding the Gold crew.

Crewed alternately by a Blue and Gold crew, like all US Navy ballistic missile submarines, to maximize her submerged operations, Patrick Henry underwent shakedown with the Blue crew until 16 September 1960, when the Gold crew took over. The second fleet ballistic missile (FBM) submarine, she commenced her first deterrent patrol in December 1960 with her Blue Crew on board. When she surfaced off Holy Loch, Scotland, on 8 March 1961, she had set a record for her type, cruising submerged 66 days and 22 hours. Patrick Henry was the first ballistic missile submarine to enter Holy Loch, and the first to go alongside the submarine tender USS Proteus for replenishment and routine repair.

Patrick Henry conducted 17 deterrent patrols from Holy Loch until December 1964 when she returned to Electric Boat. For 18 months she received complete and extensive overhaul and repair operations, including refueling of the S5W reactor plant and modifications to permit the handling of the Polaris A-3 missiles. After shakedown in mid-1966 off Puerto Rico and Cape Canaveral, Florida, Patrick Henry departed Charleston, South Carolina, in December for her eighteenth patrol, equipped with A-3 Polaris missiles and assigned to Submarine Squadron 14. On 1 March 1968, Patrick Henry completed her 22nd patrol at Holy Loch.

During the early 1970s, Patrick Henry's home port was Pearl Harbor, Hawaii.

In 1976, Patrick Henry moved to Mare Island Naval Shipyard at Vallejo, California, for refueling.

=== Demonstration and shakedown operations, 1978 ===
In the spring of 1978, the Patrick Henry underwent Demonstration and Shakedown Operations (DASO). The purpose of the DASO was to ensure that the submarine's crew could safely meet the stringent requirements for handling, maintaining and operating her strategic weapons system. It also confirmed that the submarine's crew was able to target and launch her submarine-launched ballistic missiles (SLBM) correctly and certified that the crew and submarine were ready for operational patrol. Additionally, system performance data was collected about the weapons system and submarine while in an operational environment, which evaluates the readiness and performance of the weapon system.

After transiting the Panama Canal, the Blue Crew successfully fired an A-3 Polaris missile off the coast of Cape Kennedy in July 1978, and the Gold Crew completed a successful missile firing several weeks later. The Gold Crew brought the Patrick Henry back through the Panama Canal and transited to Pearl Harbor. She remained with the Pacific Fleet into the 1980s.

=== Conversion to attack submarine, 1982 ===
In 1982 Patrick Henry and many of her sister ships had their ballistic missile tubes disabled and were reclassified as attack submarines (SSNs). Patrick Henry was redesignated SSN-599.

== Decommissioning and disposal ==
Patrick Henry was decommissioned and struck from the Naval Vessel Register on 25 May 1984, and as of 21 August 1997, she was disposed of through the Ship-Submarine recycling program at the Puget Sound Naval Shipyard.

== See also ==
- CSS Patrick Henry
