= Harold E. Shear =

United States Navy admiral

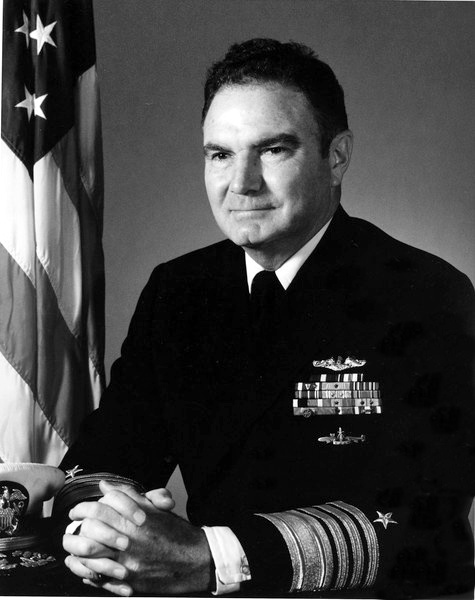

United States Maritime Administrator
- In office October 19, 1981 – May 31, 1985
- President: Ronald Reagan
- Preceded by: Robert J. Blackwell
- Succeeded by: John A. Gaughan

Personal details
- Born: December 6, 1918 New York City, New York, U.S.
- Died: February 1, 1999 (aged 80) Groton Long Point, Connecticut, U.S.
- Resting place: Arlington National Cemetery
- Nickname: Hal

Military service
- Allegiance: United States
- Branch/service: United States Navy
- Years of service: 1938–1980
- Rank: Admiral
- Commands: Allied Forces Southern Europe; Vice Chief of Naval Operations; United States Naval Forces Europe; USS Sacramento (AOE-1); USS Patrick Henry (SSBN-599); USS Becuna (SS-319)
- Battles/wars: World War II; Cold War; Vietnam War
- Awards: Defense Distinguished Service Medal; Navy Distinguished Service Medal (2); Silver Star

Harold Edson Shear (December 6, 1918 – February 1, 1999) was an admiral in the United States Navy.

Born in New York City, Shear entered the United States Naval Academy on June 10, 1938. He graduated early with the Class of 1942 just twelve days after December 7, 1941.

During World War II, Shear served on the USS Sawfish (SS-276), earning a Silver Star.

From 1952 to 1954, Shear was commanding officer of the diesel-electric submarine USS Becuna (SS-319). From August 1954 to January 1955, he attended the Armed Forces Staff College.

From 1959 to 1962, Shear served as the first Blue Crew commanding officer of the ballistic missile submarine USS Patrick Henry (SSBN-599).

From August 1964 to June 1965, Shear attended the National War College. From July 1965 to October 1966, he commanded the fast combat support ship USS Sacramento (AOE-1) in Southeast Asia.

As a full admiral, Shear held the commands of Commander in Chief, United States Naval Forces Europe from 1974 to 1975, Vice Chief of Naval Operations from 1975 to 1977, Commander in Chief, Allied Forces Southern Europe from July 18, 1977 to 1980. Retiring at the age of 61 in May 1980, he later became the administrator of the United States Maritime Administration.

Shear died at his home in Groton Long Point, Connecticut after a long illness in 1999. He had married Elizabeth Perry (June 19, 1917 – February 28, 2013) in Falmouth, Maine on April 16, 1942. Harold and Elizabeth Shear are interred in Section 59 of Arlington National Cemetery.

Military offices
Preceded by Worth H. Bagley	Vice Chief of Naval Operations; 1975–1977	Succeeded by Robert L. J. Long
