= UGM-96 Trident I =

Submarine-launched ballistic missile which entered service in 1979

UGM-96 Trident I (C4)
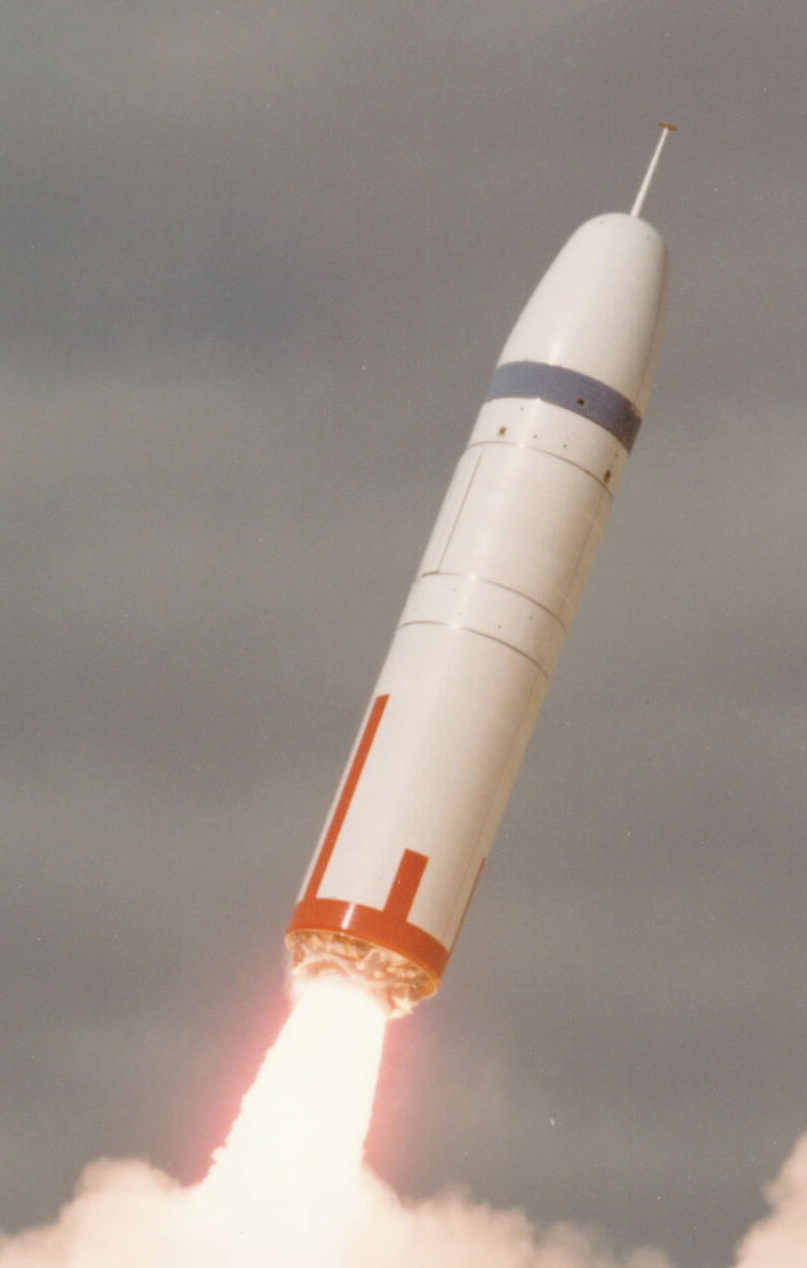
- The first launch of a Trident I with a drag-reducing aerospike, from Cape Canaveral, on 18 January 1977
- Type: SLBM
- Place of origin: United States

Service history
- In service: 1979 to 2005
- Used by: United States Navy

Production history
- Manufacturer: Lockheed Missiles Division

Specifications
- Mass: 74,630 pounds (33,850 kg)
- Length: 34.1 feet (10.39 m)
- Diameter: 74 inches (1.88 m)
- Warhead: Up to eight W76 warheads in Mark 4 RBs with a yield of 100 kilotonnes of TNT (420 TJ) each.
- Engine: Solid-fuel rocket
- Operational range: 4,600 miles (7,400 km)
- Guidance system: Astro-inertial guidance
- Accuracy: CEP: 229-500 m
- Launch platform: Ballistic Missile Submarine

The UGM-96 Trident I, or Trident C4, was an American submarine-launched ballistic missile (SLBM), built by Lockheed Martin Space Systems in Sunnyvale, California. First deployed in 1979, the Trident I replaced the Poseidon missile. The Trident was intended to have longer range than the Poseidon, allowing the fleet to maintain a longer distance from the target, enhancing survivability. It was retired in 2005, having been replaced by the Trident II.

The missile was a three-stage, solid-fueled system, capable of carrying up to eight W76 warheads in the Mark 4 RB.

Twelve James Madison- and Benjamin Franklin-class submarines were retrofitted with Trident I missiles, which replaced older Poseidon missiles. The first eight Ohio-class submarines were armed with Trident I missiles. The Ohio-class submarines were designed for the Trident II missiles, but used Trident I missiles until the Trident II missiles became available.

In 1980, the Royal Navy requested Trident I missiles under the Polaris Sales Agreement. In 1982, the agreement was changed to supply Trident II instead.

== See also ==
- Trident (missile)
- UGM-133 Trident II
