= Robert L. J. Long =

U.S. Navy admiral (1920–2002)

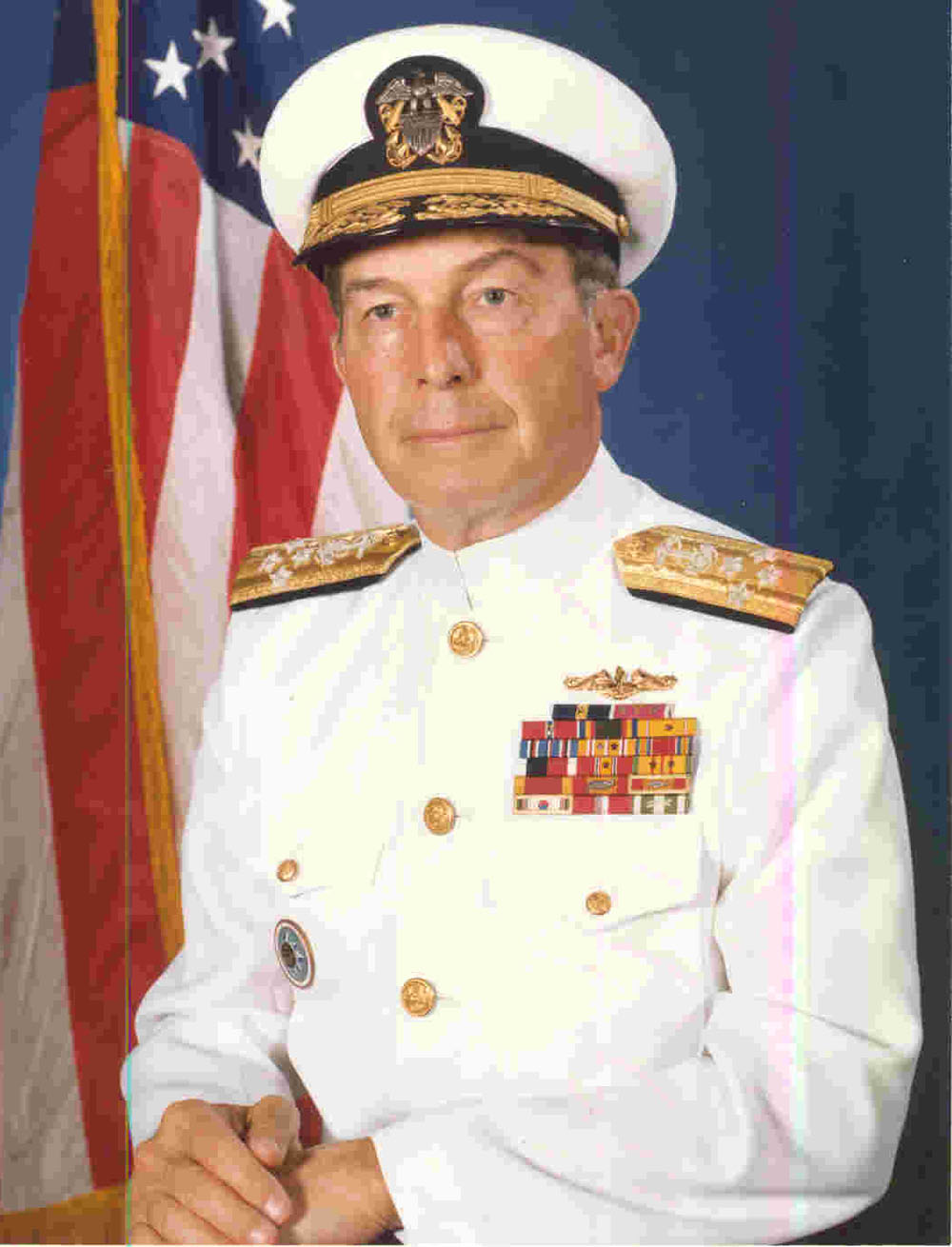
- Admiral Robert L. J. Long
- Born: May 29, 1920; Kansas City, Missouri, US
- Died: June 27, 2002 (aged 82); Bethesda, Maryland, US
- Military career
- Branch: United States Navy
- Service years: 1943–1983
- Rank: Admiral
- Commands: United States Pacific Command; Vice Chief of Naval Operations; Submarine Force Atlantic; USS Casimir Pulaski; USS Patrick Henry; USS Sea Leopard
- Conflicts: World War II; Vietnam War
- Awards: Navy Distinguished Service Medal (2); Legion of Merit (3); Bronze Star Medal

Robert Lyman John Long (May 29, 1920 – June 27, 2002) was a four-star admiral in the United States Navy who served as vice chief of Naval Operations from 1977 to 1979 and as commander in chief Pacific from 1979 to 1983.

== Early years and education ==
Long was born in Kansas City, Missouri, and grew up there. He was the son of Trigg Allen and Margaret (Franklin) Long. He attended Paseo High School, Kansas City Junior College, and Washington University in St. Louis, before enrolling at the United States Naval Academy.

== Naval career ==
Long graduated from the Naval Academy in 1943, served on the battleship USS Colorado in the Pacific and entered the submarine service after World War II. He saw combat in the Vietnam War and commanded the USS Sea Leopard, a diesel-powered submarine, the USS Patrick Henry and the USS Casimir Pulaski, nuclear-powered ballistic missile submarines.

Long also commanded the Submarine Force, United States Atlantic fleet; Submarines, Allied Command; and Submarine Force, Western Atlantic area. He was an executive assistant and naval aide to the Under Secretary of the Navy; Deputy Chief of Naval Operations and Vice Chief of Naval Operations.

Long's final navy posting was as Commander in Chief Pacific.

== Awards and decorations ==

Submarine Warfare Officer insignia
Navy Distinguished Service Medal with one gold award star		Legion of Merit with Combat V and two award stars
Bronze Star Medal with Combat V	Navy Unit Commendation	American Defense Service Medal with one bronze service star
American Campaign Medal	Asiatic-Pacific Campaign Medal with six service stars	World War II Victory Medal
Navy Occupation Service Medal	National Defense Service Medal with service star	Vietnam Service Medal with two service stars
National Order of Vietnam, Knight	Vietnam Gallantry Cross with palm	Korea Presidential Unit Citation
Vietnam Gallantry Cross Unit Citation	Philippine Liberation Medal	Vietnam Campaign Medal

== After the Navy ==
Following his retirement from the navy in 1983, Long was active in a variety of governmental and the military affairs. He served as the principal executive of President Ronald Reagan's fact-finding committee, the Long Commission, that investigated the 1983 Beirut barracks bombing attack that killed 241 United States Marines. The commission's report was widely praised for being tough and direct. The report found senior military officials responsible for security lapses and blamed the military chain of command for the disaster.

Long participated in the Security Review Commission led by General Richard G. Stilwell that grew out of the Walker spy case and which was tasked with review of security procedures conducted for security clearances. He was a member of an American election observer team sent to the Philippines in 1986 and headed by Senator Richard Lugar to observe the presidential election contest involving Ferdinand Marcos and Corazon Aquino. Long was teamed with the then first-term senator from Massachusetts John Kerry. He joined the Defense Policy Board in 1984, and was a part of the Advisory Committee on Command and Control of Nuclear Weapons, chaired by Jeane Kirkpatrick.

Long served as President of the Naval Academy Alumni Association from 1991 to 1994. He also served on several corporate boards, including Northrop, ConTel and GTE.

== Personal life ==
Long married Sara Katherine Helms on August 28, 1944, in Jacksonville, Florida. He died in National Naval Medical Center in Bethesda, Maryland, on June 27, 2002. His wife died May 14, 2004, in Annapolis, Maryland. They had three children and five grandchildren.

== Notes ==
Military offices
Preceded by Maurice F. Weisner	Commander, United States Pacific Command; 1979–1983	Succeeded by William J. Crowe
Preceded by Harold E. Shear	Vice Chief of Naval Operations; 1977–1979	Succeeded by James D. Watkins
