= Trident (missile) =

American class of submarine-launched ballistic missile

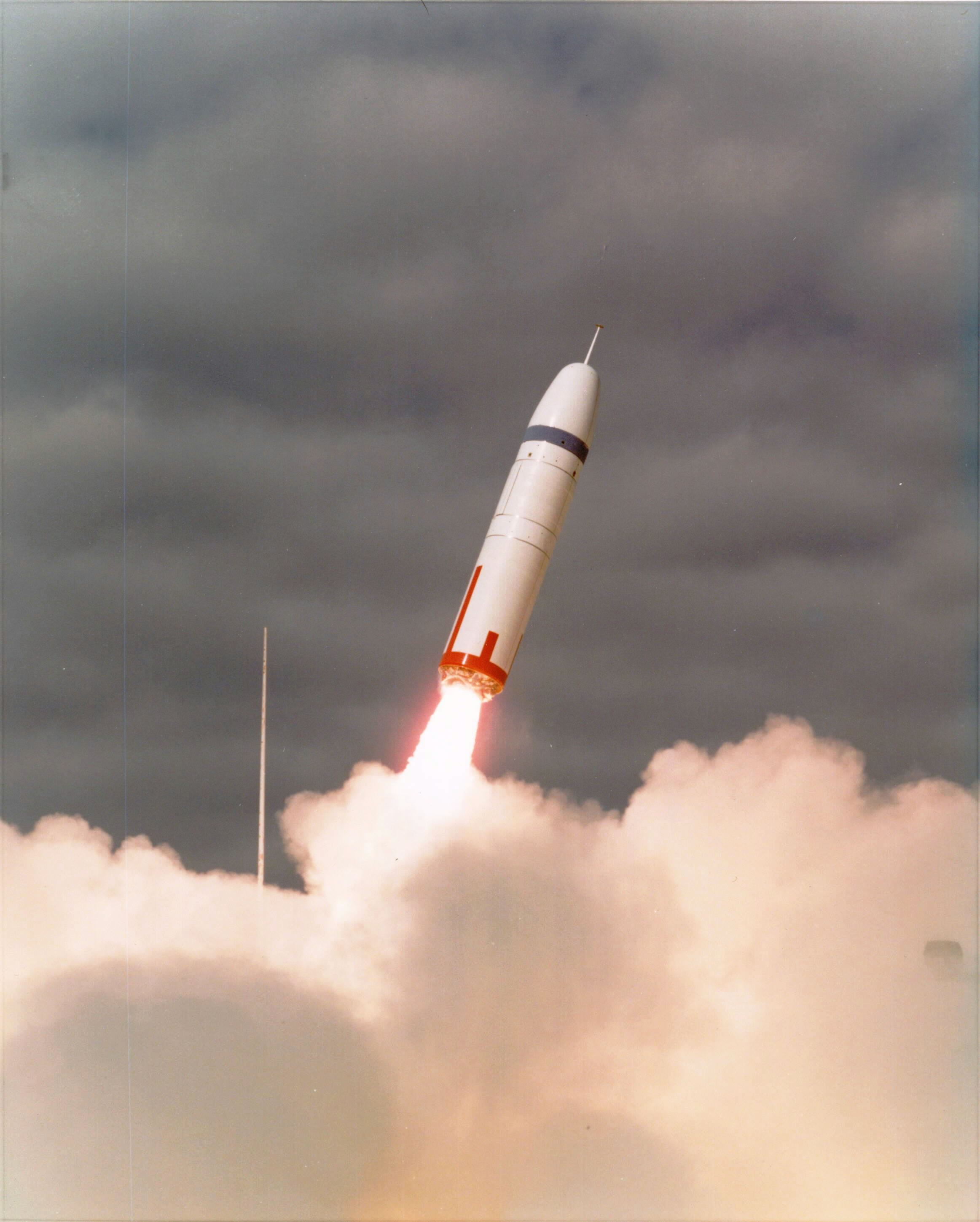
- Trident I first launch on 18 January 1977 at Cape Canaveral

Production history
- Manufacturer: Lockheed Martin Space Systems

Specifications
- Length: 13.41 m
- Width: 2.11 m
- Maximum speed: Mach 19
- Guidance system: Inertial guidance by stellar sighting

The Trident missile is a submarine-launched ballistic missile (SLBM) equipped with multiple independently targetable reentry vehicles (MIRV). Originally developed by Lockheed Missiles and Space Corporation, the missile is armed with thermonuclear warheads and is launched from nuclear-powered ballistic missile submarines (SSBNs). Trident missiles are carried by twelve United States Navy Ohio-class submarines, with American warheads, as well as four Royal Navy Vanguard-class submarines, with British warheads. The missile is named after the mythological trident of Neptune.

== Development ==
In 1971, the US Navy began studies of an advanced Undersea Long-range Missile System (ULMS). A Decision Coordinating Paper (DCP) for the ULMS was approved on 14 September 1971. ULMS program outlined a long-term modernization plan, which proposed the development of a longer-range missile termed ULMS II, which was to achieve twice the range of the existing Poseidon (ULMS I) missile. In addition to a longer-range missile, a larger submarine was proposed to replace the Lafayette, James Madison and Benjamin Franklin-class SSBNs in 1978. The ULMS II missile system was designed to be retrofitted to the existing SSBNs, while also being fitted to the proposed Ohio-class submarine.

In May 1972, the term ULMS II was replaced with Trident. The Trident was to be a larger, higher-performance missile with a range capacity greater than 6,000 miles (9,700 km). The first test of the Trident was on 18 January 1977 when an unarmed missile was launched from Cape Canaveral in Florida and traveled almost its full range of 4,600 miles (7,400 km), to a point in the South Atlantic Ocean near Ascension Island.

Trident I (designated as C4) was deployed in 1979 and retired in 2005. Its objective was to achieve performance similar to Poseidon (C3) but at extended range. Trident II (designated D5) had the objective of improved circular error probable (CEP), or accuracy, and was first deployed in 1990, and was planned to be in service for the thirty-year life of the submarines, until 2027.

Trident missiles are provided to the United Kingdom under the terms of the 1963 Polaris Sales Agreement which was modified in 1982 for Trident. British Prime Minister Margaret Thatcher wrote to President Carter on 10 July 1980, to request that he approve supply of Trident I missiles. However, in 1982 Thatcher wrote to President Reagan to request the United Kingdom be allowed to procure the Trident II system, the procurement of which had been accelerated by the US Navy. This was agreed upon in March 1982. Under the agreement, the United Kingdom paid an additional 5% of their total procurement cost of $2.5 billion to the US government as a research and development contribution.

The total cost of the Trident program thus far came to $39.546 billion in 2011, with a cost of $70 million per missile.

In 2009, the United States upgraded the warheads carried by American D5 missiles with an arming, fuzing and firing (AF&F) system called the "super-fuze" that allows them to time their detonation to target silos and bunkers more accurately, greatly increasing their effectiveness against hardened targets.

== Description ==
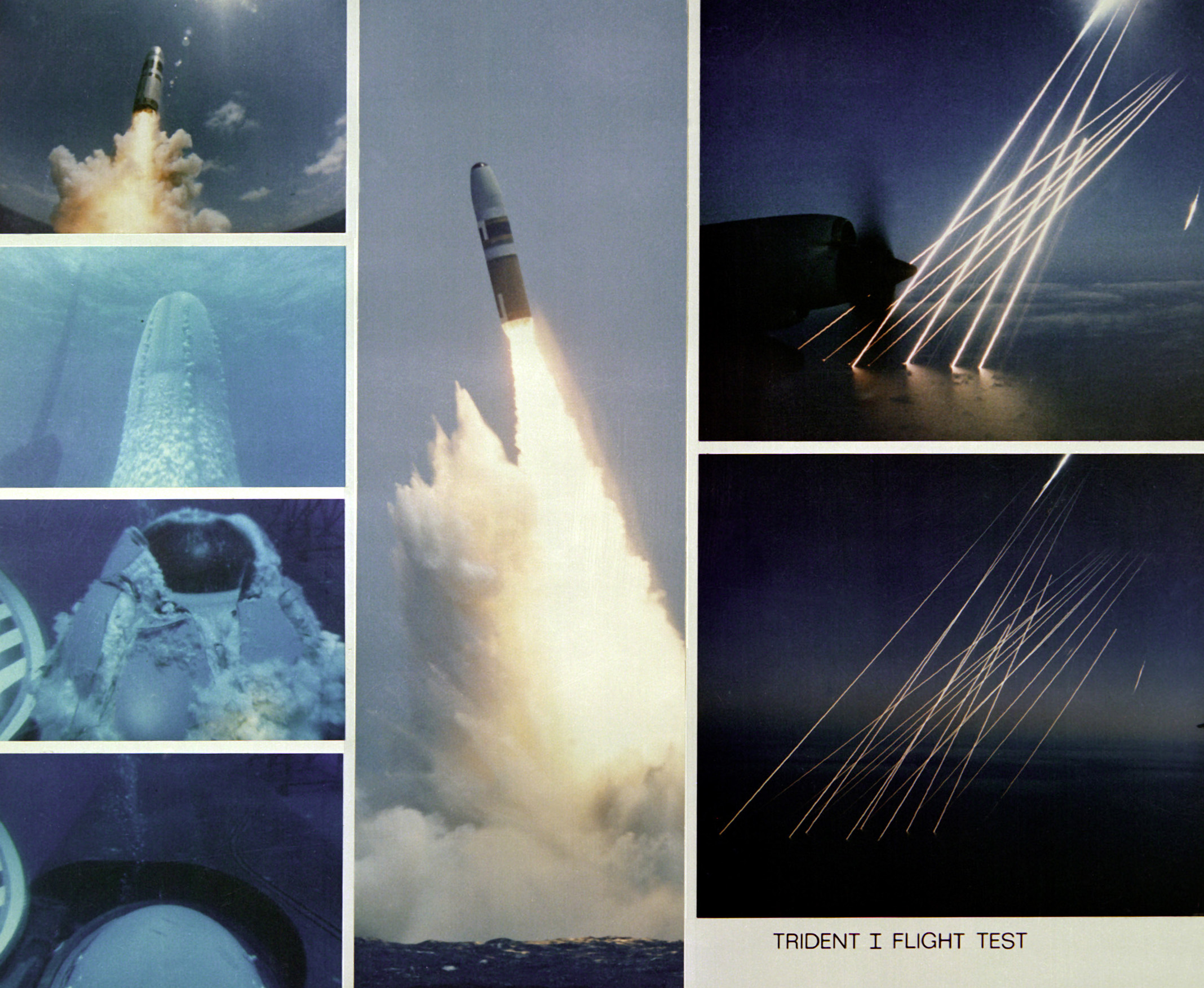
The launching of a Trident I C-4 missile from the submerged USS Francis Scott Key and the re-entry vehicles plunging into the Atlantic Ocean, 1981

The launch from the submarine occurs below the sea surface. The missiles are ejected from their tubes by igniting an explosive charge in a separate container. The energy from the blast is directed to a water tank, where the water is flash-vaporized to steam. The subsequent pressure spike is strong enough to eject the missile out of the tube and give it enough momentum to reach and clear the surface of the water. The missile is pressurized with nitrogen to prevent the intrusion of water into any internal spaces, which could damage the missile or add weight, destabilizing the missile. Should the missile fail to breach the surface of the water, there are several safety mechanisms that can either deactivate the missile before launch or guide the missile through an additional phase of launch. Inertial motion sensors are activated upon launch, and when the sensors detect downward acceleration after being blown out of the water, the first-stage motor ignites. The aerospike, a telescoping outward extension that halves aerodynamic drag, is then deployed, and the boost phase begins. When the third-stage motor fires, within two minutes of launch, the missile is traveling faster than 20,000 ft/s (6,000 m/s, 13,600 mph, 21,600 km/h, or Mach 18). Minutes after launch, the missile is outside the atmosphere and on a sub-orbital trajectory.

The guidance system for the missile was developed by the Charles Stark Draper Laboratory and is maintained by a joint Draper/General Dynamics Mission Systems facility. It is an inertial navigation system with an additional star tracker system (this combination is known as astro-inertial guidance), which is used to correct small position and velocity errors that result from launch condition uncertainties due to errors in the submarine navigation system and errors that may have accumulated in the guidance system during the flight due to imperfect instrument calibration. GPS has been used on some test flights but is assumed not to be available for a real mission. The fire control system was designed and continues to be maintained by General Dynamics Mission Systems. Once the star-sighting has been completed, the "bus" section of the missile maneuvers to achieve the various velocity vectors that will send the deployed multiple independent reentry vehicles to their individual targets. The downrange and crossrange dispersion of the targets remains classified.

The Trident was built in two variants: the I (C4) UGM-96A and II (D5) UGM-133A; however, these two missiles have little in common. While the C4, formerly known as EXPO (extended range poseidon), is just an improved version of the Poseidon C-3 missile, the Trident II D-5 has a completely new design (although with some technologies adopted from the C-4). The C4 and D5 designations put the missiles within the "family" that started in 1960 with Polaris (A1, A2 and A3) and continued with the 1971 Poseidon (C3). Both Trident versions are three-stage, solid-propellant, inertially guided missiles, and both guidance systems use a star sighting to improve overall weapons system accuracy.

=== Trident I (C4) UGM-96A ===
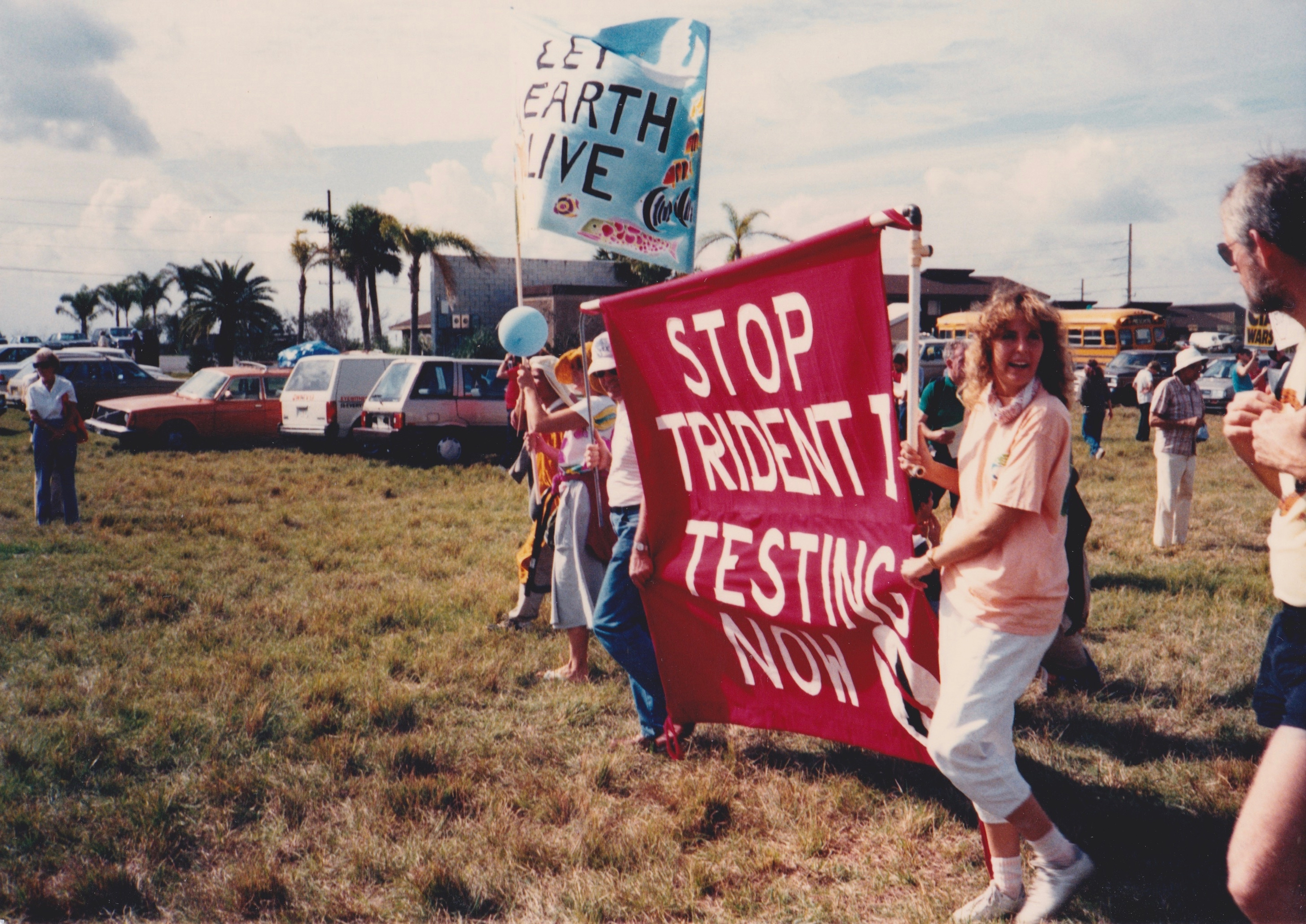
"Stop Trident I Testing Now" sign in 1987 protest at Cape Canaveral, Florida

The first eight Ohio-class submarines were built with the Trident I missiles.

=== Trident II (D5) UGM-133A ===
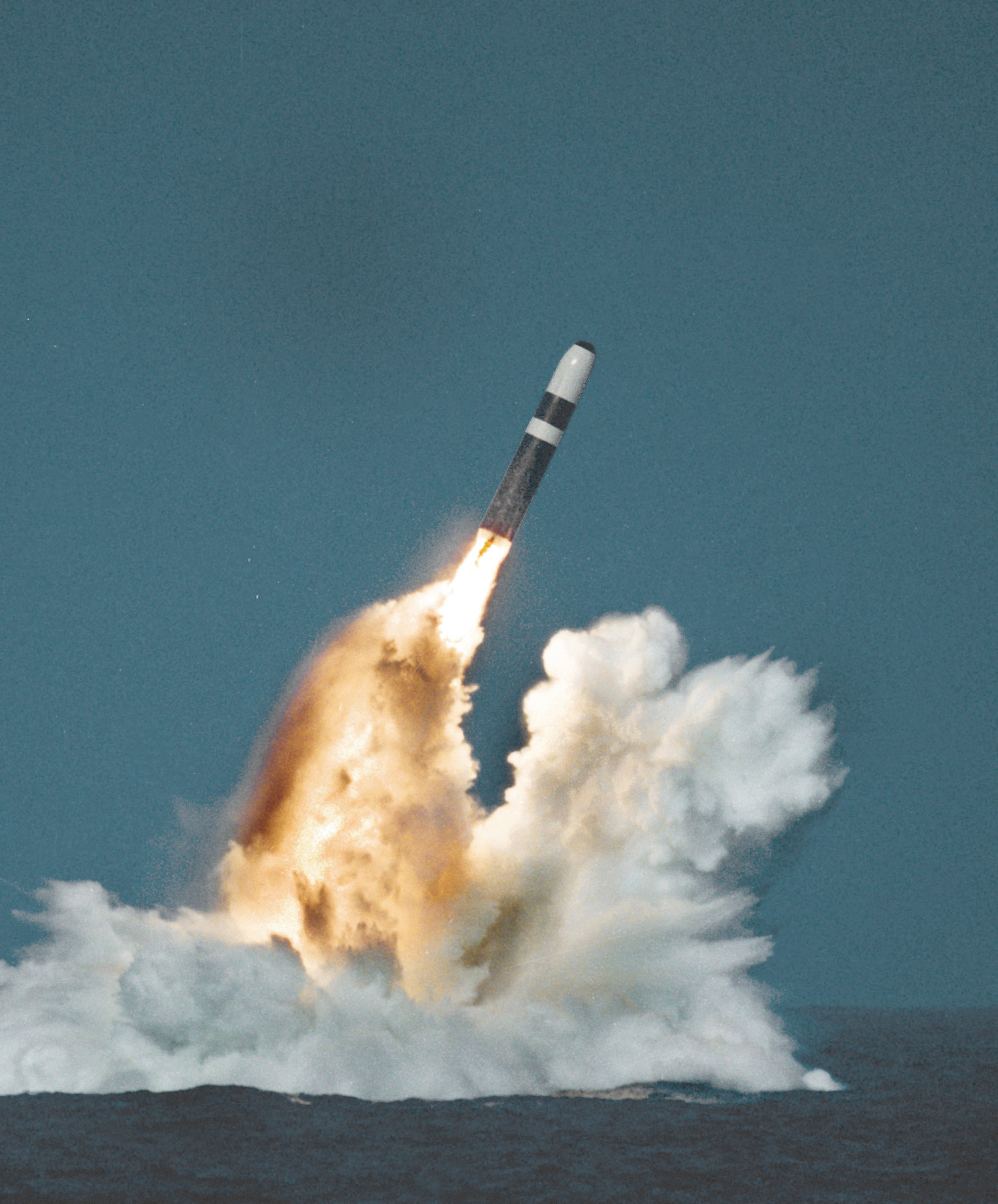
A Trident II missile fires its first stage after an underwater launch from a Royal Navy Vanguard-class ballistic missile submarine.

The second variant of the Trident is more sophisticated and can carry a heavier payload. It is accurate enough to be a first strike, counterforce, or second strike weapon. All three stages of the Trident II are made of graphite epoxy, making the missile much lighter. The Trident II was the original missile on the British Vanguard-class and American Ohio-class SSBNs from Tennessee on. The D5 missile is currently carried by fourteen Ohio-class and four Vanguard-class SSBNs. There have been 191 successful test flights of the D5 missile since design completion in 1989, the most recent being from USS Louisiana in September 2023. There have been fewer than 10 test flights that were failures, the most recent being from HMS Vanguard in January 2024. This is the second failure in a row for the Royal Navy after a launch from HMS Vengeance, one of Britain's four nuclear-armed submarines, off the coast of Florida in June 2016.

The Royal Navy operates their missiles from a shared pool, together with the Atlantic squadron of the U.S. Navy Ohio-class SSBNs at King's Bay, Georgia. The pool is 'co-mingled' and missiles are selected at random for loading on to either nation's submarines.

=== D5LE (D5 Life Extension Program) ===
In 2002, the United States Navy announced plans to extend the life of the submarines and the D5 missiles to the year 2040. This requires a D5 life extension program (D5LEP), which is currently underway. The main aim is to replace obsolete components at minimal cost by using commercial off the shelf (COTS) hardware; all the while maintaining the demonstrated performance of the existing Trident II missiles. In 2007, Lockheed Martin was awarded a total of $848 million in contracts to perform this and related work, which also includes upgrading the missiles' reentry systems. On the same day, Draper Labs was awarded $318 million for upgrade of the guidance system. Then-British Prime Minister Tony Blair outlined plans in Parliament on 4 December 2006 to build a new generation of submarines (Dreadnought-class) to carry existing Trident missiles, and join the D5LE project to refurbish them.

The first flight test of a D-5 LE subsystem, the MK 6 Mod 1 guidance system, in demonstration and shakedown operation (DASO)-23, took place on USS Tennessee on 22 February 2012. This was almost exactly 22 years after the first Trident II missile was launched from Tennessee in February 1990.

=== D5LE2 (D5 Life Extension Program 2) ===
US Navy Vice Admiral Johnny Wolfe, in charge of overall submarine weapons systems procurement, indicated in 2020 that he had initiated trade studies to apply lessons from the D5LE program to extend the Trident II's lifespan to 2084. Wolfe said he expected the first D5LE2 missiles to be deployed aboard the ninth Columbia-class submarine by FY 2039.

== Conventional Trident ==
The Pentagon proposed the Conventional Trident Modification program in 2006 to diversify its strategic options, as part of a broader long-term strategy to develop worldwide rapid strike capabilities, dubbed "Prompt Global Strike".

The $503 million program would have converted existing Trident II missiles (presumably two missiles per submarine) into conventional weapons, by fitting them with modified Mk4 reentry vehicles equipped with GPS for navigation update and a reentry guidance and control (trajectory correction) segment to perform 30-foot (10 m) class impact accuracy. No explosive is said to be used since the reentry vehicle's mass and hypersonic impact velocity provide sufficient mechanical energy and "effect". The second conventional warhead version is a fragmentation version that would disperse thousands of tungsten rods which could obliterate an area of 3,000 square feet (280 m^{2}). It offered the promise of accurate conventional strikes with little warning and flight time.

The primary drawback of using conventionally armed ballistic missiles is that to missile warning systems, they are virtually indistinguishable from nuclear armed missiles. This leaves open the likelihood that other nuclear-armed countries might mistake it for a nuclear launch which could provoke a counterattack. For that reason among others, this project raised a substantial debate before the US Congress for the FY07 Defense budget, but also internationally. Russian President Vladimir Putin, among others, warned that the project would increase the danger of accidental nuclear war. "The launch of such a missile could… provoke a full-scale counterattack using strategic nuclear forces," Putin said in May 2006.

== Operators ==
- Royal Navy
- United States Navy

== See also ==
- Agni-VI
- British Trident system
- ICBM
- JL-1
- JL-2
- JL-3
- K Missile family
- M45 (missile)
- M51 (missile)
- Nuclear weapons and the United Kingdom
- Nuclear weapons and the United States
- R-29RMU2.1 "Layner"
- RSM-56 Bulava
