= Drag-reducing aerospike =

Device which reduces drag on missiles

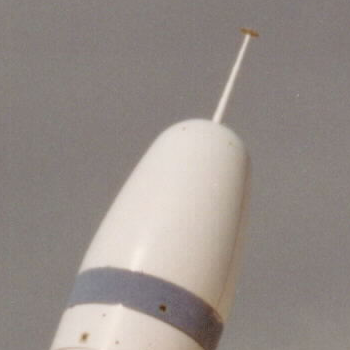
UGM-96 Trident I first launch on 18 January 1977 at Cape Canaveral. The thin antenna-like structure mounted on the nose cone is the aerospike, which is composed of two parts. 1) The Extensible Boom is the long, slender, slightly tapered cylindrical structure; the wider "underside" is mounted to the nose cone. 2) "flat, circular, metallic" plates (brownish/yellow color, above). mounted on the end of the boom, perpendicular to the long axis of the missile.

A drag-reducing aerospike is a device (see nose cone design) used to reduce the forebody pressure aerodynamic drag of blunt bodies at supersonic speeds. The aerospike creates a detached shock ahead of the body. Between the shock and the forebody a zone of recirculating flow occurs which acts like a more streamlined forebody profile, reducing the drag.

== Development ==
Aerospike deploying at 0.42

This concept was used on the UGM-96 Trident I and is estimated to have increased the range by 550 km. The Trident aerospike consists of a flat circular plate mounted on an extensible boom which is deployed shortly after the missile breaks through the surface of the water after launch from the submarine. Once the missile leaves the atmosphere, after about two minutes of flight, the spike is jettisoned along with the nose fairing. The use of the aerospike allowed a much blunter nose shape, providing increased internal volume for payload and propulsion without increasing the drag. This was required because the Trident I C-4 was fitted with a third propulsion stage to achieve the desired increase in range over the Poseidon C-3 missile it replaced. To fit within the existing submarine launch tubes the third-stage motor had to be mounted in the center of the post-boost vehicle with the reentry vehicles arranged around the motor.

At the same time (middle 1970s) an aerospike was developed in KB Mashinostroyeniya (KBM) for the 9M39 surface-to-air missile of 9K38 Igla MANPADS (in order to diminish heating of infrared homing seeker fairing and reduce wave drag), giving the name to the whole system (Russian: игла means 'needle'). A simplified Igla-1 version with a different kind of target seeker featured a tripod instead of a 'needle' for the same purpose.

Further development of this concept has resulted in the "air-spike". This is formed by concentrated energy, either from an electric arc torch or a pulsed laser, projected forwards from the body, which produces a region of low density hot air ahead of the body.

In 1995 at the 33rd Aerospace Sciences Meeting, it was reported that tests were performed with an aerospike-protected missile dome to Mach 6, obtaining quantitative surface pressure and temperature-rise data on the feasibility of using aerospikes on hypersonic missiles.

== Missiles with aerospikes ==
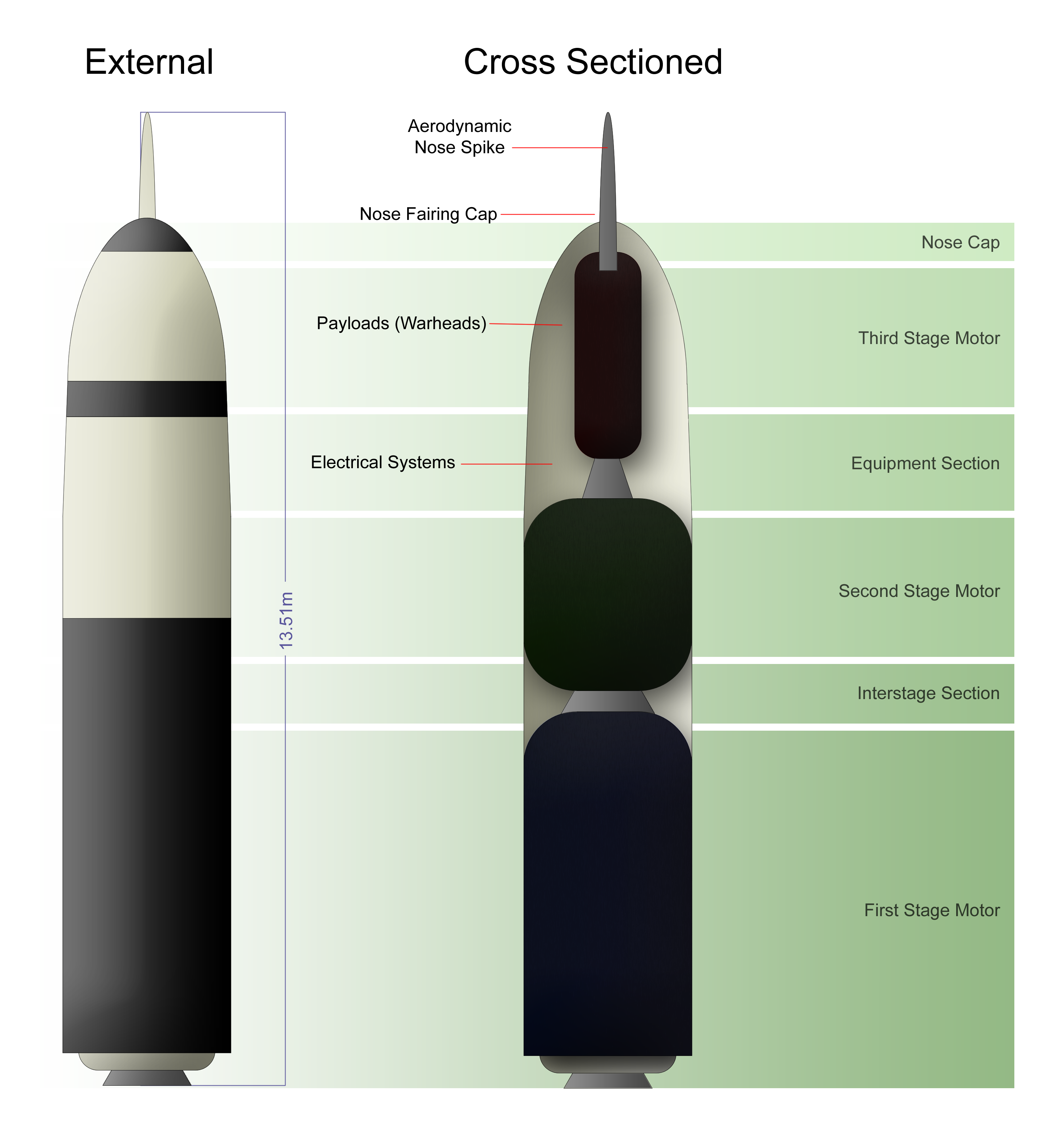
Diagram showing aerospike on a Trident D5 missile

USSR

- 9K38 Igla (MANPADS)

US

- UGM-96 Trident I
- UGM-133 Trident II

France

- M51 (missile)

== See also ==
- Index of aviation articles
