= Demonstration and Shakedown Operation =

Missile tests by US and UK navies

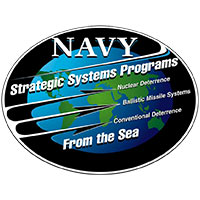
Logo used by the US Navy Strategic Systems Programs, which carries out shakedown operations

A Demonstration and Shakedown Operation (DASO) is a series of missile tests conducted by the United States Navy and the Royal Navy. These tests are employed to validate a weapon system (SLBM) and ensure a submarine crew's readiness to use that system. A shakedown operation usually occurs after a refueling and overhaul process or construction of a new submarine. Testing of missile systems allows collection of flight-data, and examinations of submarine launch platforms.

The first DASO test occurred July 20, 1960 on the USS George Washington, using the Polaris A-1. Modern tests use the UGM-133 Trident II, launching from an Ohio-class submarine.
