= Matt Parr =

Royal Navy Rear Admiral (born 1962)

Rear Admiral Matt Parr CB
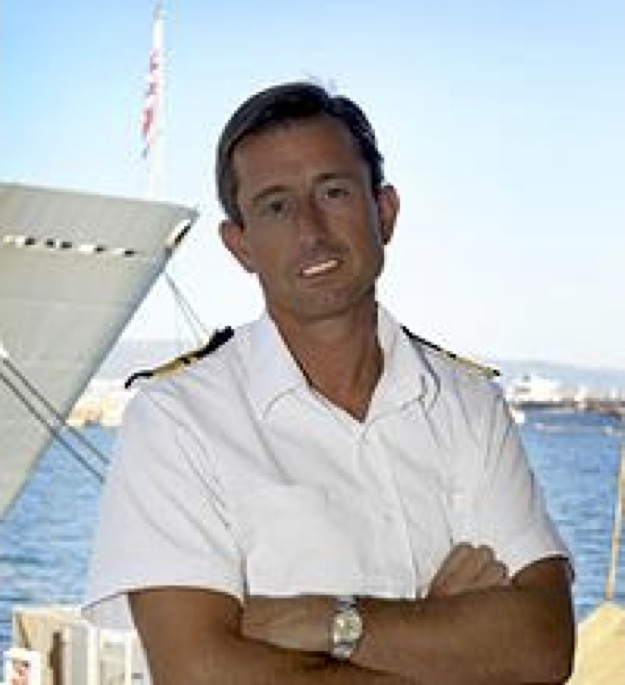
- Rear Admiral Matthew Parr
- Born: 20 August 1962 (age 64); Coventry, England, UK
- Military career
- Allegiance: United Kingdom
- Branch: Royal Navy
- Service years: 1984–2016
- Rank: Rear Admiral
- Commands: Commander Operations; British Forces Gibraltar; 6th Frigate Squadron; HMS Montrose; HMS Trafalgar
- Awards: Companion of the Order of the Bath

Rear Admiral Matthew John Parr, CB (born 20 August 1962) is a retired Royal Navy officer who has served as Commander Operations and Rear Admiral, Submarines and is currently an Inspector of Constabulary and Fire & Rescue Services.

== Early life and education ==
Parr was born on 20 August 1962 in Coventry, England. He studied geography at Hatfield College, Durham, graduating with a Bachelor of Science (BSc) degree in 1983.

== Naval career ==
Parr joined the Royal Navy in 1984. He completed the Submarine Command Course in 1993 and then became executive officer of the submarine HMS Triumph. He became an Operations Officer at Permanent Joint Headquarters in Northwood in 1995 and was then given command of the submarine HMS Trafalgar in 1997.

Parr became commanding officer of the frigate HMS Montrose as well as Captain of the 6th Frigate Squadron in 2001, Deputy Flag Officer Sea Training at Plymouth in 2003 and then returned to Northwood to join the Fleet Operations in 2005.

He went on to be commander, British Forces Gibraltar in May 2007, Director of Operational Capability at the Ministry of Defence in March 2009, and Principal Staff Officer to the Chief of the Defence Staff in December 2010.

He became Assistant Chief of the Naval Staff in December 2011, which was re-designated Assistant Chief of the Naval Staff (Policy) in April 2012, and Commander Operations and Rear Admiral, Submarines in May 2013. Parr retired in April 2016.

Parr was appointed Companion of the Order of the Bath (CB) in the 2014 New Year Honours.

== Her Majesty's Inspectorate of Constabulary ==
On leaving the navy, Parr was appointed to Her Majesty's Inspectorate of Constabulary (HMIC). He has additionally been an HM Inspector of Fire and Rescue Services since 2017. In June 2022, after the Metropolitan Police was placed in special measures by HMIC, Parr wrote to Commissioner Stephen House to outline "substantial and persistent concerns" regarding the force's performance, including its "inexperienced" workforce, its backlog of online child abuse cases, the stop and search of the athlete Bianca Williams, the strip-searching of children, the murder of Sarah Everard, and the force's approach to internal corruption.

Military offices
Preceded by Sir Philip Jones	Assistant Chief of the Naval Staff; 2009–2012	Post renamed
New title	Assistant Chief of the Naval Staff (Policy); 2012–2013	Succeeded by Clive Johnstone
Preceded by Ian Corder	Commander Operations; 2013–2015	Succeeded by Robert Tarrant
