= Rich Cantrill =

Royal Marines officer

Major-General Rich Cantrill OBE MC
- Military career
- Allegiance: United Kingdom
- Branch: Royal Marines
- Service years: 1996–present
- Rank: Major-General
- Commands: 3 Commando Brigade (2020–2022); 42 Commando (2014–2016)
- Conflicts: Sierra Leone Civil War; War in Afghanistan
- Awards: Officer of the Order of the British Empire; Military Cross

Major-General Richard John Cantrill, OBE, MC (born 26 March 1974) is a senior Royal Marines officer. In 2024 he became Commander Operations, the first Royal Marine to hold the post.

== Early life and education ==
Cantrill was born on 26 March 1974 in Aldershot, Hampshire, England. He was educated at Reigate Grammar School, an independent school in Reigate, Surrey. He studied geography at Durham University, where he was a member of the College of St Hild and St Bede, graduating with a Bachelor of Science (BSc) degree in 1995. He later undertook postgraduate study at King's College London, completing a Master of Arts (MA) degree in defence studies in 2011.

== Military career ==
Cantrill joined the Royal Marines in 1996. His career as a junior officer was as a mountain and cold weather warfare specialist with 3 Commando Brigade. He deployed to Sierra Leone in 2000 as part of Operation Palliser; he commanded 42 Commando's forward recce screen deep in the jungle. He was promoted to major in 2004 and, in 2008, deployed to Afghanistan as officer commanding L Company, 42 Commando. He was awarded the Military Cross (MC) "for gallant and distinguished services in Afghanistan during the period 1st October 2008 to 31st March 2009": he successfully led the company during a three-day assault on Kasnishin, a Taliban stronghold, during the deployment.

In 2010, he became military assistant to the Deputy Chief of the Defence Staff (Military Strategy and Operations). He was promoted to lieutenant colonel on 30 June 2011, having held the rank in an acting capacity. In the 2014 New Year Honours, he was appointed an Officer of the Order of the British Empire (OBE). Also in 2014, he was made commanding officer of 42 Commando. In 2016, he was promoted to colonel and served as commanding officer commando training at the Commando Training Centre Royal Marines, before being made the chief of staff for the Commander UK Amphibious Forces.

Cantrill joined the Ministry of Defence as the assistant head for counter-terrorism and UK Operations in 2018. He was appointed to command 3 Commando Brigade on 2 September 2020. He returned to a staff post in 2022 as assistant chief of staff operations at the Permanent Joint Headquarters. In January 2024, it was announced that he would be the next Commander Operations, the first Royal Marine to hold the post, with the promotion to major general on 6 May 2024.

=== Ribbon bar ===
Military offices
Preceded by Edward Ahlgren	Commander Operations; 2024–present	Incumbent
