= Simon Asquith =

British Navy Vice Admiral (born 1972)

Vice Admiral Simon Asquith CB OBE
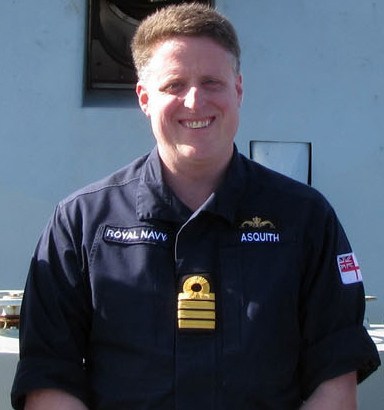
- Captain Asquith in 2015
- Born: 7 March 1972 (age 54); Bradford, England
- Military career
- Allegiance: United Kingdom
- Branch: Royal Navy
- Service years: 1990–present
- Rank: Vice Admiral
- Commands: Commander Operations; HMS Portland; HMS Talent
- Awards: Companion of the Order of the Bath; Officer of the Order of the British Empire

Vice Admiral Simon Phillip Asquith, CB, OBE (born 7 March 1972) is a senior Royal Navy officer who has served as chief of staff to Supreme Allied Commander Transformation, NATO since 2024.

He was Director of Submarines for the Royal Navy from April 2022 to April 2024. then was succeeded by Rear Admiral Andy Perks.

== Early life ==
Asquith was educated at the University of Plymouth (BA Maritime Studies) and King's College London (MA Defence Studies, 2012).

== Naval career ==
Asquith joined the Royal Navy in September 1990, and went on to become commanding officer of the submarine HMS Talent in 2008. After that he became commanding officer of the frigate HMS Portland in September 2015, Assistant Director Higher Command and Staff Course in January 2016, and Deputy Commander of UK Maritime Component Command in the Middle East in May 2017. He then became Chief of Staff, Standing Joint Force in April 2018 and, after being promoted to rear admiral on 14 October 2019, he became Commander Operations in November 2019. He was promoted to vice admiral on 8 July 2024, and now serves as chief of staff to Supreme Allied Commander Transformation, NATO.

Asquith was appointed an Officer of the Order of the British Empire in the 2012 New Year Honours, and a Companion of the Order of the Bath in the 2022 Birthday Honours.

Military offices
Preceded by Paul Halton	Commander Operations; 2019–2022	Succeeded by Edward Ahlgren
New title	Director of Submarines; 2022–2024	Succeeded by Rear Admiral Andy Perks
