= Mark Anderson (Royal Navy officer) =

Royal Navy officer

Rear Admiral Mark Anderson CB
- Military career
- Allegiance: United Kingdom
- Branch: Royal Navy
- Service years: 1974–2011
- Rank: Rear Admiral
- Commands: Commander Operations; HMS Marlborough; HMS Talent
- Awards: Companion of the Order of the Bath

Rear Admiral Mark Anderson, CB is a former Royal Navy officer who served as Commander Operations and Rear Admiral, Submarines.

== Naval career ==
Educated at the University of Manchester, Anderson joined the Royal Navy in 1974 and was appointed commanding officer of the submarine HMS Talent in 1993.

He became Military Assistant to the Chief of Defence Logistics in May 2000, Commanding Officer of the frigate HMS Marlborough in August 2002 and Director Equipment Capability (Underwater Effects) in March 2003 before moving on to become the Chief of the Defence Staff's Liaison Officer to the United States Joint Chiefs of Staff Committee in July 2007, and Commander Operations and Rear Admiral, Submarines in January 2009. He retired from the Royal Navy in March 2011.

In retirement Anderson became Strategy Director of Sonar & Undersea Systems and then Group Marketing Director at Ultra Electronics.

Military offices
Preceded by David Cooke	Commander Operations; 2009–2011	Succeeded by Ian Corder
