= Timothy Laurence =

Retired Royal Navy officer (born 1955)

Vice Admiral Sir Timothy Laurence GCVO CB CSM ADC FSA
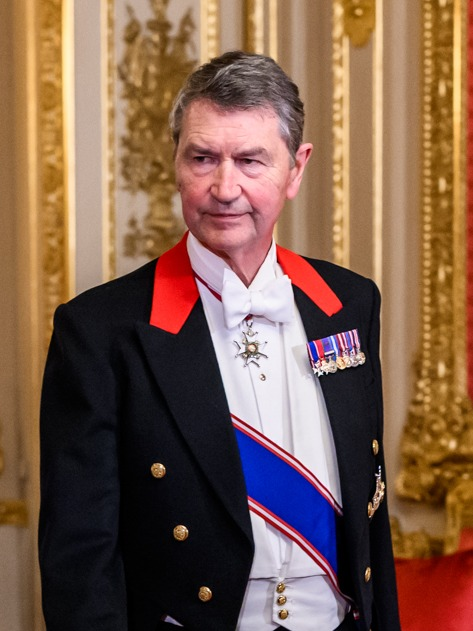
- Laurence in 2025
- Born: 1 March 1955 (age 71); Camberwell, London, England
- Education: University College, Durham (BSc)
- Spouse: Anne, Princess Royal (m. 1992)
- Relatives: Sir Perceval Maitland Laurence (great-uncle); Sir Robert Moorsom (great-great-great-grandfather); Lord Young of Acton (cousin); Levy baronets (kinsmen)
- Military career
- Allegiance: United Kingdom
- Branch: Royal Navy
- Service years: 1973–2011
- Commands: Chief Executive, Defence Estates (2007–2010); HMS Montrose (1996); HMS Cumberland (1995–1996); HMS Boxer (1990–1992); HMS Cygnet (1982–1983)
- Conflicts: NATO intervention in Bosnia and Herzegovina
- Awards: Knight Grand Cross of the Royal Victorian Order; Companion of the Order of the Bath; Mentioned in Despatches; Companion of the Order of the Star of Melanesia (Papua New Guinea)

Vice Admiral Sir Timothy James Hamilton Laurence (born 1 March 1955) is a British retired Royal Navy officer and the husband of Anne, Princess Royal, the only sister of King Charles III.

Laurence served as equerry to Queen Elizabeth II from 1986 to 1989, before marrying her daughter, Princess Anne, in 1992.

== Early life and education ==
Timothy James Hamilton Laurence was born on 1 March 1955 in Camberwell, South London, the younger son of Commander Guy Stewart Laurence RN (1896–1982; later a sales executive for MAN Marine Engines), and Barbara Alison Laurence (née Symons, 1928–2019). He has an elder brother, Jonathan Dobree Laurence (born 1952). The family descends patrilineally from Zaccaria Levy, a Jewish merchant who arrived in England from Venice in the late eighteenth century, possibly having originated in Baghdad, and his wife, Simcha Ana, née Montefiore. Their son Joseph adopted the surname Laurence.

Laurence was educated at The New Beacon Preparatory School and later at Sevenoaks School, Kent, before studying geography at University College, Durham, on a Naval Scholarship. He graduated with an Upper-Second Class Bachelor of Science (Hons). During his undergraduate years, he edited the student newspaper, Palatinate.

== Naval career ==
Laurence was commissioned into the Royal Navy as a midshipman on 1 January 1973, and became an acting sub-lieutenant on 1 January 1975. After leaving Durham he completed his initial training at the Britannia Royal Naval College Dartmouth, and was posted to the Plymouth-based frigate HMS Aurora. He was promoted lieutenant on 1 March 1977, ten months ahead of the normal schedule. In 1978, he was attached to the training establishment HMS Vernon, and, in the following year, he served in the Ton-class minesweeper HMS Pollington.

Laurence then served briefly as Second Navigating Officer of the Royal Yacht HMY Britannia, and, from 1980 to 1982, he was Navigating Officer of the destroyer HMS Sheffield. In 1982, he took command of the patrol boat HMS Cygnet off the Northern Irish coast, deployed on patrols against IRA gunrunners. For distinguished service in Northern Ireland, Laurence was mentioned in despatches.

After attending HMS Dryad for the Principal Warfare Officer course, he was posted to the frigate HMS Alacrity. Laurence was promoted lieutenant commander on 1 March 1985. In March 1986, he attended the Royal Australian Navy Tactics Course at HMAS Watson, Sydney, during which he was notified of his first staff appointment as equerry to the Queen, a post he held from 11 October 1986 until 16 September 1989. He was promoted commander on 31 December 1988.

Elected Hudson Visiting Fellow at St Antony's College, Oxford, in 1989, Laurence wrote a paper on the relationship between humanitarian assistance and peacekeeping. In October 1989, he was posted to the frigate HMS Boxer, and took over as commanding officer on 30 January 1990, at the age of 34. Between 1992 and 1994, Laurence served on the Naval Staff at the Ministry of Defence, London. On 16 May 1994, he was appointed the First Military Assistant to the Secretary of State for Defence, Malcolm Rifkind, providing military advice in the private office.

Laurence was promoted as captain on 30 June 1995, and, until 1996, commanded the frigate HMS Cumberland. In May 1996, the ship returned from the Adriatic, where HMS Cumberland served in the NATO-led IFOR Task Force. On 27 August 1996, Laurence was appointed Commanding Officer of the frigate HMS Montrose, as well as Captain of the 6th Frigate Squadron. Until October 1996, the ship was deployed to the South Atlantic on patrol of the Falkland Islands, a British Overseas Territory. In July 1997, Laurence returned to the Ministry of Defence, first on the Naval Staff and then, from June 1998, on promotion to Commodore, as a member of the Implementation Team for the 1998 Strategic Defence Review.

== Later career ==
He was then posted to the Joint Services Command and Staff College as a commodore, serving as Assistant Commandant (Navy) from 15 June 1999. From 2001 to the spring of 2004, Laurence returned to the Ministry of Defence as Director of Navy Resources and Programmes.

Promoted rear admiral on 5 July 2004, Laurence was appointed Assistant Chief of the Defence Staff, with responsibility for Resources and Plans, on 30 April 2007. He was further promoted vice admiral and became chief executive of Defence Estates (later renamed Defence Infrastructure Organisation).

In 2008, Laurence was admitted as a Younger Brother of Trinity House.

He became Head of Profession for the British Government's Property Asset Management community in July 2009. The community includes practitioners in construction procurement, estates and property management, and facilities and contracts management. He was awarded Honorary Membership by the Royal Institution of Chartered Surveyors (Hon. MRICS) later that year.

Laurence retired from Royal Navy service in August 2010 and subsequently developed a portfolio of mainly non‑executive and charitable interests, with a particular emphasis on property and regeneration. He served on the board of the project-management company Capita Symonds until 2014 and is non-executive chairman of the property developers Dorchester Regeneration. He is also non-executive chairman of Purfleet Centre Regeneration, a newly established company specialising in site reclamation and regeneration. He served as a senior military adviser to PA Consulting until 2015.

Laurence served as Master of the Worshipful Company of Coachmakers and Coach Harness Makers for 2010/11.

Chairman of the English Heritage Trust between April 2015 and December 2022, Laurence also served as vice-chairman of the Commonwealth War Graves Commission until 30 June 2019. A Trustee of the HMS Victory Preservation Company, his transport interests also include membership of the Great Western Advisory Board.

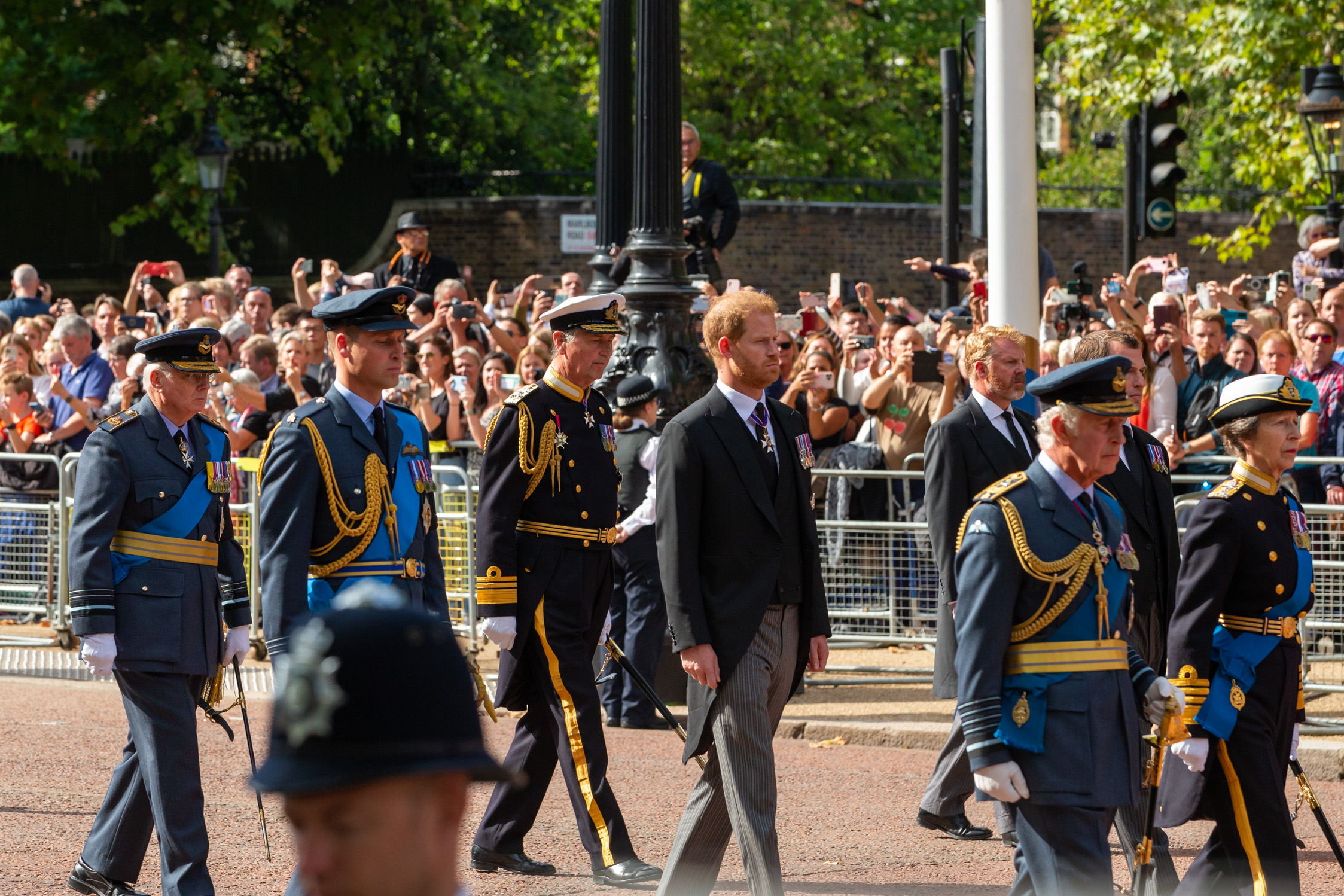
Laurence (third from left) processing with members of the royal family to the lying-in-state of Elizabeth II, 14 September 2022

He served as President of Kent CCC for 2020, and was elected a Fellow of the Society of Antiquaries (FSA) in 2021.

In December 2023, Laurence was appointed Chairman of the Science Museum Group.

In January 2025, he was forced to withdraw from an official visit to South Africa with the Princess Royal after suffering from a torn ligament while working on their Gloucestershire estate, Gatcombe Park.

== Marriage ==
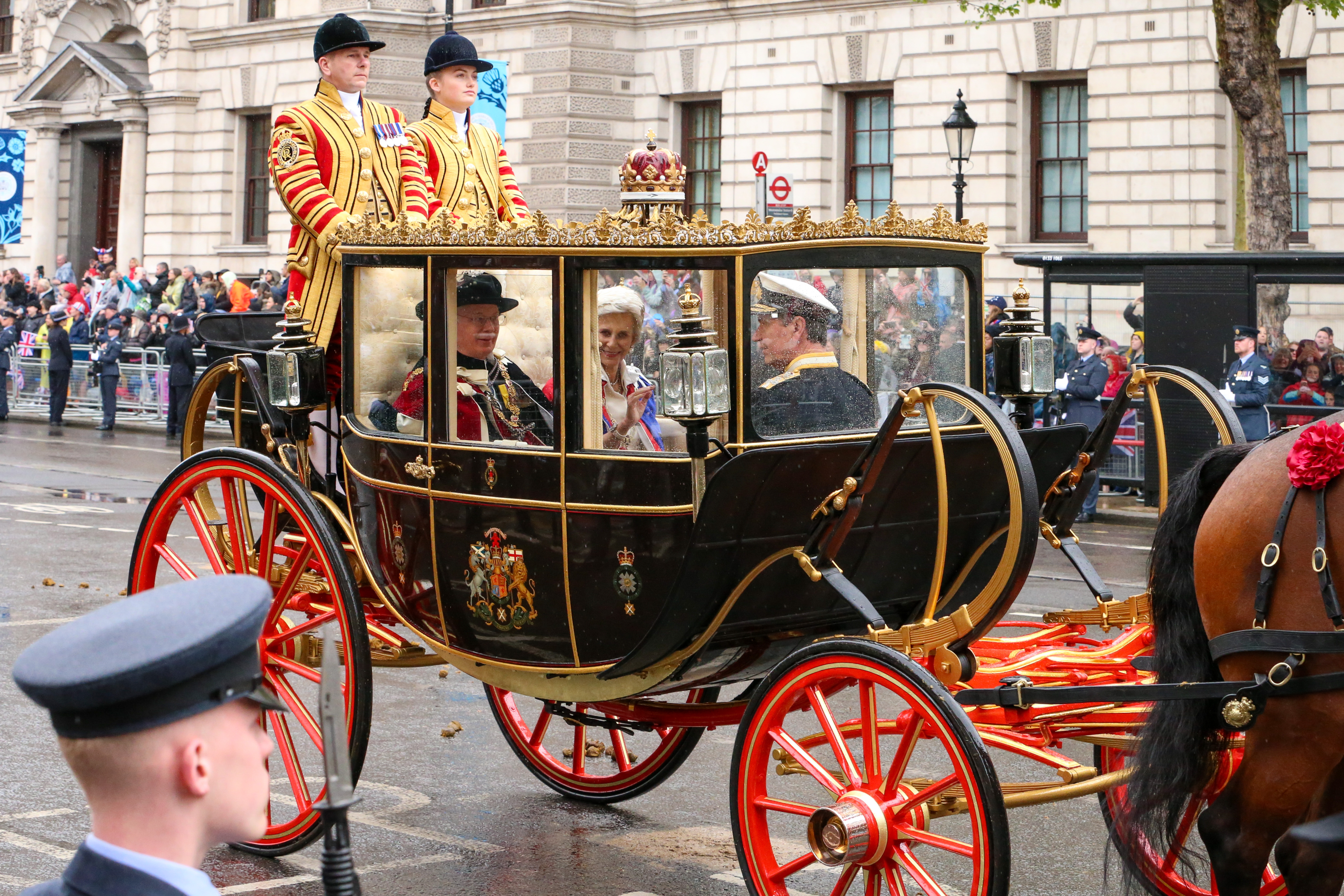
Laurence rode in the Scottish State Coach after the coronation of King Charles III on 6 May 2023, alongside Richard, Duke of Gloucester, and his wife, Birgitte, Duchess of Gloucester.

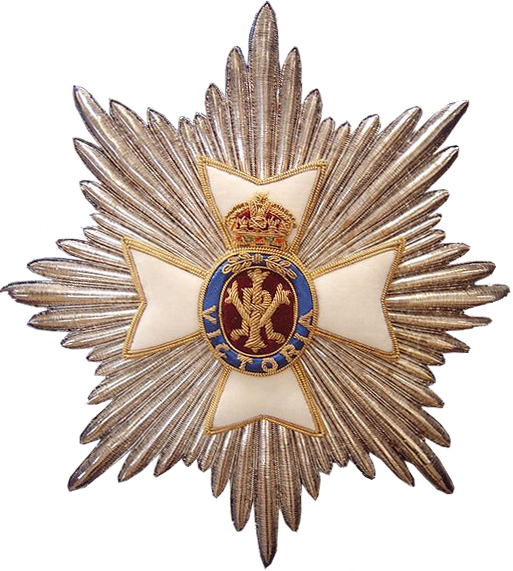
GCVO star

Laurence met Princess Anne when serving as an equerry to Queen Elizabeth II in 1986, at a time when it was widely rumoured that her first marriage to Captain Mark Phillips was breaking down. In 1989, the existence of private letters from Laurence to the Princess was revealed by The Sun, although the sender was not named. Buckingham Palace issued a statement:

"The stolen letters were addressed to the Princess Royal by Commander Timothy Laurence, the Queen’s Equerry. We have nothing to say about the contents of personal letters sent to Her Royal Highness by a friend which were stolen and which are the subject of a police investigation."

Laurence and Anne married on 12 December 1992 in a Church of Scotland ceremony at Crathie Kirk, near Balmoral Castle (the Church of Scotland permits second marriages for divorcees). Although he was not elevated to the peerage upon marrying into the royal family, Laurence was appointed a Personal Aide-de-Camp to the Queen in 2008, and was invested in June 2011 as a Knight Commander of the Royal Victorian Order. Advanced as a Knight Grand Cross of the Royal Victorian Order in August 2025, Laurence will be able to display his coat of arms, once proven by the College of Arms, on an armorial plate at the Savoy Chapel alongside other GCVOs.

Anne kept her country estate, Gatcombe Park in Gloucestershire, after her divorce from Phillips. After she married Laurence, the couple leased a flat in Dolphin Square, Westminster, as their London residence. They later moved to apartments in Buckingham Palace and now keep an apartment at St James's Palace.

== Honours ==
- 1983 (18 October): Mentioned in Despatches for distinguished service in Northern Ireland during the period 1 February 1983 to 30 April 1983.
- 2004 (1 August): Appointed Personal Aide-de-Camp to the Sovereign (ADC)
- 2021 (9 December): Elected Fellow of the Society of Antiquaries of London (FSA)
- 2023 (27 September): Appointed patron of the International Maritime Rescue Federation (IMRF)

Ribbon	Description	Notes
	Royal Victorian Order	Appointed Member (MVO) on 23 August 1989; Appointed Knight Commander (KCVO) on 14 June 2011; Appointed Knight Grand Cross (GCVO) on 21 August 2025
	Most Honourable Order of the Bath	Appointed Companion (CB) on 16 June 2007
	General Service Medal (1962)	18 October 1983, with 1 Clasp Northern Ireland and the oak leaf emblem for being mentioned in despatches
	Queen Elizabeth II Golden Jubilee Medal	6 February 2002
	Queen Elizabeth II Diamond Jubilee Medal	6 February 2012
	Queen Elizabeth II Platinum Jubilee Medal	6 February 2022
	King Charles III Coronation Medal	6 May 2023
	Order of the Star of Melanesia	Appointed Companion on 29 September 2005

== Authored articles ==
- Laurence, Sir Tim (26 May 2020). "The Dunkirk evacuation was no 'miracle'". The Daily Telegraph.
- Laurence, Sir Tim (5 December 2020). "Like it or not, building the Stonehenge tunnel is the best way to preserve this historic site". The Daily Telegraph.
- Laurence, Sir Tim (1 May 2022). "More than ever, we must remember our historic bond with Poland and Ukraine". The Daily Telegraph.
- Laurence, Sir Tim (29 December 2022). "We'd all lose out if our heritage crumbled away". The Daily Telegraph.

Military offices
Preceded by Vice-Admiral; Peter Dunt	Chief Executive of Defence Estates; 2007–2011	Succeeded by Andrew Manley as Chief Executive, Defence Infrastructure Organisation
