= Robert Tarrant =

Royal Navy Rear Admiral (born 1961)

Rear Admiral Robert Tarrant CB
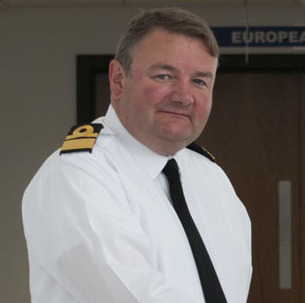
- Rear Admiral Tarrant in 2014
- Born: 1961 (age 64–65)
- Military career
- Allegiance: United Kingdom
- Branch: Royal Navy
- Service years: 1979–2017
- Rank: Rear Admiral
- Commands: Commander Operations; Commander United Kingdom Maritime Forces; HMS Endurance; HMS Talent
- Conflicts: Falklands War
- Awards: Companion of the Order of the Bath

Rear Admiral Robert Kenneth Tarrant, CB (born 1961) is a retired Royal Navy officer who served as Commander Operations from 2015 to 2017.

== Naval career ==
Educated at Cheltenham College, Tarrant joined the Royal Navy in 1979 and saw action in the destroyer HMS Antrim during the Falklands War in 1982. He was promoted to commander on 30 June 1997, and given command of the submarine HMS Talent. After promotion to captain on 30 June 2004, he took command of the patrol ship HMS Endurance in 2007. Promoted to commodore on 27 November 2008, he went on to be Director of Naval Staff in December 2008. He remained the post until August 2011. After attending the Royal College of Defence Studies, he became Commander of Combined Task Force 150, responsible for maritime security from the Red Sea to the Gulf of Oman, in September 2012, and was promoted to rear admiral on 14 January 2013, as he became Commander United Kingdom Maritime Forces as well as fulfilling the role of Operation Commander of the European Union Naval Force Somalia Operation Atalanta. He served as Commander Operations from October 2015 to October 2017. He retired from the Navy on 11 May 2018.

Tarrant was appointed a Companion of the Order of the Bath in the 2016 Birthday Honours.

Military offices
Preceded by Duncan Potts	Commander United Kingdom Maritime Forces; 2013–2014	Succeeded by Tony Radakin
Preceded by Matt Parr	Commander Operations; 2015–2017	Succeeded by Paul Halton
