= David Cooke (Royal Navy officer) =

Rear Admiral David Cooke CB MBE
- Born: 15 August 1955; Valletta, Malta
- Died: 1 December 2014 (aged 59)
- Military career
- Allegiance: United Kingdom
- Branch: Royal Navy
- Service years: 1973–2009
- Rank: Rear Admiral
- Commands: Commander Operations; HMS Cumberland; HMS Torbay; HMS Onslaught
- Awards: Companion of the Order of the Bath; Member of the Order of the British Empire

Rear Admiral David John Cooke, CB, MBE (15 August 1955 – 1 December 2014) was a Royal Navy officer who served in submarines and later played an important part in defence procurement. He rose to flag rank and was put in charge of all of Britain's naval assets and made chief of the submarine service.

== Naval career ==
Cooke joined the Royal Navy in 1973 and, after specialising in submarines, became commanding officer of the submarine HMS Onslaught in 1986, of the submarine HMS Torbay in 1992 and of the frigate HMS Cumberland in 2000. He went on to be Director of Equipment Planning at the Ministry of Defence in 2001, Deputy Commander Strike Force at NATO Headquarters in Naples in July 2004 and Commander Operations and Rear Admiral, Submarines in September 2006, before retiring in January 2009.

In retirement Cooke became Clerk of Christ's Hospital Foundation. He died on 1 December 2014 at the age of 59.

Military offices
Preceded by Paul Lambert	Commander Operations; 2006–2009	Succeeded by Mark Anderson
