= Edward Ahlgren =

Royal Navy Vice Admiral (born 1971)

Vice Admiral Edward Ahlgren OBE
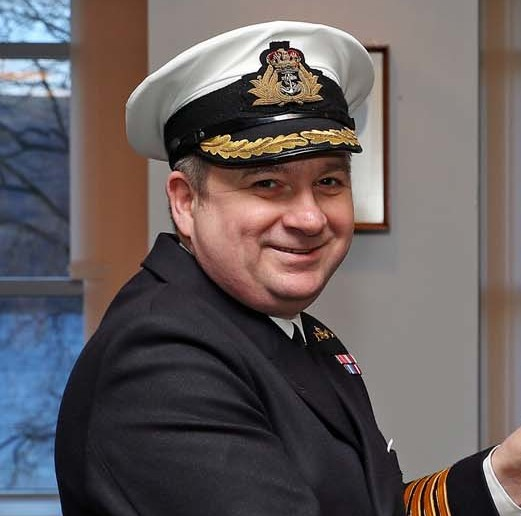
- Ahlgren in 2018
- Born: 1971 (age 54–55)
- Military career
- Allegiance: United Kingdom
- Branch: Royal Navy
- Service years: 1992 –
- Rank: Vice Admiral
- Commands: HMS Tireless; HMS Torbay
- Awards: Officer of the Order of the British Empire; Officer of the Legion of Merit (United States)

Vice Admiral Edward Graham Ahlgren, OBE (born 5 August 1971) is a senior Royal Navy officer who previously served as Commander Operations.

He was educated at Rossall School and King's College London (MA Defence Studies, 2011).

== Naval career ==
Educated at Rossall School, Ahlgren joined the Royal Navy on 1 January 1992. He commanded the submarines HMS Tireless and HMS Torbay, before becoming operations officer for the Fleet Battle Staff. After a tour on counter-terrorism duties in Bahrain, he became Defence attaché at the British Embassy in Cairo. He then became deputy commander of Combined Maritime Forces in February 2021 and Commander Operations in April 2022. He was promoted to vice-admiral on 1 May 2024.

He was appointed an Officer of the Order of the British Empire in the 2011 Birthday Honours.

He was awarded the Legion of Merit by the United States; the award was authorised on 14 April 2023.

Military offices
| Preceded by Simon Asquith | Commander Operations; 2022–2024 | Succeeded by Richard Cantrill |
