= Buster Howes =

British Royal Marines officer

Major General Buster Howes CB OBE
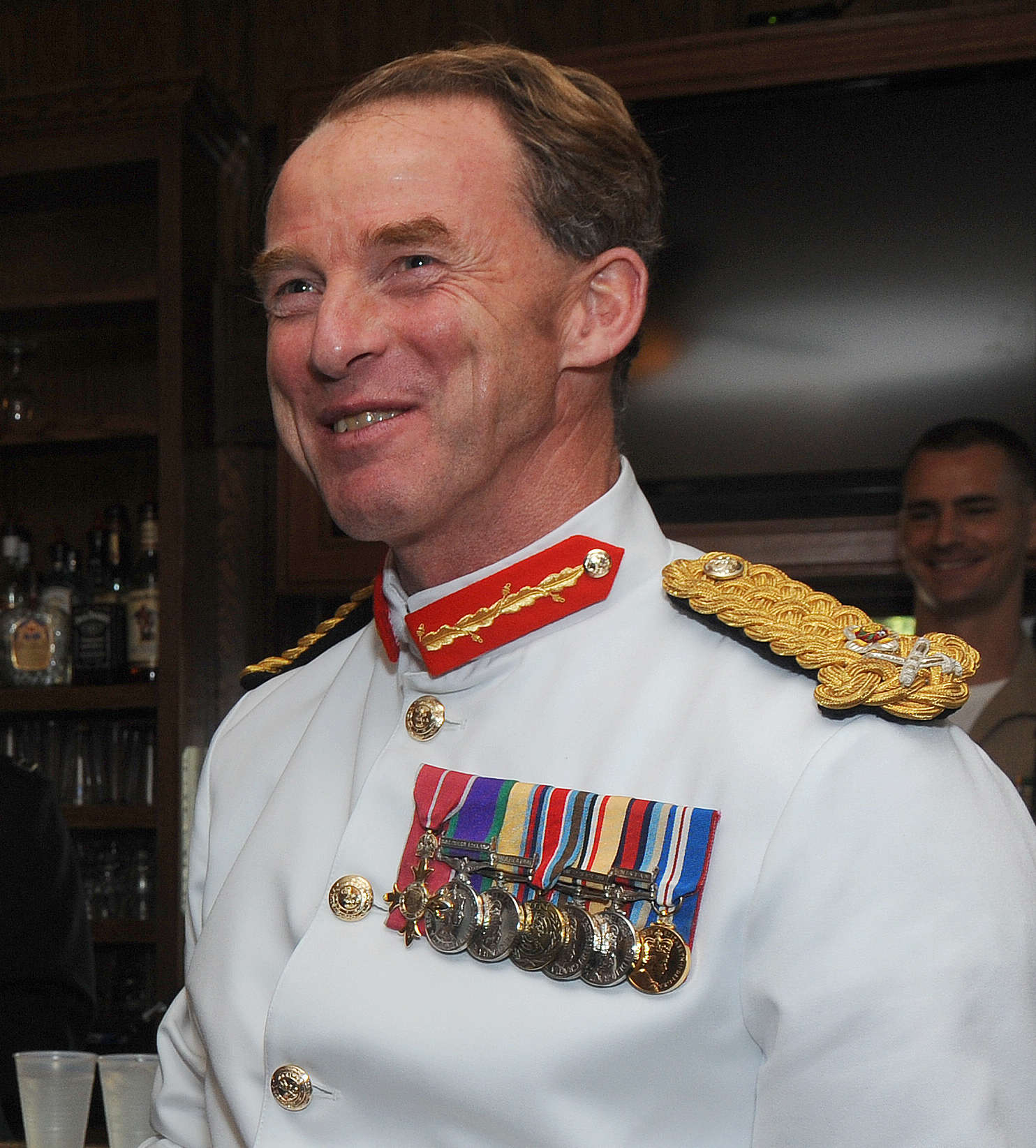
- Howes in 2011
- Born: 22 March 1960 (age 66); Newcastle upon Tyne, England
- Military career
- Allegiance: United Kingdom
- Branch: Royal Marines
- Service years: 1982–2015
- Rank: Major General
- Commands: Commandant General Royal Marines; 3 Commando Brigade; 42 Commando
- Conflicts: Operation Banner; Gulf War; Bosnian War; Iraq War; War in Afghanistan
- Awards: Companion of the Order of the Bath; Officer of the Order of the British Empire

Major General Francis Hedley Roberton "Buster" Howes, CB, OBE (born 22 March 1960) is a former Royal Marines officer who served as Commandant General Royal Marines from February 2010 to December 2011.

== Early life ==
Howes was educated at Christ's Hospital, a private school in Horsham, West Sussex. He studied chemistry at the University of York, graduating with a Bachelor of Science degree. He completed a Master of Arts degree in strategic studies at the University of London.

== Military career ==
Howes was commissioned into the Royal Marines in 1982. He became a troop commander in 42 Commando and had his first posting to Northern Ireland. After training as a Mountain Leader, he transferred to 45 Commando. He served in the Gulf War while on secondment to the United States Marine Corps. He served as a planner in the Rapid Reaction Force Operations Staff of United Nations Protection Force during the Bosnian War in 1995.

Howes led 42 Commando during the 2003 invasion of Iraq, for which he was appointed an Officer of the Order of the British Empire. He became Chief Joint Coordination and Effects in Headquarters ISAF in Afghanistan in 2007, and Director of Naval Staff later that year. He went on to be commander of 3 Commando Brigade in April 2008, Head of Overseas Operations in the Ministry of Defence in 2009 and Commandant General Royal Marines in February 2010. He was Head of the British Defence Staff – US and Defence Attaché in Washington, D.C. from 2011 to 2015, and was appointed a Companion of the Order of the Bath in the 2013 Birthday Honours.

== Later career ==
In June 2020, Howes was appointed Chief Executive of the Royal Edinburgh Military Tattoo after having served as a non-executive director of the organisation since 2015.

Military offices
Preceded by Andy Salmon	Commandant General Royal Marines; 2010–2011	Succeeded by Ed Davis
Preceded by Michael Harwood	Head of the British Defence Staff – US and Defence Attaché; 2011–2015	Succeeded by Richard Cripwell
