= Paul Halton =

Royal Navy Rear Admiral

Rear Admiral Paul Halton OBE
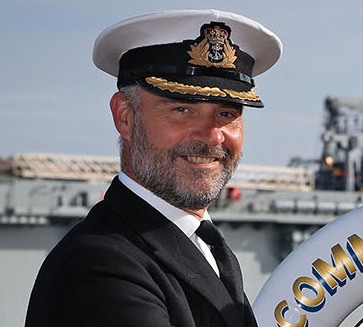
- Rear Admiral Halton in 2017
- Military career
- Allegiance: United Kingdom
- Branch: Royal Navy
- Service years: 1987–2023
- Rank: Rear Admiral
- Commands: Commander Operations; HMS Spartan
- Conflicts: War in Afghanistan
- Awards: Officer of the Order of the British Empire

Rear Admiral Paul Vincent Halton, OBE is a retired senior Royal Navy officer who served as Commander Operations from October 2017 to November 2019.

== Naval career ==
Halton joined the Royal Navy in September 1987, and went on to serve as commanding officer of the submarine HMS Spartan. He was promoted to captain on 11 January 2010. After becoming Flag Officer Sea Training Director (North), he was deployed as Deputy Director of operations in Afghanistan in 2012. He was posted as in a senior staff officer role at the Ministry of Defence in June 2013 and then became Commodore, Devonport Flotilla in March 2015. He was appointed Commander Operations from October 2017.

On 17 September 2019, a Jane's report said that Rear Admiral Halton was to hand over the appointment of Commander Operations and to take up the post of Rear Admiral Submarines and Assistant Chief of the Naval Staff, Submarines later in the year. However, Halton assumed the post of Director, Submarine Readiness, Submarine Delivery Agency in January 2020.

He retired from the Royal Navy in March 2023.

Military offices
Preceded by Robert Tarrant	Commander Operations; 2017–2019	Succeeded by Simon Asquith
