= Naval Staff Directorate =

British naval command staff directorate

Directorate overview
- Formed: 1985
- Dissolved: Active
- Jurisdiction: United Kingdom
- Headquarters: Ministry of Defence, Whitehall, London
- Directorate executive: Commodore Naval Staff
- Parent department: Ministry of Defence (United Kingdom)

The Naval Staff Directorate is a military staff directorate of the Royal Navy created in 1985 as the Directorate of Naval Staff Duties. The directorate was originally part of the British Navy Department and is now under the Ministry of Defence (Naval Staff). It is currently administered by the Commodore Naval Staff now based at the Ministry of Defence, probably in the MOD Main Building in Whitehall.

== History ==
The directorate was established in November 1985 when its chief responsibilities was to provide administrative support to both the Admiralty Board and the Navy Board. Oversight of the directorate was initially the responsibility of the Office of the Assistant Chief of the Naval Staff which by 2017 was the responsibility of the Office of the Assistant Chief of the Naval Staff (Policy).

The directorate was administered by the Director of Naval Staff Duties from inception until June 2007 when his title was changed to Director of Naval Staff until 2014 when it was changed again to Commodore Naval Staff who in other official documents is sometimes styled as Head of Naval Staff.

The Naval Staff Directorate is currently providing support to the First Sea Lord, ACNS (Policy), and the Navy Board. Circa 2014 the directorate was supported in its role by a Secretariat.

== Heads of the Directorate ==
Included:

=== Director of Naval Staff Duties ===
1. Captain Roger C. Dimmock: January–February 1985
2. Captain E. S. Jeremy Larken: February–April 1985
3. Captain the Hon. Nicholas J. Hill-Norton: April 1985–June 1987
4. Captain Geoffrey W.R. Biggs: June 1987–August 1989
5. Captain Michael C. Boyce: August 1989–April 1991
6. Captain Michael P. Gretton: April 1991–July 1993
7. Captain Alan W.J. West: July 1993 – 1994
8. Commodore John H.S. McAnally: 1994–1995
9. Commodore Christopher D. Stanford: 1995–1997
10. Brigadier Robert A. Fry. RM: 1997–1999
11. Commodore David G. Snelson: 1999–September 2000
12. Commodore Trevor A. Soar: September 2000–August 2002
13. Commodore Robert G. Cooling: August 2002 – 2003
14. Commodore Michael Kimmons: 2003–February 2005
15. Commodore Thomas A. Cunningham: February 2005–June 2007

=== Director of Naval Staff ===
1. Brigadier Francis H.R. Howes. RM: June 2007–April 2008
2. Commodore Clive C.C. Johnstone: April–December 2008
3. Commodore Robert K. Tarrant: December 2008–August 2011
4. Commodore Neil L. Brown: August 2011–November 2013
5. Brigadier Peter S. Cameron. RM: November 2013–April 2014

=== Commodore Naval Staff ===
1. Commodore James M. Lines: April 2014–February 2016
2. Commodore Nicholas S. Roberts: February 2016–September 2017
3. Commodore Iain S. Lower: September 2017–February 2020
4. Commodore Paul S. Beattie February 2020 – onwards
