= Commander Operations (Royal Navy) =

British Royal Navy appointment

- Ensign of the Royal Navy
- Incumbent; Major-General Richard Cantrill since 26 April 2022
- Ministry of Defence
- Abbreviation: COMOPS
- Reports to: Fleet Commander
- Seat: Northwood Headquarters, Hertfordshire, England
- Nominator: Secretary of State for Defence
- Appointer: Prime Minister; Subject to formal approval by the King-in-Council
- Term length: Not fixed (typically 1–3 years)
- Inaugural holder: Rear-Admiral Roger Lane-Nott
- Formation: 1993
- Website: royalnavy.mod.uk

The Commander Operations (COMOPS) is a senior Royal Navy or Royal Marines officer based at Northwood Headquarters who exercises operational command of all national maritime operations on behalf of the Fleet Commander. The post was established in 1993.

Commander Operations previously held the additional posts of Commander Task Force (CTF) 311 (UK attack submarines) and CTF 345 (UK nuclear missile submarines). In 2015, Rear Admiral John Weale was appointed Rear Admiral Submarines/Assistant Chief of Naval Staff Submarines, while Rear Admiral Robert Tarrant was made Commander Operations (Royal Navy), separating the two posts.

== Post-holders ==
Post-holders have included:

- 1993–1996 Rear-Admiral Roger Lane-Nott
- 1996–1998 Rear-Admiral James Perowne
- 1998–2002 Rear-Admiral Robert Stevens
- 2002–2004 Rear-Admiral Niall Kilgour
- 2004–2006 Rear-Admiral Paul Lambert
- 2006–2009 Rear-Admiral David Cooke
- 2009–2011 Rear-Admiral Mark Anderson
- 2011–2013 Rear-Admiral Ian Corder
- 2013–2015 Rear-Admiral Matt Parr
- 2015–2017 Rear-Admiral Robert Tarrant
- 2017–2019 Rear-Admiral Paul Halton
- 2019–2022 Rear-Admiral Simon Asquith
- 2022–2024 Rear-Admiral Edward Ahlgren
- 2024–present Major-General Richard Cantrill

== Subordinate formations 2016-2017 ==
Included:

- 3 Commando Brigade
- Surface Flotilla, Commodore Craig Wood, Commander, Surface Flotilla, in post April 2020
- Submarine Flotilla
