= Niall Kilgour =

Royal Navy Rear Admiral (born 1950)

Rear Admiral Niall Kilgour CB
- Born: 4 March 1950 (age 76)
- Military career
- Allegiance: United Kingdom
- Branch: Royal Navy
- Service years: 1968–2004
- Rank: Rear Admiral
- Commands: Flag Officer Submarines Commander Operations; 6th Frigate Squadron HMS Montrose; HMS Norfolk
- Conflicts: Sierra Leone Civil War
- Awards: Companion of the Order of the Bath; Queen's Commendation for Valuable Service

Rear Admiral Niall Stuart Roderick Kilgour, CB (born 4 March 1950) is a former Royal Navy officer who served as Commander Operations and Rear Admiral, Submarines.

== Naval career ==
Educated at Hazelwood School and later Pangbourne College, Kilgour joined the Royal Navy in 1968 and had a distinguished career as a submariner. On leaving submarines, he went on to be Commanding Officer of the frigates HMS Norfolk and HMS Montrose – the latter of which came with the post of Captain of the 6th Frigate Squadron. In 1998 he was appointed as Commander Amphibious Task Group, and became Commander Operations. He served as part of the British military intervention in the Sierra Leone Civil War in 2000, for which he was awarded a Queen's Commendation for Valuable Service.

Promoted to rear-admiral in September 2001, Kilgour returned to CINCFLEET at the Northwood Headquarters in northwest London, for the third time as Commander Operations, Flag Officer Submarines (subsequently Rear Admiral Submarines (RASM) in February 2002, the 'tribal chief' of Royal Navy submarines) and as the NATO Submarine Commander responsible for all submarine activity in the Eastern Atlantic and northern waters. Kilgour retired in June 2004.

== Retirement ==
In retirement Kilgour became Chief Executive of The Hurlingham Club, He is President of the Submariners' Association, and Chairman of Trustees, Royal Navy Club.

Military offices
Preceded by Robert Stevens	Commander Operations; 2002–2004	Succeeded by Paul Lambert
