= Peter Walker (RAF officer) =

Royal Air Force officer

Peter Walker CB, CBE
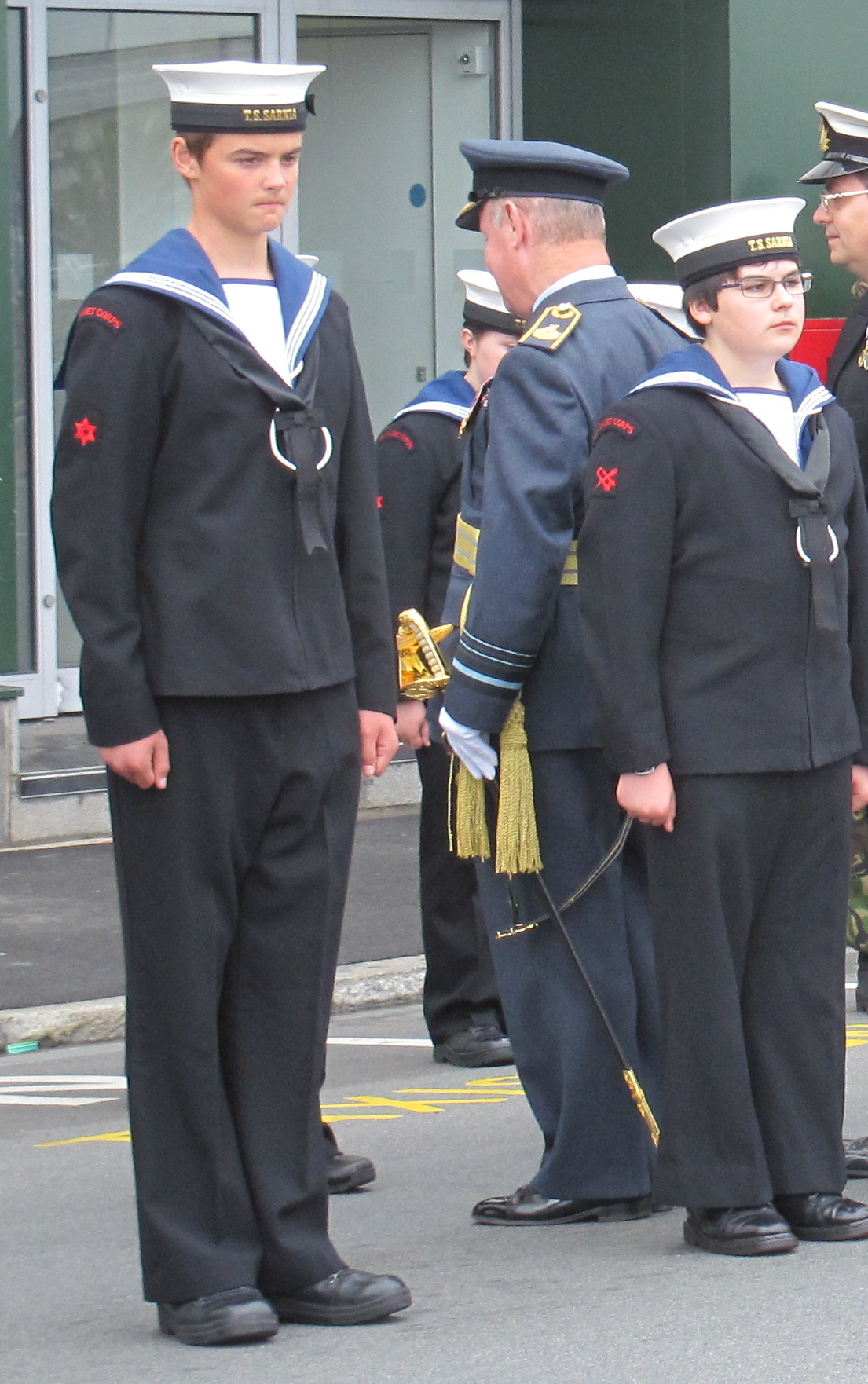
- Peter Walker inspects cadets Saint Peter Port

Lieutenant Governor of Guernsey
- In office 15 April 2011 – 6 September 2015
- Premier: Lyndon Trott; Peter Harwood; Jonathan Le Tocq
- Preceded by: Sir Fabian Malbon
- Succeeded by: Sir Ian Corder

Personal details
- Born: 29 September 1949 Rowley Regis, Staffordshire
- Died: 6 September 2015 (aged 65)
- Spouse: Lynda Walker
- Education: Durham University

Military service
- Allegiance: United Kingdom
- Branch/service: Royal Air Force
- Years of service: 1968–2007
- Rank: Air Marshal
- Commands: Joint Warfare Centre; RAF Mount Pleasant; No. 111 Squadron RAF
- Battles/wars: Iraq War
- Awards: Companion of the Order of the Bath; Commander of the Order of the British Empire; Legion of Merit (United States)

Air Marshal Peter Brett Walker, CB, CBE (29 September 1949 – 6 September 2015) was a Royal Air Force officer who served as Lieutenant Governor of Guernsey from 2011 to 2015.

== Early life ==
The son of a Royal Air Force (RAF) fighter pilot, Peter Brett Walker was born on 29 September 1949 in the Staffordshire village of Rowley Regis. He was initially educated at Pocklington School, before joining Durham University to read for a General Arts degree at Hatfield College. As a student he played rugby for the University 4th XV alongside Richard Paniguian, who would go on to a long career with BP and latterly the Government of the United Kingdom.

== RAF career ==
Walker joined the Royal Air Force as a flight cadet in 1968 while at university and in 1971 entered the Royal Air Force College Cranwell. Selected for training as a fighter-pilot, his first posting was at No. 29 Squadron, based at RAF Coningsby. Here, piloting the McDonnell Douglas F-4 Phantom II, he had regular encounters with Soviet aircraft approaching UK Air Defence. After three years of squadron service, Walker became an instructor on the Phantom operational conversion unit. This was followed by a posting to RAF Germany, where he was weapon's leader of No. 92 Squadron, one of two RAF squadrons responsible for the air policing of Western Germany.

In 1985 he went to RAF Leuchars, where he took command of No. 111 Squadron, also known as the "Tremblers", and flew numerous sorties over the North Sea. In 1993 he went to the Falkland Islands to command RAF Mount Pleasant. He became Director of Operational Capability in 1999, Assistant Chief of Defence Staff (Operations) in 2001, and Assistant Chief of Staff (Policy & Requirements) at SHAPE in 2002. He went on to be Commander of the Joint Warfare Centre in Norway in 2005, and retired in 2007.

In retirement he became Lieutenant Governor of Guernsey, appointed on 15 April 2011. Walker died in that role on 6 September 2015.

== Reputation ==
Walker was described as a 'charismatic fighter pilot' by one former colleague and also said to have a highly aggressive style of flying. He was also known for his ability to mete out discipline, one former flier describing a 'monumental hats-on bollocking in his office' that he and five others received.

== Personal ==
Walker was married to Lynda: they had two sons and a daughter. Before moving to Guernsey the couple lived in North Devon, where they were mentioned in the diaries of socialist politician Tony Benn.

== Death ==
Walker died of a heart attack following a function at the Beau Sejour centre in Guernsey. An air display due to take place was dedicated to his memory, and the Red Arrows made a special fly-past. His funeral was held in London on 22 September at St Clement Danes.

Government offices
Preceded by Sir Fabian Malbon	Lieutenant Governor of Guernsey; 2011–2015	Succeeded by Ian Corder
