= Ian Corder =

Royal Navy officer who served as a NATO Representative (born 1960)

Vice Admiral Sir Ian Corder KBE CB
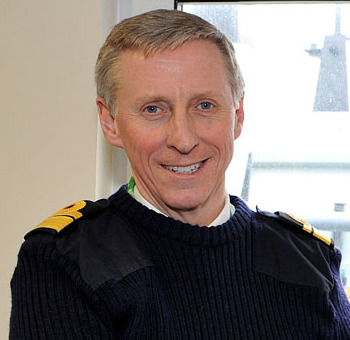
- Corder in 2013

Lieutenant Governor of Guernsey
- In office 14 March 2016 – November 2021
- Premier: Jonathan Le Tocq; Gavin St Pier; Peter Ferbrache
- Preceded by: Peter Walker
- Succeeded by: Richard Cripwell

Personal details
- Born: 6 August 1960 (age 66) Nuneaton, England
- Education: Peterhouse, Cambridge

Military service
- Allegiance: United Kingdom
- Branch/service: Royal Navy
- Years of service: 1978–2016
- Rank: Vice Admiral
- Commands: HMS Cumberland; HMS Splendid; HMS Oracle
- Battles/wars: Operation Ellamy
- Awards: Knight Commander of the Order of the British Empire; Companion of the Order of the Bath

Vice Admiral Sir Ian Fergus Corder, KBE, CB (born 6 August 1960) is a retired senior Royal Navy officer who served as UK Military Representative to NATO, and was the Lieutenant Governor of Guernsey from 2016 to 2021.

== Naval career ==
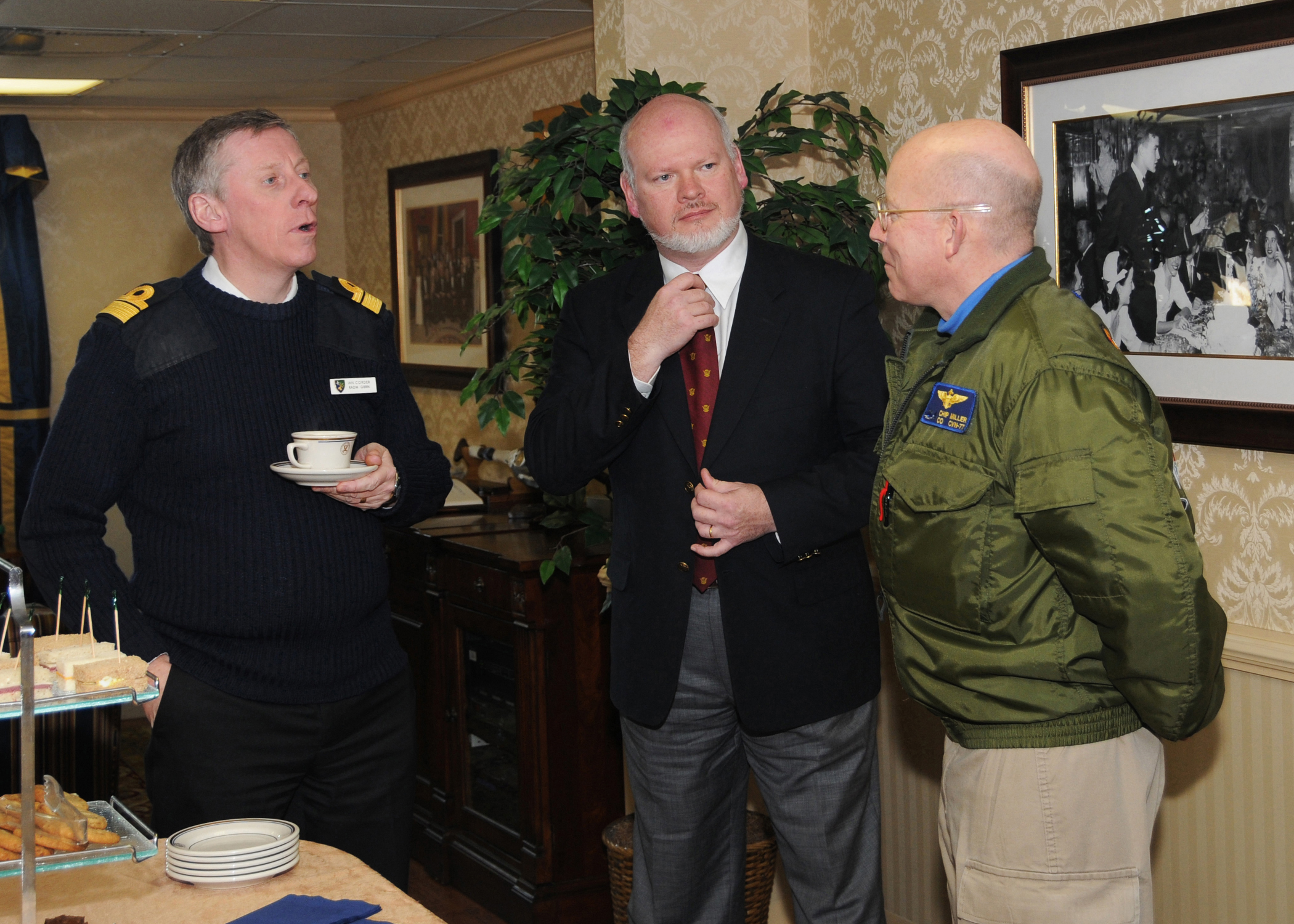
Aboard the USS George H.W. Bush

Educated at Rugby School and Peterhouse, Cambridge, Corder joined the Royal Navy in 1978. He commanded the submarine HMS Oracle, then the submarine HMS Splendid and finally the frigate HMS Cumberland. He went on to become Naval Assistant to the First Sea Lord and then Deputy Director of the unit at the Ministry of Defence responsible for policy regarding NATO, the European Union, and the United Nations. He then became Chief of the Strategic Systems Executive.

After that he became Director of Naval Personnel Strategy and then Deputy Commander Naval Striking and Support Forces NATO before becoming Commander Operations and Rear Admiral, Submarines in March 2011; in that capacity he was the UK's Maritime Commander for operations over Libya (Operation Ellamy) in Spring 2011. He attended the wedding of Prince William and Catherine Middleton in April 2011. He went on to be UK Military Representative to NATO in May 2013.

Corder retired from the Royal Navy on 1 July 2016.

He was elected an Honorary Fellow of Peterhouse, Cambridge in 2016.

== Lieutenant Governor of Guernsey ==
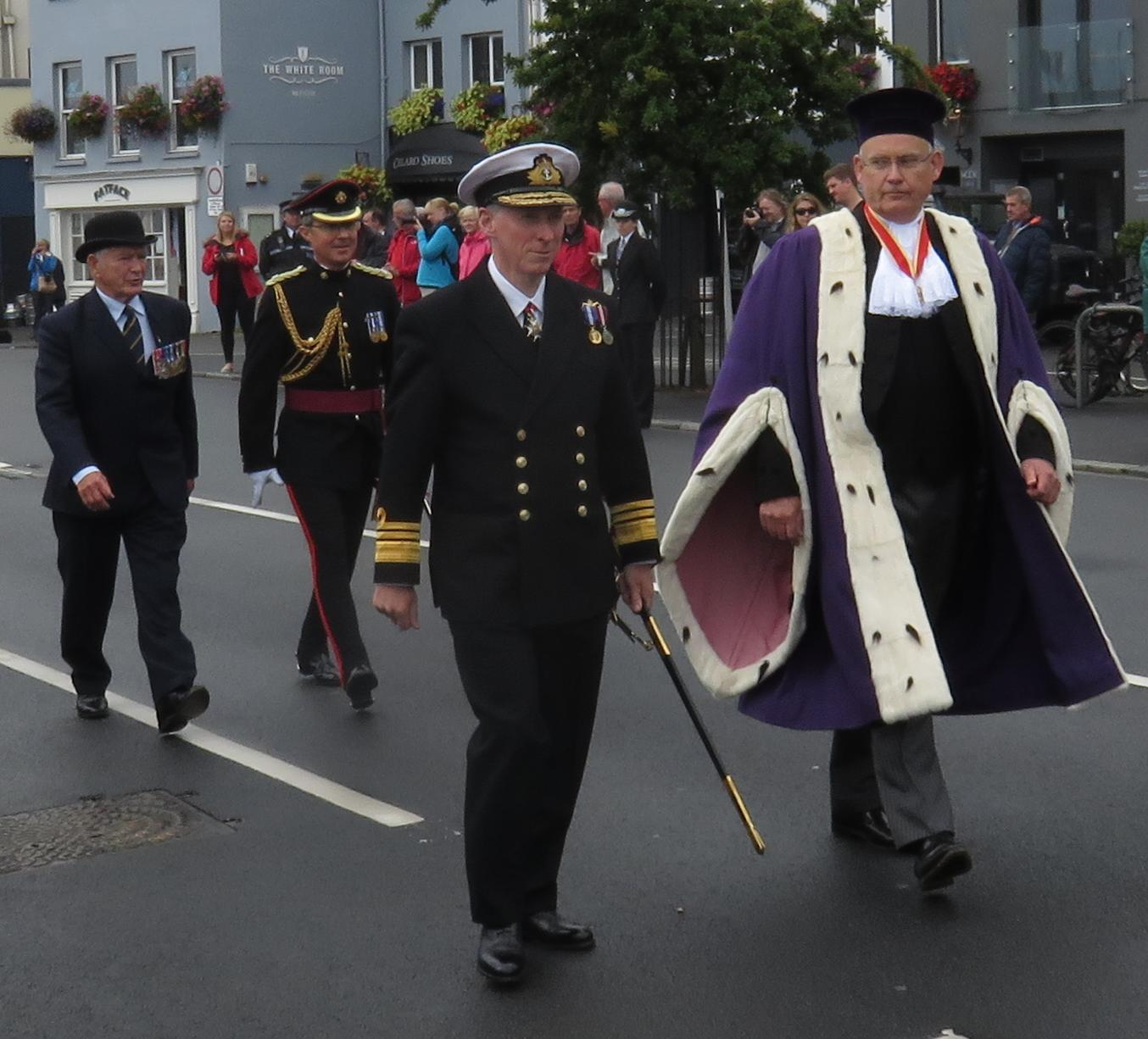
Ian Corder (middle) attending the Queen's birthday parade 2016 in St. Peter Port, Guernsey

In March 2016 Corder was announced as the next Lieutenant Governor of Guernsey, to assume the post by May.

He was appointed a Knight Commander of the Order of the British Empire (KBE) in the 2016 Birthday Honours.

Military offices
Preceded by Mark Anderson	Commander Operations; 2011–2013	Succeeded by Matt Parr
Preceded by Sir Christopher Harper	UK Military Representative to NATO; 2013–2016	Succeeded by Sir George Norton
Government offices
Preceded by Peter Walker	Lieutenant Governor of Guernsey; 2016–2021	Succeeded by Richard Cripwell
