= 6th Frigate Squadron =

- Active: August 1950 – 2002
- Country: United Kingdom
- Branch: Royal Navy
- Size: Squadron

Commanders
- First: Captain Roy S. Foster-Brown
- Last: Captain Matthew J. Parr

The 6th Frigate Squadron was an administrative unit of the Royal Navy from 1950 to 2002.

== History ==
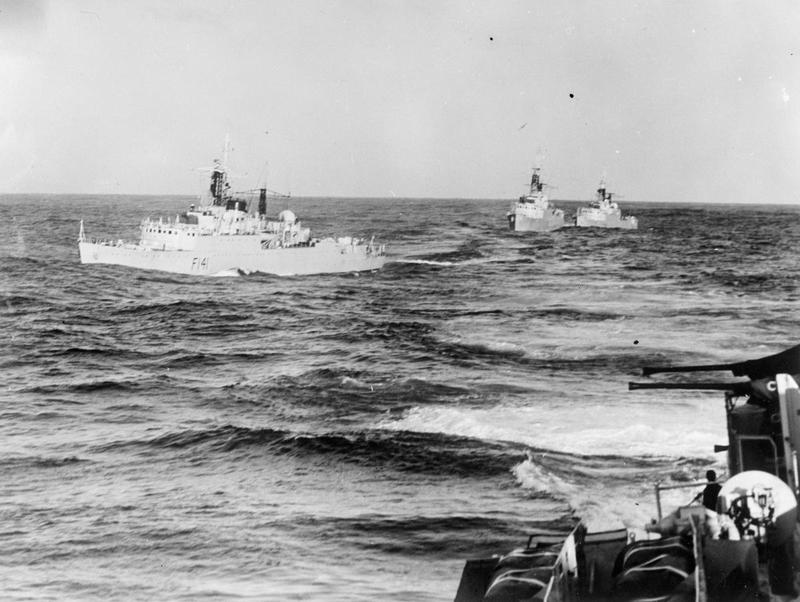
HMS Undine leads ships of the 6th Frigate Squadron in line ahead on their passage to Gibraltar, for spring cruise, 27 January 1957 (IWM A 33691)

During its existence, the squadron included Loch-class, Type 15, Whitby-class, Rothesay-class, Tribal-class, Leander-class and Type 23 frigates.

Ships from the squadron participated in the Coronation Fleet Review, the Beira Patrol, the Cod Wars, the Silver Jubilee Fleet Review, the Falklands War and STANAVFORLANT.

Ships assigned to the squadron bore a badge on their funnels or superstructure depicting the Red Hand of Ulster.

The squadron was active in Singapore from December 1960 to September 1961; September 1962 to January 1963, before being redesignated to the 25th Escort Squadron.

At the Silver Jubilee Fleet Review, 24–29 June 1977, the squadron comprised:

- HMS Andromeda (F57) – Capt K. A. Low, RN (Captain Sixth Frigate Squadron)
- HMS Naiad (F39) – Capt R. C. Dimmock, RN
- HMS Brighton (F106) – Cdr P. Bell, RN
- HMS Charybdis (F75) – Cdr P. J. King, RN

The squadron was disbanded in 2002 for the last time following the Royal Navy's "Fleet First" reorganisation.

== Squadron commander ==
Commander	Ship	Dates
Captain Roy S. Foster-Brown	HMS Loch Insh	August 1950 – 1951
Captain Colin C. Martell	HMS Venus	November 1952 – 1954
Captain Philip F. Powlett	HMS Undine	October 1954-November 1955
Captain John F.D. Bush	HMS Undine	November 1955 – 1956
Captain Raymond Hart	HMS Undine	April 1957–October 1958
Captain Edward B. Ashmore	HMS Blackpool	October 1958–January 1960
Captain Henry R. Hewlett	HMS Yarmouth	January 1960–April 1962
Captain Ian W. Jamieson	HMS Nubian	April 1962 – 1964
Captain Richard D. Franklin	HMS Andromeda	August 1971–December 1972
Captain Alexander F.R. Weir	HMS Andromeda	December 1972–July 1974
Captain Robert W.F. Gerken	HMS Andromeda	July 1974–January 1976
Captain Anthony M.G. Pearson	HMS Andromeda	January 1976–March 1977
Captain Kelvin A. Low	HMS Andromeda/HMS Sirius	March 1977–August 1978
Captain Michael L. E. Tudor-Craig	HMS Sirius	August 1978-November 1979
Captain Thomas G.B. Ram	HMS Sirius	November 1979–April 1981
Captain David Pentreath	HMS Plymouth	April 1981–July 1982
Captain Michael C. Cole	HMS Plymouth	July 1982 – 1984
Captain Peter A. Voute	HMS Ariadne	1984–February 1986
Captain Peter J. Grindal	HMS Ariadne	February 1986-September 1987
Captain John H.S. McAnally	HMS Ariadne/HMS Hermione	September 1987–May 1989
Captain Andrew S. Ritchie	HMS Hermione	May 1989 – 1990
Captain Alexander K. Backus	HMS Hermione	1990–1992
Captain James F. Perowne	HMS Norfolk	March 1993 – 1994
Captain Niall S.R. Kilgour	HMS Norfolk/HMS Montrose	1994–August 1996
Captain Timothy J.H. Laurence	HMS Montrose	August 1996 – 1997
Captain Adrian J. Nance	HMS Montrose	1997–1998
Captain Robert G. Cooling	HMS Montrose	1998–2000
Captain C. Anthony Johnstone-Burt	HMS Montrose	2000–2001
Captain Matthew J. Parr	HMS Montrose	2001–2002

== See also ==
- List of squadrons and flotillas of the Royal Navy
