= Robert Cooling =

Royal Navy Vice Admiral (born 1957)

Vice Admiral Robert Cooling CB
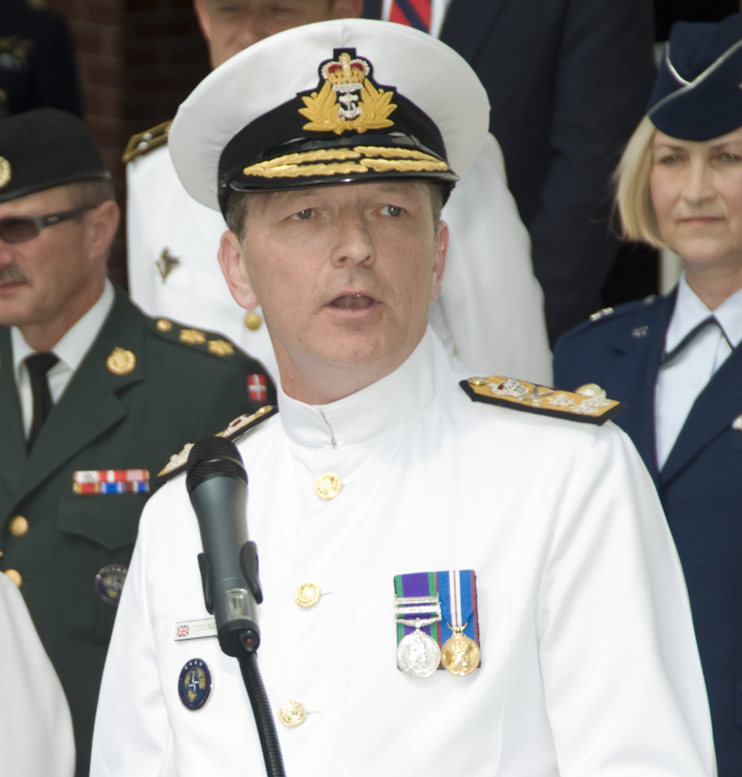
- Vice Admiral Cooling in 2009
- Born: 11 July 1957 (age 69)
- Military career
- Allegiance: United Kingdom
- Branch: Royal Navy
- Service years: 1979–2011
- Rank: Vice Admiral
- Commands: HMS Illustrious; 6th Frigate Squadron; HMS Montrose; HMS Battleaxe; HMS Sandpiper
- Awards: Companion of the Order of the Bath

Vice Admiral Robert George Cooling CB (born 11 July 1957) is a former Royal Navy officer who served as Assistant Chief of the Naval Staff.

== Early life and education ==
Cooling was born on 11 July 1957. He was educated at Christ Church Cathedral School, Oxford and The King's School, Canterbury, both private schools. He studied international relations at Keele University, graduating with a Bachelor of Arts (BA) degree in 1978.

== Naval career ==
Cooling joined the Royal Navy in 1978. He went on to command the patrol craft HMS Sandpiper and then the frigate HMS Battleaxe. He became Commanding Officer of the frigate HMS Montrose as well as Captain of the 6th Frigate Squadron in 1998 and Director of Naval Staff Duties at the Ministry of Defence in 2002. He went on to be Commanding Officer of the aircraft carrier HMS Illustrious in 2004, Deputy Commander of Strike Force (South) in 2006 and Assistant Chief of the Naval Staff in February 2008. Promoted to vice admiral, he became the chief of staff to NATO's Supreme Allied Command Transformation at Norfolk, Virginia in July 2009 before retiring in November 2011.

== Later life ==
Cooling was appointed a Board Member of the Strategy and Integration Advisory Board of Quindell Portfolio plc in March 2012.

Military offices
Preceded by Alan Massey	Assistant Chief of the Naval Staff; 2008–2009	Succeeded by Sir Philip Jones
