= Paul Lambert (Royal Navy officer) =

Royal Navy Vice Admiral (born 1954)

Vice Admiral Sir Paul Lambert KCB
- Born: 17 November 1954 (age 71)
- Military career
- Allegiance: United Kingdom
- Branch: Royal Navy
- Service years: 1974–2012
- Rank: Vice Admiral
- Commands: Commander Operations; HMS Coventry
- Awards: Knight Commander of the Order of the Bath; Knight of the Order of St John

Vice Admiral Sir Paul Lambert, KCB (born 17 November 1954) is a former Royal Navy officer who served as Deputy Chief of the Defence Staff (Equipment Capability) from 2009 to 2012.

== Naval career ==
Educated at Kettering Grammar School and City University London, Lambert joined the Royal Navy in 1974. He was appointed Commanding Officer of the frigate HMS Coventry in 1996. Promoted to rear admiral on 29 June 2004, he was appointed Commander Operations and Rear Admiral, Submarines in 2004. He went on to be Capability Manager (Precision Attack) and Controller of the Navy in 2007, and Deputy Chief of the Defence Staff (Equipment Capability) in 2009. In September 2009, he strongly defended the equipment, including helmet and body armour, being issued to military personnel in Afghanistan. Lambert was advanced to Knight Commander of the Order of the Bath in the 2012 New Year Honours.

== Retirement ==
In retirement, Lambert became Secretary General of the Venerable Order of Saint John. He was appointed Knight of the Order of St John (KStJ) in January 2018.

Military offices
Preceded by Niall Kilgour	Commander Operations; 2004–2006	Succeeded by David Cooke
Preceded by Andrew Mathews	Controller of the Navy; 2007–2009	Succeeded by Amjad Hussain
Preceded by Andrew Figgures	Deputy Chief of the Defence Staff (Equipment Capability); 2009–2012	Succeeded by Stephen Hillier
