= Richard Cripwell =

British Army general (born 1962)

His Excellency Lieutenant General Sir Richard Cripwell KBE CB CStJ
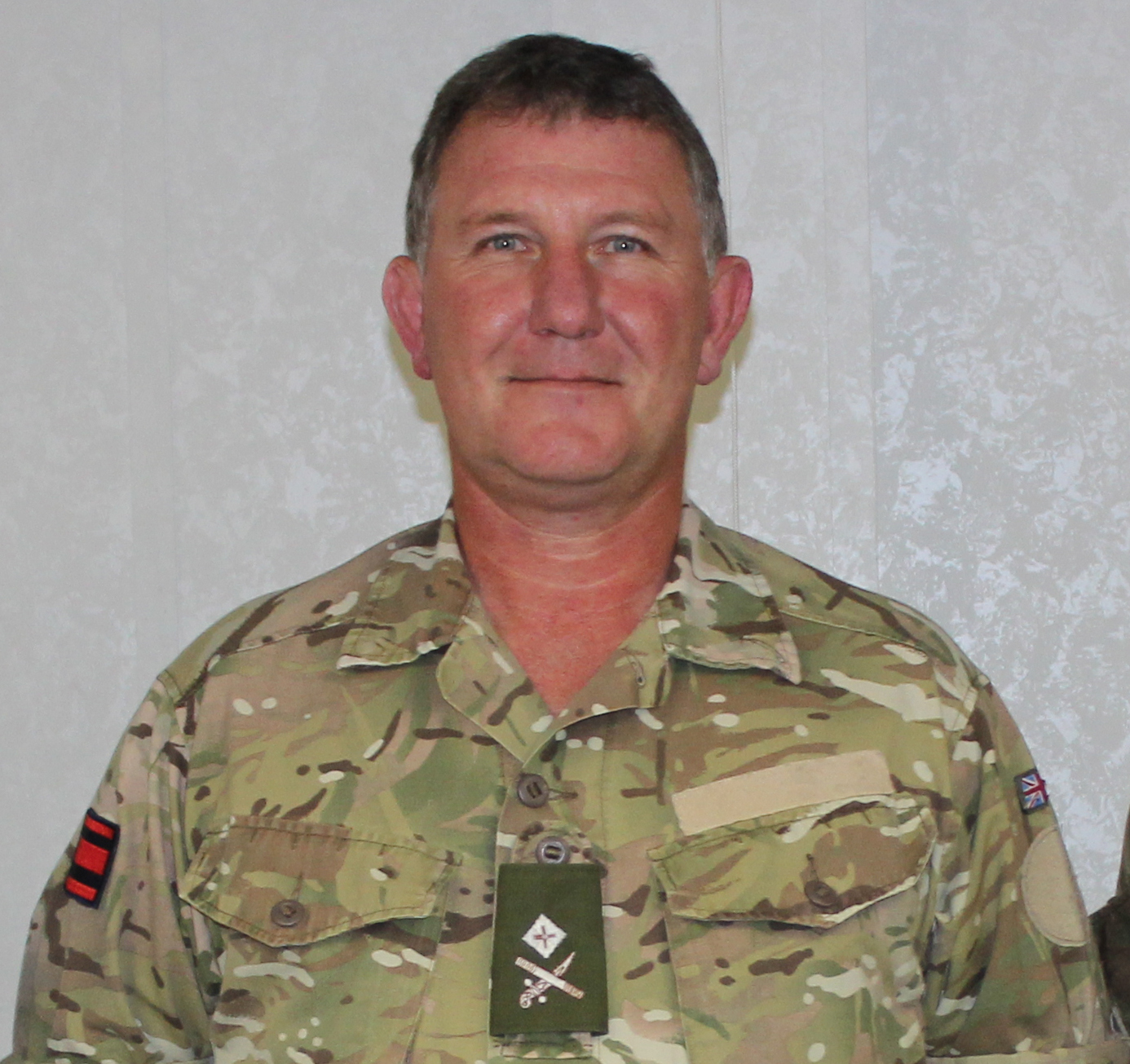

Lieutenant Governor of Guernsey
- Incumbent
- Assumed office 15 February 2022
- Premier: Lyndon Trott; Peter Ferbrache
- Preceded by: Sir Ian Corder

Personal details
- Born: 1962 (age 63–64) Newry, Northern Ireland

Military service
- Allegiance: United Kingdom
- Branch/service: British Army
- Years of service: 1982–2022
- Rank: Lieutenant General
- Unit: Royal Engineers
- Commands: British Forces Cyprus; Intelligence, Surveillance and Reconnaissance Task Force in Kosovo; 26 Engineer Regiment
- Battles/wars: The Troubles; Iraqi no-fly zones conflict Iraq War; War in Afghanistan
- Awards: Knight Commander of the Order of the British Empire; Companion of the Order of the Bath; Commander of the Order of St John; Queen's Commendation for Valuable Service; Officer of the Legion of Merit (United States); Bronze Star Medal (United States)

Lieutenant General Sir Richard John Cripwell (born 1962) is a former senior British Army officer. He serves as the Lieutenant Governor of Guernsey since 2022.

== Early life and education ==
Born in 1962 in Newry, Northern Ireland, Cripwell was educated in Dublin, Ireland, and at Welbeck College.

== Military career ==
Cripwell was commissioned into the Royal Engineers in 1982. He was awarded a Queen's Commendation for Valuable Service in recognition of "distinguished services... in support of Air Operations over Iraq" in 1998, became commanding officer of 26 Engineer Regiment, and was then appointed commander of the Intelligence, Surveillance and Reconnaissance Task Force in Kosovo. He went on to be Assistant Chief of Staff at Permanent Joint Headquarters in January 2010, Director Strategic Transition and Assessments Group at the Headquarters of the International Security Assistance Force in February 2012 and Commander British Forces Cyprus and Administrator of the Sovereign Base Areas in January 2013. After that he became Head of the British Defence Staff and Defence Attaché in Washington, D.C. in March 2015. Cripwell was appointed a Companion of the Order of the Bath in the 2017 New Year Honours, and in October he became the Deputy Commander of NATO's Resolute Support Mission. Cripwell assumed the appointment of Deputy Commander NATO Allied Land Command on 22 February 2019.

On 8 September 2021, it was announced that Cripwell had been appointed as the new Lieutenant Governor of Guernsey. He was sworn in on 15 February 2022, and retired from the British Army on 29 April.

He served as Colonel commandant of the Royal Engineers until 1 May 2024.

Cripwell was advanced to Knight Commander of the Order of the British Empire in the 2025 Birthday Honours.

Military offices
Preceded by Sir Graham Stacey	Commander British Forces Cyprus; 2013–2015	Succeeded by Sir Michael Wigston
Preceded by Buster Howes	Head of the British Defence Staff – US and Defence Attaché; 2015–2017	Succeeded by Gavin Parker
Government offices
Preceded by Sir Ian Corder	Lieutenant Governor of Guernsey; 2022–present	Incumbent
