= HMS Montrose (F236) =

Former Type 23 frigate of the Royal Navy

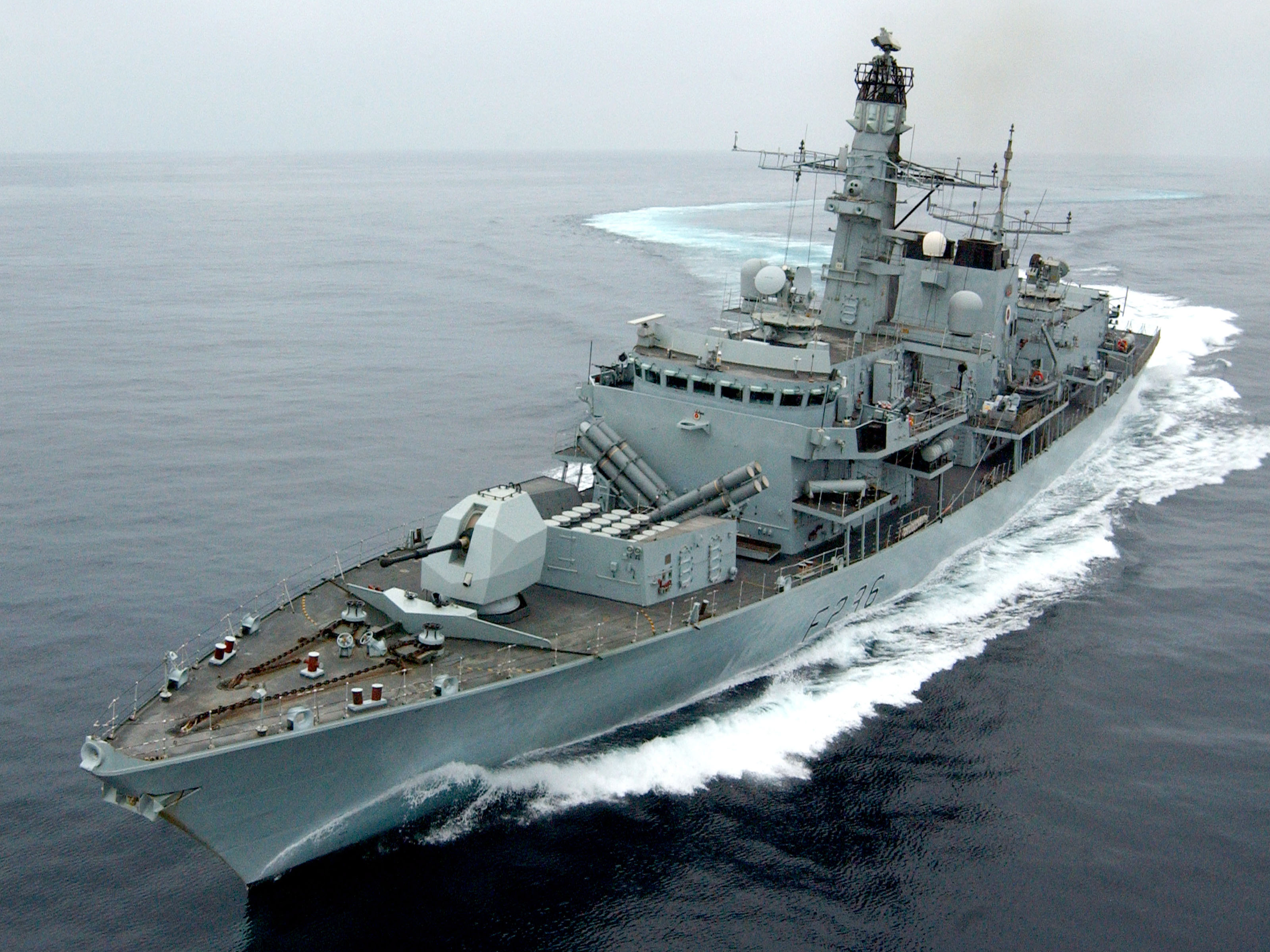
- HMS Montrose in 2005

History

United Kingdom
- Name: Montrose
- Ordered: July 1988
- Builder: Yarrow Shipbuilders
- Laid down: 1 November 1989
- Launched: 31 July 1992
- Sponsored by: Lady Rifkind
- Commissioned: 2 June 1994
- Decommissioned: 17 April 2023
- Refit: LIFEX 2014–2017
- Home port: HMNB Portsmouth
- Identification: IMO number: 8949642; MMSI number: 234618000; Callsign: GCOD
- Motto: Mare ditat rosa decorat; Latin: "The sea enriches and the rose adorns"
- Fate: Scrapped 2026
- Badge

General characteristics
- Class & type: Type 23 frigate
- Displacement: 4,900 t (4,800 long tons)
- Length: 133 m (436 ft 4 in)
- Beam: 16.1 m (52 ft 10 in)
- Height: 28.6 m (93 ft 10 in)
- Draught: 7.3 m (23 ft 11 in)
- Propulsion: CODLAG: Four 1,510 kW (2,020 shp) Paxman Valenta 12CM diesel generators; Two GEC electric motors delivering 2,980 kW (4,000 shp); Two Rolls-Royce Spey SM1C delivering 23,190 kW (31,100 shp)
- Speed: In excess of 28 knots (52 km/h; 32 mph)
- Range: 7,500 nmi (14,000 km; 9,000 mi) at 15 kn (28 km/h; 17 mph)
- Complement: 185 (accommodation for up to 205)
- Electronic warfare & decoys: UAT Mod 1 ESM; Seagnat; Type 2170 Surface Ship Torpedo Defence
- Armament: Anti-air missiles: 1 × 32-cell GWS 35 Vertical Launching System (VLS) for: 32 × Sea Ceptor missiles (1–25+ km); Anti-ship missiles: 2 × quad Harpoon launchers (8 × missiles); Anti-submarine torpedoes: 2 × twin 12.75 in (324 mm) Sting Ray torpedo tubes; Guns: 1 × BAE 4.5-inch Mk 8 naval gun; 2 × 30 mm DS30M Mk2 guns, or, 2 × 30 mm DS30B guns; 2 × Miniguns; 4 × General-purpose machine gun
- Aircraft carried: 1 × Westland Wildcat HMA2, armed with; 2 × anti-submarine torpedoes; or; 1 × Westland Merlin HM2, armed with; 4 × anti-submarine torpedoes
- Aviation facilities: Flight deck; Enclosed hangar

HMS Montrose was the eighth of the sixteen-ship Type 23 or Duke class of frigates, of the Royal Navy, named after the Duke of Montrose. She was laid down in November 1989 by Yarrow Shipbuilders on the Clyde, and was launched on 31 July 1992 by Edith Rifkind (later Lady Rifkind), wife of (later Sir) Malcolm Rifkind, Secretary of State for Defence. She was commissioned into service in June 1994.

Having once been the flagship of the 6th Frigate Squadron, Montrose became part of the Devonport Flotilla, based in Devonport Dockyard in Plymouth. In 2018, it was announced that Montrose would become the first Royal Navy frigate to be forward-deployed to the UK Naval Support Facility in Bahrain. The 2021 defence review announced that the ship would be retired early, likely after her return to the U.K. from the Persian Gulf. She was deployed on maritime security operations in the Persian Gulf up to November 2022. On 5 January 2022 the frigate passed the 1,000-day milestone of days at sea and in November of that year departed the Persian Gulf to return to the U.K. ahead of her decommissioning. She was subsequently decommissioned on 17 April 2023.

== Operational history ==
=== 1994–2000 ===
Deployments in the 1990s include her first trip to the South Atlantic, as Falkland Islands guardship, which ended in October 1996. Her first visit to the City of Dundee was in 1993. Several NATO deployments followed.

=== 2001–2010 ===
In early 2002, Montrose returned to the Falklands on the now-renamed Atlantic Patrol Task (South) deployment, during which divers from Montrose replaced the White Ensign on Antelope, which was sunk during the Falklands War. On her return from this deployment, she conducted her first refit period (RP1), which was completed in early January 2004.

In October 2004, Montrose was one of a number of ships dispatched to the rescue of the stricken Canadian submarine Chicoutimi (an ex-Royal Navy Upholder-class submarine) which had suffered a number of fires on board, causing casualties and the loss of power in the submarine. Montrose was the first Royal Navy vessel to make contact with the boat and assisted the submarine.

Montrose deployed in 2006 to the Persian Gulf on Operation Telic in the first half of 2006. After returning to the UK for personnel changes and maintenance, from 8 January to 27 July 2007, Montrose then deployed for seven months to the Mediterranean Sea as the UK contribution to the Standing NATO Maritime Group Two (SNMG2). As part of this group, she participated in NATO's Operation Active Endeavour (OAE), countering terrorist activity in the Mediterranean and preventing smuggling and other illegal activity. After Summer Leave, the ship headed to Scotland to take part in Exercise Neptune Warrior, and was visited there by Prince Michael of Kent, Honorary Rear Admiral of the Royal Naval Reserve, on 24 September 2007.

Following Operational Sea Training, Montrose deployed again to the Middle East on 12 March 2008 to join Combined Task Force (CTF) 150, operating in the Gulf of Aden and the Arabian Sea. Activity in this deployment included Exercise Khunjar Haad, a multi-national exercise held in the Gulf of Oman in May, and working with Chatham, Edinburgh and RFA Argus the seizure of over 23 tonnes of illegal drugs including cocaine, hashish, amphetamines and opiates. She returned home on 3 October 2008, and after operating in UK waters, commenced a £15,000,000 upkeep package at Rosyth in early 2009.

This second refit package (RP2) included a number of major capability upgrades for the ship, including the first fitting of the Royal Navy's newest command system, DNA(2), and the replacement of the two old manually operated 30 mm guns with two 30 mm DS30M Mark 2 Guns. Having rejoined the ship on 20 July 2009, the crew conducted post-refits trials until January 2010, and Montrose was formally accepted back into the fleet on 11 February 2010.

After operational sea training Montrose deployed to the Arabian Sea in Summer 2010 to conduct anti-piracy operations, highlights of which included the November 2010 destruction of a Somalian pirate ship by the ship's Lynx helicopter while on patrol off the coast of Somalia, and the disruption of several pirate attacks on merchant ships.

=== 2011–2023 ===
In October 2011, Montrose deployed again to the South Atlantic, during which she was due to visit Callao, Peru in March 2012, but the Peruvian government cancelled the visit, according to the Foreign Minister, as a gesture of solidarity with Argentina over the Falklands. After visits to New Orleans and Bermuda in March and April 2012, Montrose returned to the UK in May 2012. In July 2012, the ship acted as the escort vessel for Queen Elizabeth II during her Diamond Jubilee visit to Cowes.

From September to November 2012, the ship participated in the COUGAR 12 deployment to the Mediterranean. In early 2013, the ship and crew underwent intensive training to return to the front line, and then deployed as part of the COUGAR 13 task group in August 2013. After the remainder of the COUGAR 13 task group returned to the UK, Montrose remained in the Middle East to act as the UK's frigate in the Persian Gulf under Operation KIPION, and conducted numerous exercises with allied nations, as well as UK-only training events such as the maintenance exercise with RFA Diligence.

In 2014, Montrose was tasked to join Norwegian and Danish warships in Operation RECSYR – the mission to escort the merchant vessels removing the Syrian chemical weapons stockpile for destruction. Having handed over to HMS Diamond, the ship arrived home in March 2014. Subsequently, and after a high-profile London visit to celebrate 20 years since the ship's commissioning, the ship was sent to the Baltic Sea to participate in BALTOPS 14, a large scale US-led multinational exercise with participation from 30 ships and submarines from 14 nations.

The ship entered refit at Devonport in October 2014, was due to rejoin the Fleet in 2016, but the incomplete installation of the Sea Ceptor Missile system and a new command system prevented it. Ship's staff moved back on board in March 2017 to prepare for sea trials and it was announced that Montrose would escort HMS Queen Elizabeth on her deployment to the United States for first of class flying trials in 2018. Montrose returned to sea for the first time in nearly three years on 7 July 2017 to commence a period of trials and testing before undergoing operational sea training later in the year. Despite the announcement in 2017, Montrose did not accompany Queen Elizabeth on her 2018 deployment; escort duties instead fell to sister HMS Monmouth. Montrose instead began working up for a major three-year deployment, which would see the ship become the first frigate to be based at the Royal Navy's new support facility in Bahrain, HMS Juffair.

In mid 2018 Montrose acted as the Fleet Readiness Escort (FRE) in the North Sea and Dover Straits, escorting Russian units as they passed through these areas. This was followed by a mini-deployment to the Baltic where she exercised with the Swedish and Finnish navies and to strengthen ties with these nations with a focus around the celebrations of the 200th anniversary of the formation of the Finnish Navy. On return to the UK, Montrose went through a period of operational sea training before deploying to the South Pacific and Far East to carry out MarSy Operations in conjunction with JIATF(S) and Freedom of Navigation Operations (FONOPS). During this time she visited Chile, Easter Island, Pitcairn Island, Tahiti, Auckland, Darwin, Singapore and Tokyo.

During a meeting with Japanese Prime Minister Shinzō Abe on 10 January 2019, it was announced that HMS Montrose would be deployed to the Pacific region to enforce sanctions against North Korea.

Montrose forward-deployed to Bahrain in April 2019, where she was to remain until 2022 carrying out an array of joint security operations including counter-piracy, counter-narcotics and boarding operations to support allies in the region and to protect the UK's interests. In early July 2019, amid rising tensions between the United Kingdom and Iran, Montrose issued radio warnings to boats believed to belong to the Islamic Revolutionary Guard Corps Navy which were attempting to impede the passage of the British commercial vessel British Heritage. US officials stated that five Iranian boats were involved, while some UK sources say only three were involved. The incident occurred in the Strait of Hormuz. According to some tabloid sources, Montrose had her 30 mm deck guns trained on the Iranian boats. On 19 July Montrose warned the Islamic Revolutionary Guard by radio against the seizure of the British-flagged Stena Impero but was not close enough to prevent the seizure. From July 28, Montrose was joined by HMS Duncan, which had been ordered to the Persian Gulf on 12 July 2019 in response to threats against British shipping by Iran. Duncan had originally been intended to arrive later to fill in for Montrose during the latter's scheduled maintenance, but upon arrival was planned to serve alongside Montrose until the latter's maintenance date in late August. In September 2019, Stena Impero was released and HMS Duncan returned to Portsmouth. On 12 October it was reported that Montrose along with her French counterpart, Jean Bart, were able to capture 170 kilograms (370 lb) of illegal drugs. These drugs had an estimated worth of $1 million. The ships were able to catch the drug-smuggling dhow while operating in the Arabian Sea.

On 22 March 2021, it was announced that Montrose as well as sister ship Monmouth would be decommissioned earlier than planned as part of defence's Integrated Review. As of 2021, Montrose remained deployed east of Suez but was scheduled to return to the UK in 2022 following which she was retired, about 4-5 years earlier than previously planned.

On 23 January 2022, the Royal Navy seized 663 kg (1,462 lb) of heroin, 87 kg (192 lb) of methamphetamine, 291 kg (642 lb) of hashish, and marijuana during a raid from Montrose, reportedly worth 15 million British pounds ($20 million).

As of June 2022, the out of service date for Montrose was brought forward to early 2023. On 4 November 2022 Montrose left United Kingdom Naval Support Facility where she was permanently based since April 2019. She arrived back in U.K. waters in mid-December 2022 and was decommissioned on 17 April 2023.

In 2022, Montrose spent 212 days at sea.

Montrose was decommissioned on 17 April 2023.

=== Final fate ===
As of 2024 HMS Montrose failed to attract any bids when being auctioned off for scrapping, and the final fate of the ship was thus uncertain. She remained at Portsmouth Naval Base.

On 15 July 2026, she left Portsmouth for the final time under tow, having been sold for scrap.

== Visits to Dundee and Montrose ==
Montrose has visited Dundee on many occasions, include Easter 1997, 6–9 November 1998 (Dundee Navy Days), 9 October 2004 (for wreath-laying ceremony commemorating the 200th anniversary of the death of Admiral Adam Duncan), 4 June 2005, and 9–13 November 2006 (covering the Remembrance Sunday memorial service).

The port of Montrose is smaller than Dundee, but Montrose has called in six times. The first visit took place in November 1999, followed by five other visits, one in July 2002, when the ship was granted the Freedom of Angus by the Provost Mrs Frances Duncan, and marched through the town, and six years later in November 2008, when Angus Provost Ruth Melville took the salute during a Remembrance Sunday parade in which this Freedom was exercised. The ship returned to Montrose in July 2014, where they exercised the Freedom of Angus in front of Provost Helen Oswald, and conducted numerous engagements in the local area. The ship visited for a fifth time in July 2018, welcoming members of the public on board for a brief tour of the deck. The last visit took place in March 2023 just before her decommissioning. Montrose was decommissioned on 17 April 2023.

== Commanding officers ==
As the flagship of the 6th Frigate Squadron (or F6), many of the first commanding officers of HMS Montrose were captains, rather than commanders, as they had administrative responsibility over all the Type 23 frigates based in Devonport. The equivalent squadron for the Portsmouth-based Type 23s was the 4th Frigate Squadron. With the abolition of the frigate and destroyer squadrons in 2002/3, and their replacement by flotillas, command of Montrose reverted to that of a Commander.

Of this list, three commanding officers were subsequently promoted to vice admiral, including the husband of the Princess Royal, Timothy Laurence, who assumed command of the ship (and the 6th Frigate Squadron) on 27 August 1996.

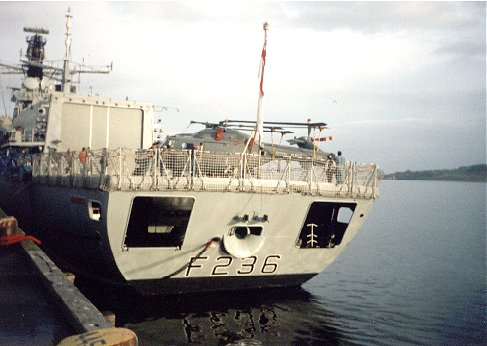
Montrose in Dundee Docks, 1998

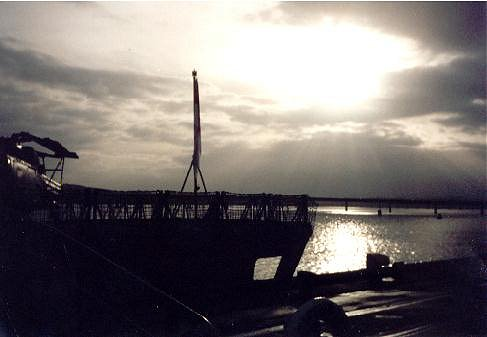
Montrose at dusk in Dundee Docks, 1998

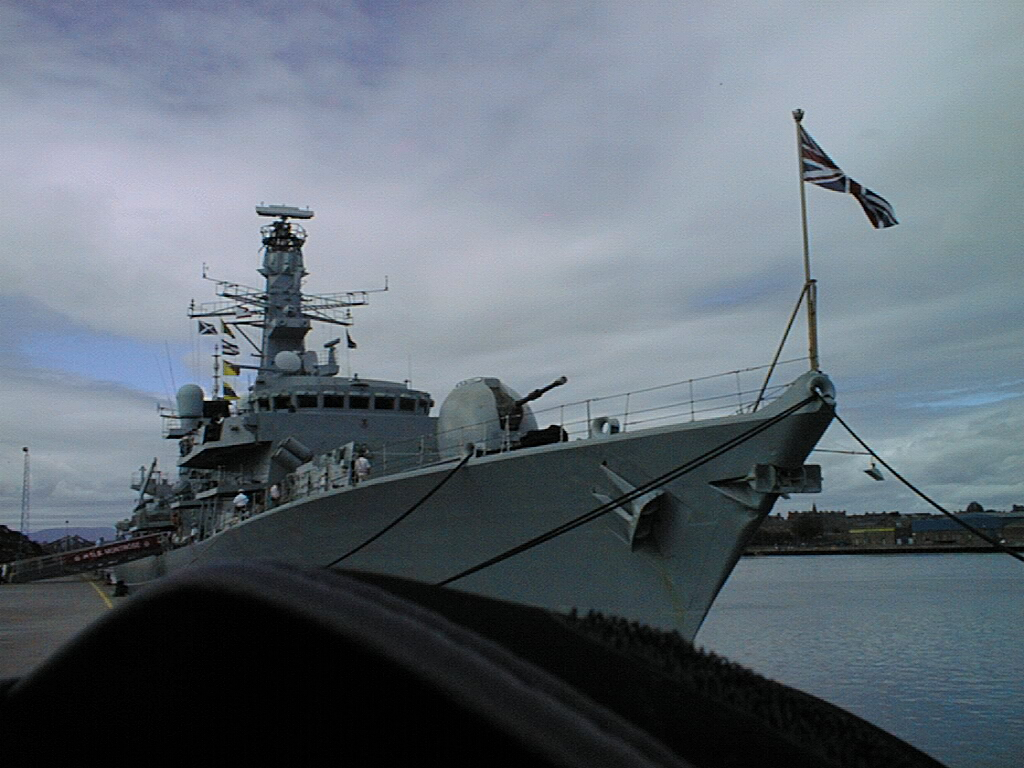
HMS Montrose in Montrose, Scotland

Name	Date
Cdr J W Arrow	1993–95
Capt N S R Kilgour	1995–96
Capt T J H Laurence MVO	1996–97
Capt A R Nance OBE	1997–98
Capt R G Cooling	1998–2000
Capt C A Johnstone-Burt OBE	2000–01
Capt M J Parr	2001–02
Cdr A J Webb	2003–05
Cdr A J L Watt OBE	2005–07
Cdr A L Hogben	2007–08
Cdr J M Lowther	2009
Cdr W J Warrender	2009
Cdr J D Lett	2009–12
Cdr J M B Parkin	2012–14
Cdr C M O'Neill	2017–2019
Cdr W King (Stbd Crew)	2019–2019
Cdr O Hucker (Port Crew)	2019–2021
Cdr C Collins (Stbd Crew)	2019–2021
Cdr P Irving (Port Crew)	2021-2022
Cdr C Thompson (Stbd Crew)	2021-2023

(decorations and ranks detailed at the time of being in Command, and do not reflect subsequent promotions, or honours and awards)

Ten of the former Commanding Officers were reunited on board Montrose on 30 May 2014 at a lunch held to celebrate the 20th anniversary of the ship's commissioning, when they were invited on board while the ship was in London; the ship's sponsor, Lady Rifkind, also attended.

== Decorations ==
At the end of 2014, HMS Montrose was awarded the Fleet Effectiveness Trophy for best frigate in the Royal Navy in 2014.

== Affiliations ==
- 29 Commando Regiment, Royal Artillery
- Angus District Council
- James Graham, 8th Duke of Montrose
- No. 24 Squadron RAF
- Black Watch, 3rd Battalion Royal Regiment of Scotland
- Worshipful Company of Distillers
- Oxford University Royal Naval Unit
