= Trafalgar-class submarine =

1983 class of British attack submarines

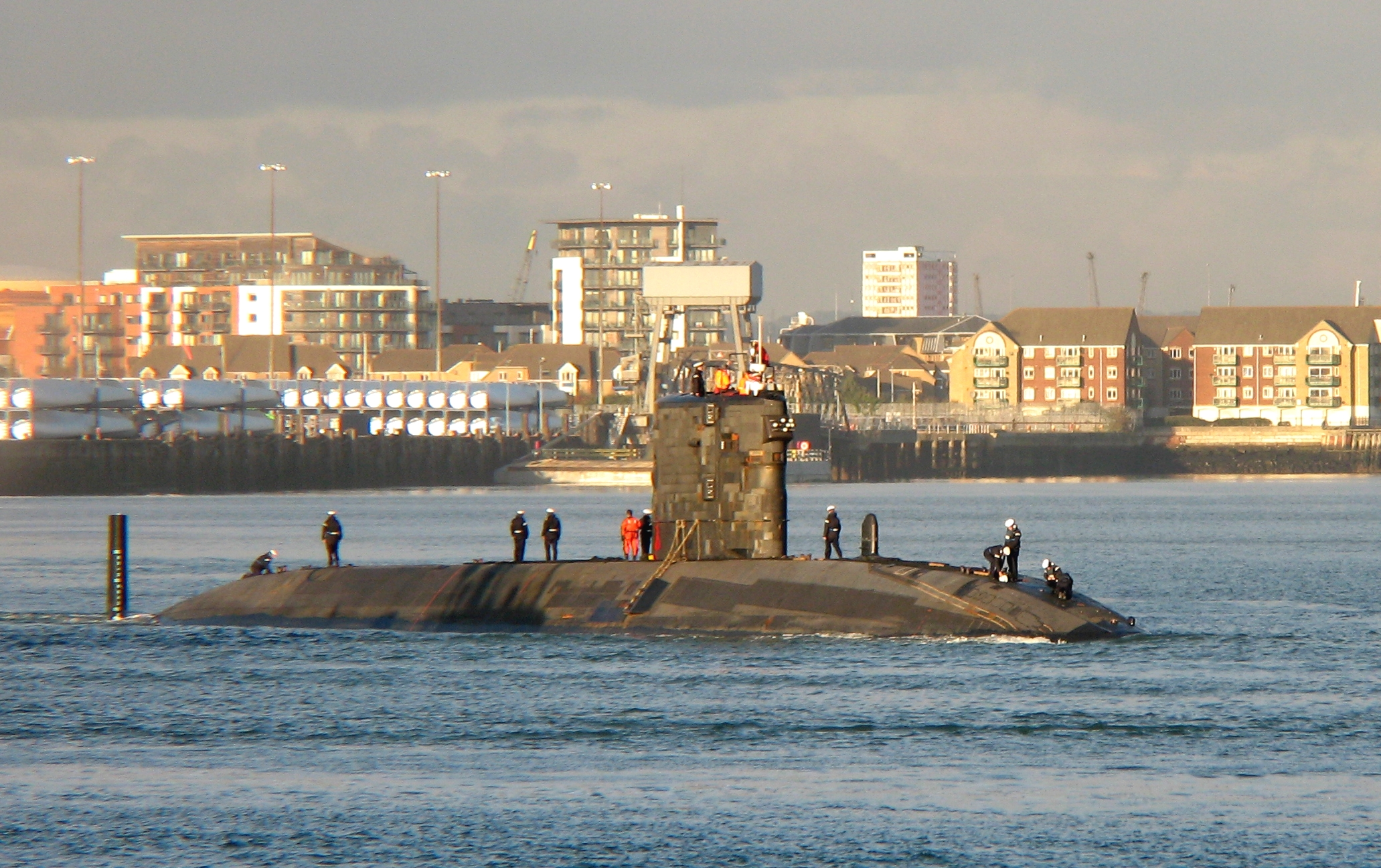
- HMS Trafalgar in 2008

Class overview
- Builders: Vickers Shipbuilding and Engineering, Barrow-in-Furness
- Operators: Royal Navy
- Preceded by: Swiftsure class
- Succeeded by: Astute class
- Cost: £200 million (1986) (equivalent to £611 million in 2024) per unit
- Built: 1977–1991
- In service: 1983–2025
- Completed: 7
- Retired: 7

General characteristics
- Type: Nuclear-powered fleet submarines
- Displacement: Surfaced: 4,500 to 4,800 t (4,400 to 4,700 long tons); Submerged: 5,200 to 5,300 t (5,100 to 5,200 long tons)
- Length: 85.4 m (280 ft 2 in)
- Beam: 9.8 m (32 ft 2 in)
- Draught: 9.5 m (31 ft 2 in)
- Propulsion: 1 × Rolls-Royce PWR1 nuclear reactor; 2 × GEC steam turbines; 2 × WH Allen turbo generators; 3.2 MW; 2 × Paxman diesel generators 2,800 shp (2.1 MW); 1 × pump jet propulsor (Note: All boats have a pump jet propulsor with the exception of Trafalgar, which was fitted with a 7-bladed conventional propeller.); 1 × motor for emergency drive; 1 × auxiliary retractable prop
- Speed: Over 30 knots (56 km/h; 35 mph), submerged
- Range: Unlimited
- Test depth: 600 m (2,000 ft)
- Complement: 130
- Electronic warfare & decoys: 2 × SSE Mk8 launchers for Type 2066 and Type 2071 torpedo decoys; RESM Racal UAP passive intercept; CESM Outfit CXA; SAWCS decoys carried from 2002
- Armament: 5 × 21 in (533 mm) torpedo tubes with stowage for up to 30 weapons: Tomahawk Block IV cruise missiles; Spearfish heavyweight torpedoes

The Trafalgar class was a class of nuclear-powered fleet submarines (SSNs) that was in service with the Royal Navy, and the successor to the Swiftsure class. Like the majority of Royal Navy nuclear submarines, all seven boats were constructed at Barrow-in-Furness shipyard, Cumbria. The class made up part of the Royal Navy's nuclear-powered 'hunter-killer' submarine force. The Trafalgar class was replaced by the larger and more capable Astute class, of which five are in service. The name Trafalgar refers to the Battle of Trafalgar fought between the Royal Navy and the combined fleets of France and Spain in 1805.

== Development ==
The Trafalgar class were designed in the early 1970s during the Cold War as a refinement of the preceding Swiftsure class. Louis Rydill, RCNC was the designer of the 1974 Naval Staff Requirement which focused on creating a class quieter than the Swiftsure class, under ADNC Keith Foulger, RCNC.

Including HMS Dreadnought, the Trafalgar class are the fifth class of nuclear-powered fleet submarines to enter service with the Royal Navy. The lead boat of the class, HMS Trafalgar, was ordered on 7 April 1977 and completed in 1983. The last, HMS Triumph, was ordered on 3 January 1986 and completed in 1991. All seven boats of the class were built and completed by Vickers Shipbuilding and Engineering at the Barrow-in-Furness shipyard.

In 1982, Jane's Fighting Ships recorded: "Estimated cost of fourth submarine £175 million including equipment and weapon system when fitted." In 1986, Jane's Fighting Ships recorded that the average cost for this class was £200 million at 1984–85 prices.

== Characteristics ==
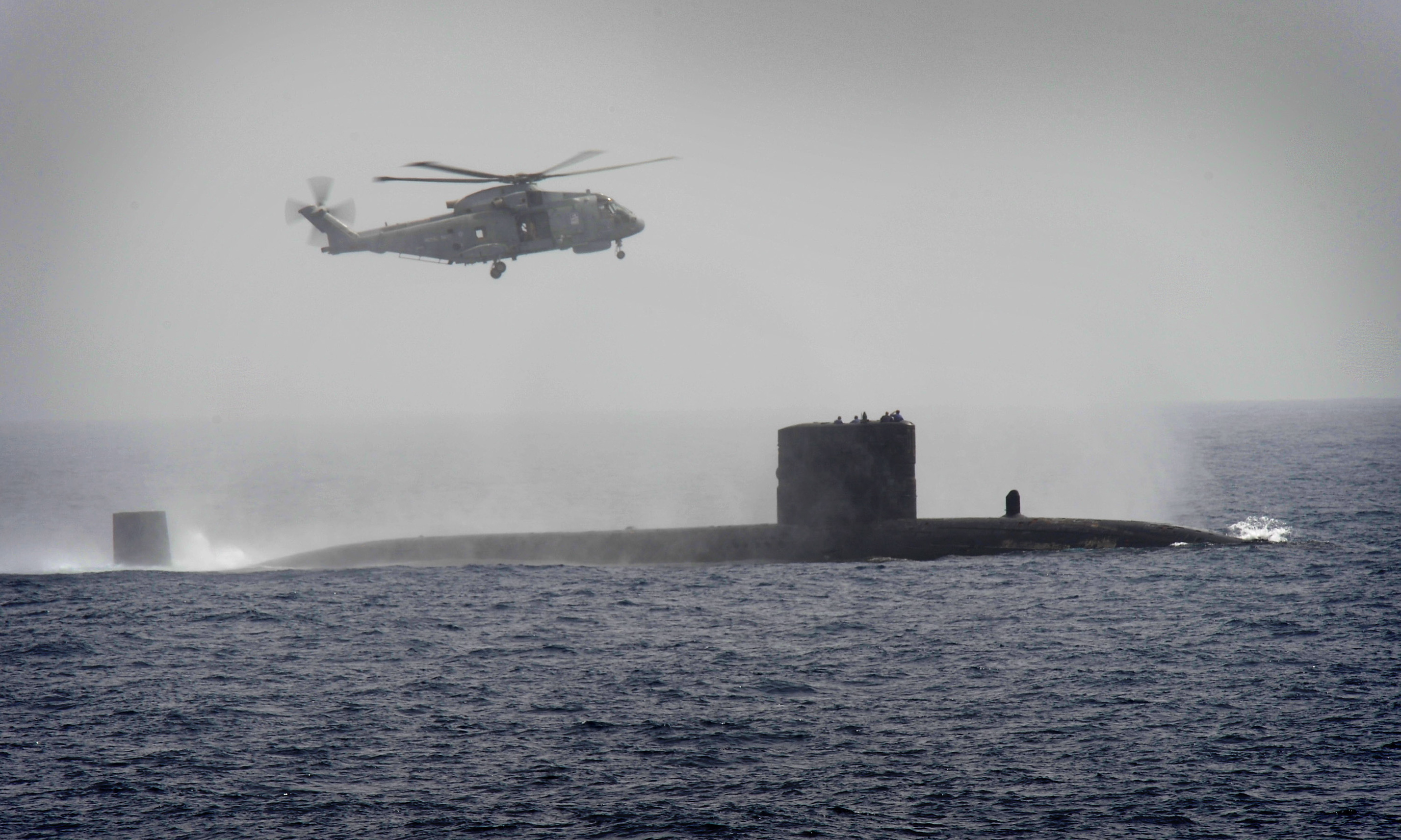
Turbulent with a Merlin helicopter from Type 23 frigate HMS St Albans, during an anti-submarine exercise in the Gulf of Oman, 2011.

As a refinement of the preceding Swiftsure class, the design of the Trafalgar class bore some similarity, including its internal layout and the Rolls-Royce PWR1 Core 3. However some improvements over the Swiftsure class included its reduced acoustic signature, which was due to the hull being covered in anechoic tiles which were designed to absorb sound rather than reflect it, making the boats quieter and more difficult to detect with active sonar. A pumpjet propulsion system was also used from the second vessel onward, rather than a conventional propeller. The Trafalgar class were 85.4 m (280 ft 2 in) long, have a beam of 9.8 m (32 ft 2 in), a draught of 9.5 m (31 ft 2 in) and a dived displacement of 5,300 tonnes (5,200 long tons). Each boat had a complement of 130. Like all Royal Navy submarines, the Trafalgar class had strengthened fins and retractable hydroplanes, allowing them to surface through thick ice.

Four boats of the class — Torbay, Trenchant, Talent and Triumph — were fitted with the Sonar 2076 system. Beginning in 2014, the last four boats of the class underwent a communications package upgrade.

The Trafalgar class was equipped with five 21-inch (533 mm) torpedo tubes with accommodation for a mixture of up to 30 weapons:

- Tomahawk Block IV cruise missiles
- Spearfish heavyweight torpedoes

The Tomahawk missiles are capable of hitting a target to within a few metres, to a range of 1,000 miles (1,600 km).

Ostensibly, the submarines used the same steering column as was used in the Wellington bombers of the Second World War.

== Boats of the class ==
Initially, the last five boats of the Trafalgar class were to be replaced by the 'Future Fleet Submarine' programme, however, this was effectively cancelled in 2001. The Astute class are replacing the Trafalgar class.

| Name | Pennant No. | Builder | Laid down | Launched | Commissioned | Decommissioned | Status |
|---|---|---|---|---|---|---|---|
| Trafalgar | S107 | Vickers Shipbuilding and Engineering, Barrow-in-Furness | 25 April 1979 | 1 July 1981 | 27 May 1983 | 4 December 2009 | Awaiting disposal |
| Turbulent | S87 | Vickers Shipbuilding and Engineering, Barrow-in-Furness | 8 May 1980 | 1 December 1982 | 28 April 1984 | 14 July 2012 | Awaiting disposal |
| Tireless | S88 | Vickers Shipbuilding and Engineering, Barrow-in-Furness | 6 June 1981 | 17 March 1984 | 5 October 1985 | 19 June 2014 | Awaiting disposal |
| Torbay | S90 | Vickers Shipbuilding and Engineering, Barrow-in-Furness | 3 December 1982 | 8 March 1985 | 7 February 1987 | 14 July 2017 | Awaiting disposal |
| Trenchant | S91 | Vickers Shipbuilding and Engineering, Barrow-in-Furness | 28 October 1985 | 3 November 1986 | 14 January 1989 | 20 May 2022 | Awaiting disposal |
| Talent | S92 | Vickers Shipbuilding and Engineering, Barrow-in-Furness | 13 May 1986 | 15 April 1988 | 12 May 1990 | 20 May 2022 | Awaiting disposal |
| Triumph | S93 | Vickers Shipbuilding and Engineering, Barrow-in-Furness | 2 February 1987 | 16 February 1991 | 12 October 1991 | July 2025 | Awaiting disposal |

== Operational service ==
The submarines of the class saw service in a wide range of locations, most notably firing Tomahawk land-attack cruise missiles in anger at targets during conflicts in Afghanistan, Iraq and Libya. Three of the Trafalgar-class boats were involved in such operations. In 2001 Trafalgar took part in Operation Veritas, the attack on al-Qaeda and Taliban forces following the 11 September attacks in the United States, becoming the first Royal Navy submarine to launch Tomahawk cruise missiles against targets in Afghanistan. During April 2003, Turbulent returned home flying the Jolly Roger after having launched thirty Tomahawk cruise missiles during the invasion of Iraq. As part of the 2011 military intervention in Libya, Triumph fired her Tomahawk cruise missiles on three occasions; first on 19 March, then again on 20 March, and finally on 24 March. Her primary targets were Libyan air-defence installations around the city of Sabha. Triumph returned to Devonport on 3 April 2011 flying a Jolly Roger adorned with six small Tomahawk axes to indicate the missiles fired by the submarine in the operation.

In 1993 Triumph sailed to Australia, covering a distance of 41,000 miles (66,000 km) whilst submerged and without any forward support. As of 2011, this remained the longest solo deployment by any British nuclear submarine.

=== Service problems ===
In 1998, Trenchant experienced a steam leak, forcing the crew to shut down the nuclear reactor. In 2000 a leak in the PWR1 reactor primary cooling circuit was discovered on Tireless, forcing her to proceed to Gibraltar on diesel power. The fault was found to be due to thermal fatigue cracks, requiring the other Trafalgar-class boats, and some of the remaining Swiftsure-class boats, to be urgently inspected and if necessary modified.

In 2011, Crew members inside Turbulent in the Indian Ocean experienced temperatures as high as 60°C due to failure of the air conditioning. The boat dived in an attempt to cool the hull whilst the problem was being diagnosed, which was traced to coolant inlet pipes being blocked by barnacles.

In 2013 the Defence Nuclear Safety Regulator reported that the reactor systems were suffering increasing technical problems due to ageing, requiring effective management. An example was that Tireless had had a small radioactive coolant leak for eight days in February 2013.

== Potential export ==
In 1987, the Canadian White Paper on Defence recommended the purchase of 10 to 12 Rubis- or Trafalgar-class submarines under technology transfer, with the choice of the type of submarine due to be confirmed before summer 1988. The goal was to build up a three-ocean navy and to assert Canadian sovereignty over Arctic waters. The purchase was abandoned in April 1989 due to a growing budget deficit.

== In fiction ==
In June 2019, ITV commissioned a six-part thriller to be set aboard a fictional Trafalgar-class submarine, HMS Tenacity. However, production on the series was paused in 2020, before being dropped all together by November 2021.

Tom Clancy's and Larry Bond's 1986 novel Red Storm Rising depicted the Trafalgar-class subs as highly effective against Soviet subs, with HMS Torbay having a key role in one battle.

== See also ==
- List of submarines of the Royal Navy
- List of submarine classes of the Royal Navy
- Royal Navy Submarine Service
- Future of the Royal Navy
- Cruise missile submarine
- Attack submarine

== Bibliography ==
- MaritimeQuest Trafalgar-class overview
- Abridged history of each boat
