= Sonar 2076 =

Submarine sonar detection system

Sonar 2076 is a submarine sonar detection system designed by Thales for the Royal Navy.

The system comprises an integrated suite of active and passive sonar systems including bow, fin, flank and towed arrays. Known components include:

- Type 2077 Parian obstacle avoidance sonar
- Type 2081 environmental monitor
- Type 2094 oceanographic sonar
- Type 2079 active-passive bow sonar
- Type 2078 fire control bow element
- Type 2065 towed array
- Flank array

Support systems include command consoles, upgraded radio communications, upgraded signature reduction, and new flexi couplings to reduce self noise. Sonar 2076 is designed to be fitted into both the new Astute-class submarine and the existing Trafalgar-class submarine, allowing the Royal Navy's entire submarine fleet to have a common sonar system. BAE Systems, which is responsible for building the Astute-class submarines and integrating the Type 2076 Sonar, claims that the 2076 represents a "step change" over previous sonars and is one of the world's most advanced sonar systems. BAE further claims it to have 13,000 hydrophones, many times the number fitted in previous Royal Navy systems and more than any other submarine sonar in the world as of 2010. A key development is the use of high performance and easily upgradeable commercial off-the-shelf (COTS) processing systems, allowing the introduction of much more sophisticated algorithms compared to earlier sonars. The processing power of the system is said to be equivalent to 60,000 home PCs.

Swiftsure and Trafalgar Update manager, Captain Ian Hughes said, "A good analogy for the performance of Sonar 2076 is that if the submarine was in Winchester it would be able to track a double decker bus going round Trafalgar Square" (a distance of about 60 miles).

In September 2025, a successor system named Sonar 2176 was announced to be under development by Thales UK. This new system is expected to equip the future SSN-AUKUS submarines for the United Kingdom.
