= HMS Trafalgar (S107) =

Trafalgar-class nuclear-powered attack submarine of the Royal Navy

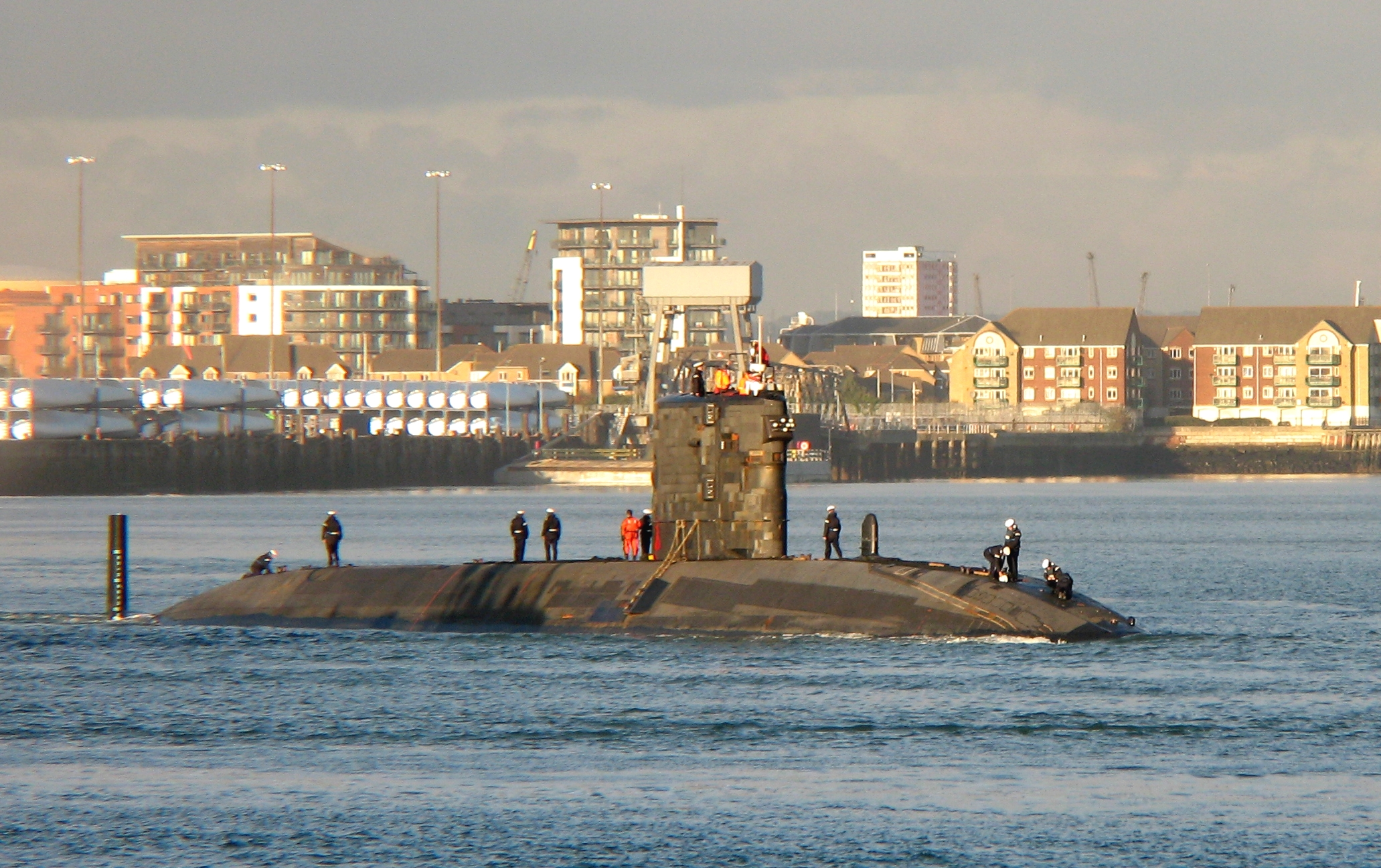
- HMS Trafalgar, 2008

History

United Kingdom
- Name: HMS Trafalgar
- Namesake: Battle of Trafalgar
- Ordered: 7 April 1977
- Builder: Vickers Shipbuilding and Engineering, Barrow-in-Furness
- Laid down: 15 April 1979
- Launched: 1 July 1981
- Commissioned: 27 May 1983
- Decommissioned: 4 December 2009
- Home port: HMNB Devonport, Plymouth
- Fate: Awaiting Disposal
- Badge

General characteristics
- Class & type: Trafalgar-class submarine
- Displacement: Surfaced: 4,500 to 4,800 t (4,700 long tons; 5,300 short tons); Submerged: 5,200 to 5,300 t (5,200 long tons; 5,800 short tons)
- Length: 85.4 m (280 ft)
- Beam: 9.8 m (32 ft)
- Draught: 9.5 m (31 ft)
- Propulsion: 1 × Rolls-Royce PWR1 nuclear reactor; 2 × GEC steam turbines; 2 × WH Allen turbo generators; 3.2 MW; 2 × Paxman diesel generators 2,800 shp (2.1 MW); 1 × 7-bladed conventional propeller; 1 × motor for emergency drive; 1 × auxiliary retractable prop
- Speed: Over 30 knots (56 km/h), submerged
- Range: Unlimited
- Complement: 130
- Electronic warfare & decoys: 2 × SSE Mk8 launchers for Type 2066 and Type 2071 torpedo decoys; RESM Racal UAP passive intercept; CESM Outfit CXA; SAWCS decoys carried from 2002
- Armament: 5 × 21-inch (533 mm) torpedo tubes with stowage for up to 30 weapons: Tomahawk Block IV cruise missiles; Spearfish heavyweight torpedoes

Service record
- Operations: Operation Veritas (Afghanistan)

HMS Trafalgar is a decommissioned Trafalgar-class submarine of the Royal Navy. Unlike the rest of the Trafalgar-class boats that followed, she was not launched with a pump-jet propulsion system, but with a conventional 7-bladed propeller. Trafalgar was the fifth vessel of the Royal Navy to bear the name, after the 1805 Battle of Trafalgar.

== Operational history ==
In 2012 a Royal Navy submariner was jailed for 8 years for trying "to pass secrets to the Russians that could have undermined Britain's national security"; one element of this was information on "a secret operation undertaken by HMS Trafalgar.

=== Combat history ===
After Operation Veritas, the attack on Al-Qaeda and Taliban forces following the September 11 attacks in the United States, Trafalgar entered Plymouth Sound flying the Jolly Roger on 1 March 2002. She was welcomed back by Admiral Sir Alan West, Commander-in-Chief of the fleet and it emerged she was the first Royal Navy submarine to launch Tomahawk cruise missiles against Afghanistan.

=== Grounding incidents ===
In July 1996, Trafalgar grounded near the Isle of Skye in Scotland.

In November 2002, Trafalgar again ran aground close to the Isle of Skye, causing £5 million worth of damage to her hull and injuring three sailors. She was travelling 50 metres below the surface at more than 14 knots when Lieutenant-Commander Tim Green, a student in the "Perisher" course for new submarine commanders, ordered a course change that took her onto the rocks at Fladda-chuain, a small but well-charted islet. Commander Robert Fancy, responsible for navigation, and Commander Ian McGhie, an instructor, both pleaded guilty at court-martial to contributing to the accident. On 9 March 2004 the court reprimanded both for negligence. Green was not prosecuted, but received an administrative censure.

In May 2008 it was reported that the crash was caused by the chart being used in the exercise being covered with tracing paper, to prevent students marking it.

=== Decommissioning ===
Trafalgar was decommissioned on 4 December 2009 at Devonport.
