= HMS Talent (S92) =

Trafalgar-class nuclear-powered attack submarine of the Royal Navy

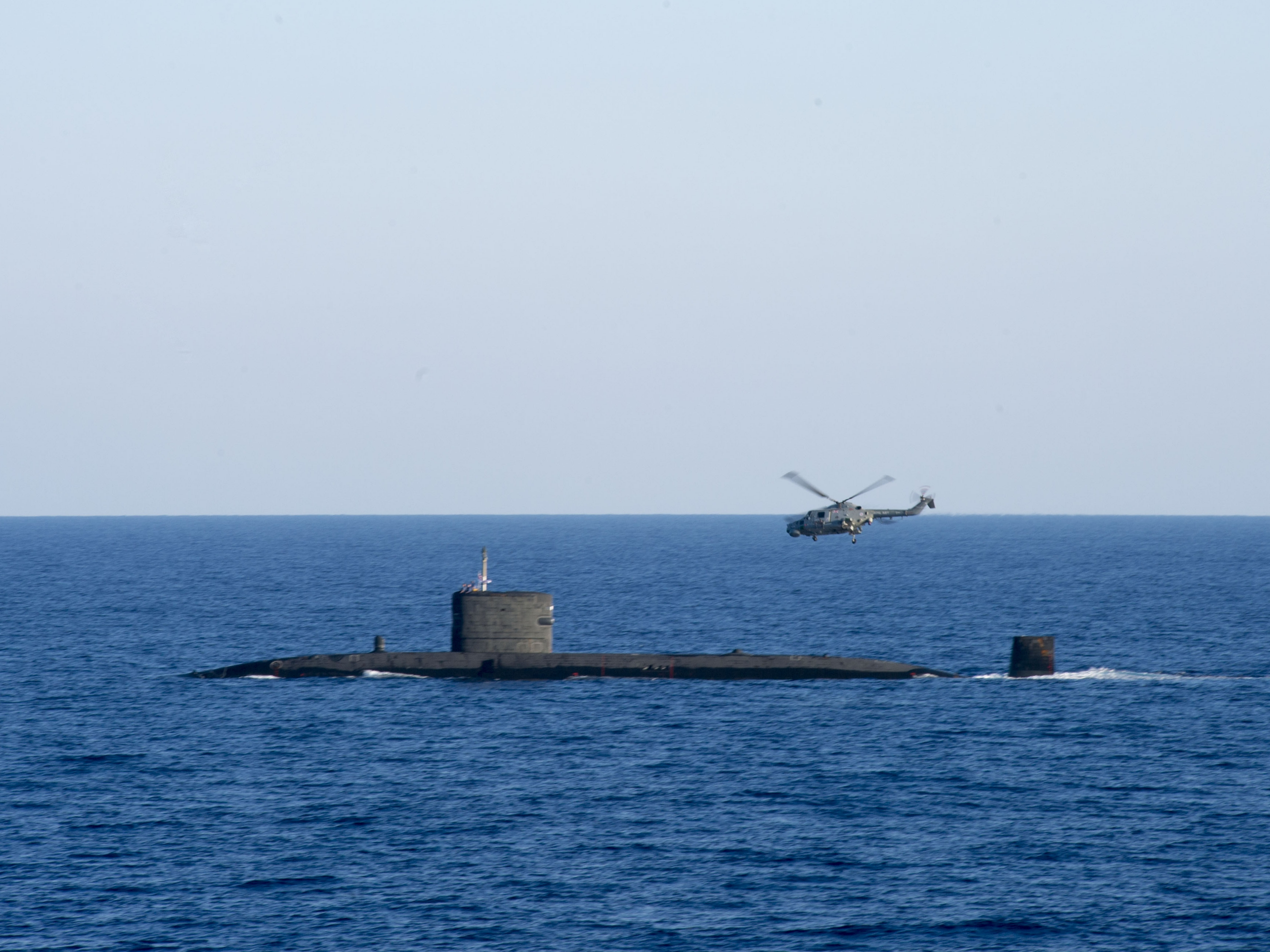
- Talent in the Mediterranean Sea, October 2013.

History

United Kingdom
- Name: HMS Talent
- Ordered: 10 September 1984
- Builder: Vickers Shipbuilding and Engineering, Barrow-in-Furness
- Laid down: 13 May 1986
- Launched: 15 April 1988
- Sponsored by: The Princess Royal
- Commissioned: 12 May 1990
- Decommissioned: 20 May 2022
- Home port: HMNB Clyde, Faslane
- Identification: S92
- Status: Decommissioned
- Badge

General characteristics
- Class & type: Trafalgar-class submarine
- Displacement: Surfaced: 4,500 to 4,800 t (4,700 long tons; 5,300 short tons); Submerged: 5,200 to 5,300 t (5,200 long tons; 5,800 short tons)
- Length: 85.4 m (280 ft 2 in)
- Beam: 9.8 m (32 ft 2 in)
- Draught: 9.5 m (31 ft 2 in)
- Propulsion: 1 × Rolls-Royce PWR1 nuclear reactor, HEU 93.5%; 2 × GEC steam turbines; 2 × WH Allen turbo generators; 3.2 MW; 2 × Paxman diesel generators 2,800 shp (2.1 MW); 1 × pump jet propulsor; 1 × motor for emergency drive; 1 × auxiliary retractable prop
- Speed: Over 30 knots (56 km/h; 35 mph), submerged
- Range: Unlimited
- Complement: 130
- Sensors & processing systems: Sonar 2076
- Electronic warfare & decoys: 2 × SSE Mk8 launchers for Type 2066 and Type 2071 torpedo decoys; RESM Racal UAP passive intercept; CESM Outfit CXA; SAWCS decoys carried from 2002
- Armament: 5 × 21-inch (533 mm) torpedo tubes with stowage for up to 30 weapons: Tomahawk Block IV cruise missiles; Spearfish heavyweight torpedoes

HMS Talent is the sixth of seven Trafalgar-class nuclear submarines operated by the Royal Navy from 1990 until 2022. It was built at Barrow-in-Furness.

== Name ==
Talent is the third submarine of the Royal Navy to bear the name. The first was a T-class submarine that was transferred to the Royal Netherlands Navy as HNLMS Zwaardvisch before launching in 1943. The second, was also a T-class submarine, launched in 1945 and operated by the Royal Navy until 1966.

== Operational history ==
Talent was launched by The Princess Royal in April 1988, and commissioned in May 1990.

Talent entered HMNB Devonport, its homeport, for a refit, rejoining the active fleet in March 2007 following a £386 million upgrade. This included a new reactor core, and updated sonar suite: Sonar 2076.

In 2009, Talent suffered loss of primary and alternative power supplies to its nuclear reactors while in dock.

On 6 August 2013, Talent returned to Plymouth after a 3-month deployment. In October 2013, the submarine conducted an anti-submarine exercise with HMS Dragon, USS Gravely, USS Stout and USS Barry.

In April 2015, it was reported that Talent had struck ice at some point in 2014 while tracking Russian vessels.

Talent moved from Devonport to HMNB Clyde in July 2019.

Although originally scheduled for decommissioning in 2021, the slow delivery of the Astute-class boats meant that Talent was retained in service for at least an additional 12 months, with a planned out of service date extended to the end of 2022.

Under the terms of the 2021 Integrated Review, Talent was scheduled to be decommissioned by the end of 2022, to be replaced by HMS Anson, the fifth Astute-class submarine. In April 2022, it was reported that Talent was being prepared for disposal and the submarine was decommissioned in a joint ceremony with Trenchant on 20 May 2022, in the presence of the Princess Royal.

== Affiliations ==
The boat was affiliated with the town of Shrewsbury in Shropshire, and while commissioned, its crew enjoyed Freedom of the Town.

The submarine's sponsor was the Princess Royal, who presided over its launch in 1988 and its decommissioning ceremony in 2022.

== See also ==
- HMS Anson - Talent's replacement.
