= Military assistant =

A military assistant is sub-speciality of secretarial duties in the British Armed Forces and many of those derived from them, is an officer appointed to the personal office of a general officer. Whilst aides de camp (ADCs) are responsible for administration, MAs provide the general (or flag) officer with advice, guidance and insight commensurate with past experience and rank. It is a highly privileged, competitive position that often serves as an apprenticeship for the future.

== Equivalent ==
In the Canadian Forces, the equivalent position is that of executive assistant.

In the United States Department of Defense, a military assistant is a military officer serving as aide to very senior civilian (typically a presidential appointee in Office of the Secretary of Defense or in the service secretariats), while a military officer in an equivalent position serving a general/flag officer is an executive assistant.

== See also ==
- Administrative assistant
- Aide de camp
- Adjutant
- Equerry
- Personal assistant
