= HMS Torbay (S90) =

Trafalgar-class nuclear-powered attack submarine of the Royal Navy

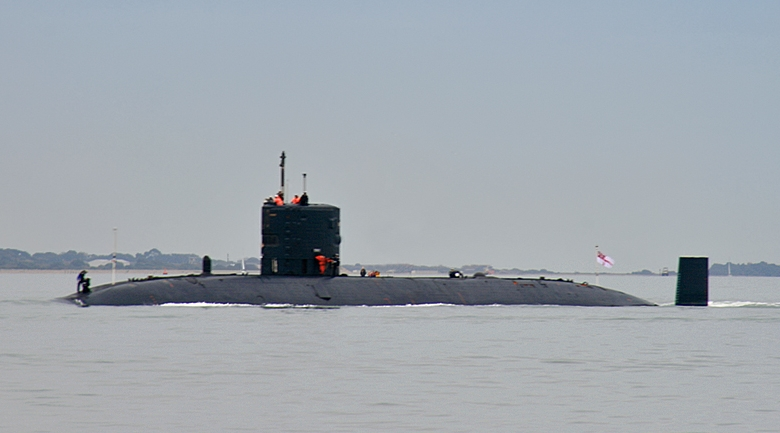
- HMS Torbay rounding Calshot Spit, Southampton in November 2010.

History

United Kingdom
- Name: HMS Torbay
- Namesake: Torbay
- Builder: Vickers Shipbuilding and Engineering, Barrow-in-Furness
- Laid down: 3 December 1982
- Launched: 8 March 1985
- Sponsored by: Lady Ann Herbert
- Commissioned: 7 February 1987
- Decommissioned: 14 July 2017
- Home port: HMNB Devonport, Plymouth
- Fate: Decommissioned
- Badge

General characteristics
- Class & type: Trafalgar-class submarine
- Displacement: Surfaced: 4,500 to 4,800 t (4,700 long tons; 5,300 short tons); Submerged: 5,200 to 5,300 t (5,200 long tons; 5,800 short tons)
- Length: 85.4 m (280 ft)
- Beam: 9.8 m (32 ft)
- Draught: 9.5 m (31 ft)
- Propulsion: 1 × Rolls-Royce PWR1 nuclear reactor, HEU 93.5%; 2 × GEC steam turbines; 2 × WH Allen turbo generators; 3.2 MW; 2 × Paxman diesel generators 2,800 shp (2.1 MW); 1 × pump jet propulsor; 1 × motor for emergency drive; 1 × auxiliary retractable prop
- Speed: Over 30 knots (56 km/h), submerged
- Range: Unlimited
- Complement: 130
- Electronic warfare & decoys: 2 × SSE Mk8 launchers for Type 2066 and Type 2071 torpedo decoys; RESM Racal UAP passive intercept; CESM Outfit CXA; SAWCS decoys carried from 2002
- Armament: 5 × 21-inch (533 mm) torpedo tubes with stowage for up to 30 weapons: Tomahawk Block IV cruise missiles; Spearfish heavyweight torpedoes

HMS Torbay is a decommissioned Trafalgar-class nuclear submarine of the Royal Navy and the fourth vessel of her class. Torbay was the fifth vessel and the second submarine of the Royal Navy to be named after Torbay in Devon, England. The first vessel was the 80-gun second rate HMS Torbay launched in 1693.

She was the first vessel to be fitted with the new command system SMCS NG.

Torbay was scheduled to be decommissioned in 2015, to be replaced by one of the new Astute-class submarines. As of November 2013 she was undergoing extended maintenance and upgrades. The work allowed for a two-year life extension beyond the previously-planned decommissioning date. On 6 June 2017, she entered Gibraltar Naval Base flying her paying-off pennant and, on Friday 14 July 2017, the vessel was decommissioned in Devonport.

== Operational history ==
Torbay completed a refuel and modernisation process in February 2001.

In early 2006, Torbay was the participant in an experiment in the use of colour schemes to reduce the visibility of submarines from the air. The standard black paint of Royal Navy submarines was replaced by a carefully selected shade of blue. This was the result of research that found that black was the worst possible colour for a submarine attempting to avoid detection from the air. This change is in part the result of the changing nature of Royal Navy commitments since the end of the Cold War, with Navy operations moving from the murky waters of the North Atlantic to the clearer waters of the Arabian Sea and the Indian Ocean.

In November 2010, it was reported in Hansard that Torbay had run aground in the Eastern Mediterranean in April 2009.

In May 2011, she took part in Exercise Saxon Warrior in the Western Approaches. The exercise included the aircraft carrier USS George H.W. Bush, HMS Dauntless, HMS Westminster, and a number of other vessels and culminated in a "Thursday War".

In late 2011 she entered a revalidation and assisted maintenance period (RAMP) at Devonport Royal Dockyard. This includes communications upgrades with installation of the Cromwell radio antenna to enhance internal communications and the ship alongside upgrade, plus inspection of the hull and reactor, an overhaul of one of the reactor coolers and upgrades to many other systems. As of September 2012 the RAMP was 85% complete, with a return to service originally planned for summer 2013.

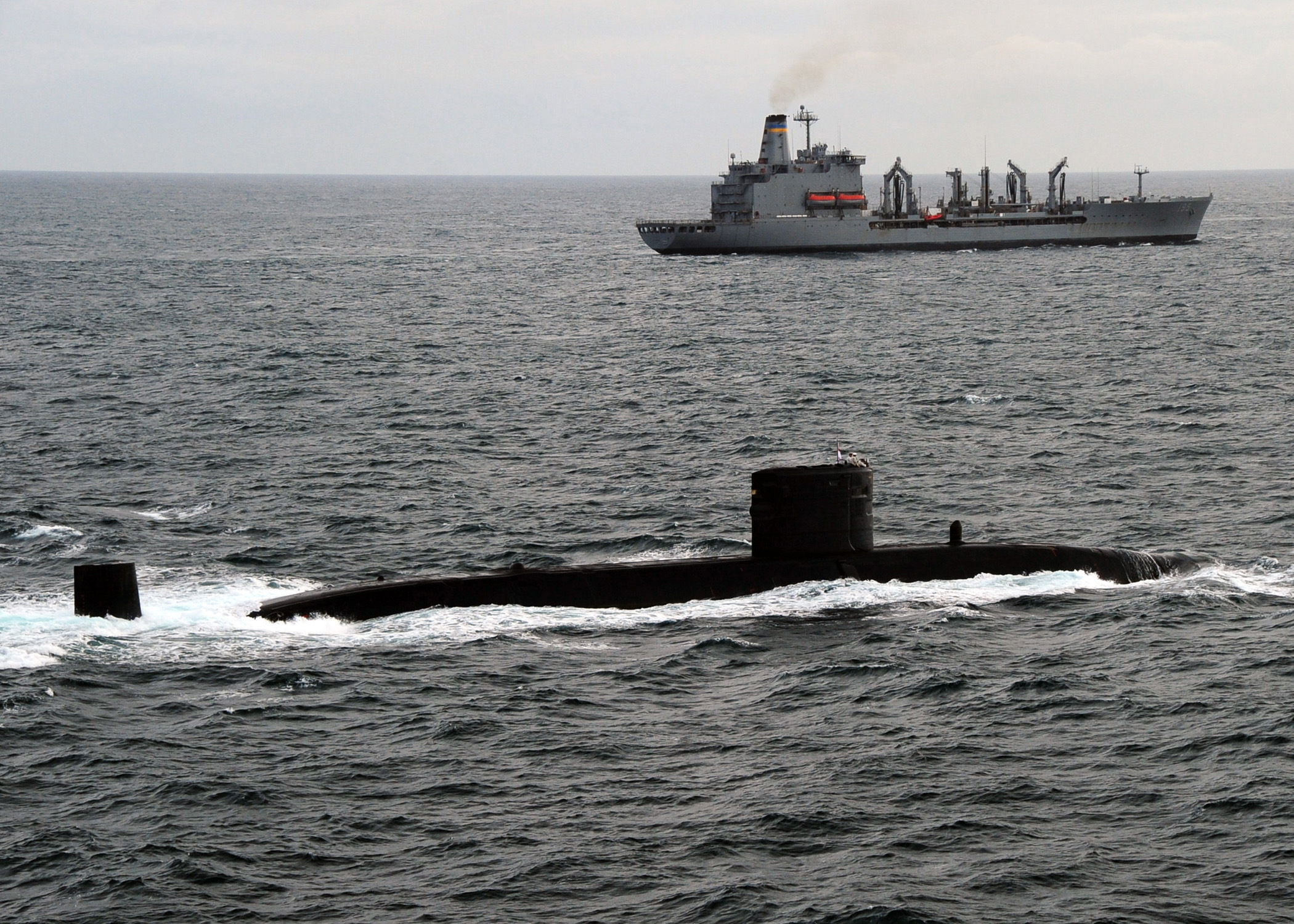
Torbay underway in formation with the US oiler Leroy Grumman during Exercise Saxon Warrior 11.

In 2013, there was a fire on board.

She made her final entry to Devonport on 19 June 2017 prior to her formal decommissioning parade on 14 July 2017.

== Bibliography ==
- Hutchinson, Robert (2001). Jane's submarines : war beneath the waves from 1776 to the present day. London: HarperCollins. ISBN 978-0007105588.
