= Russian frigate Neustrashimy =

Krivak-class frigate

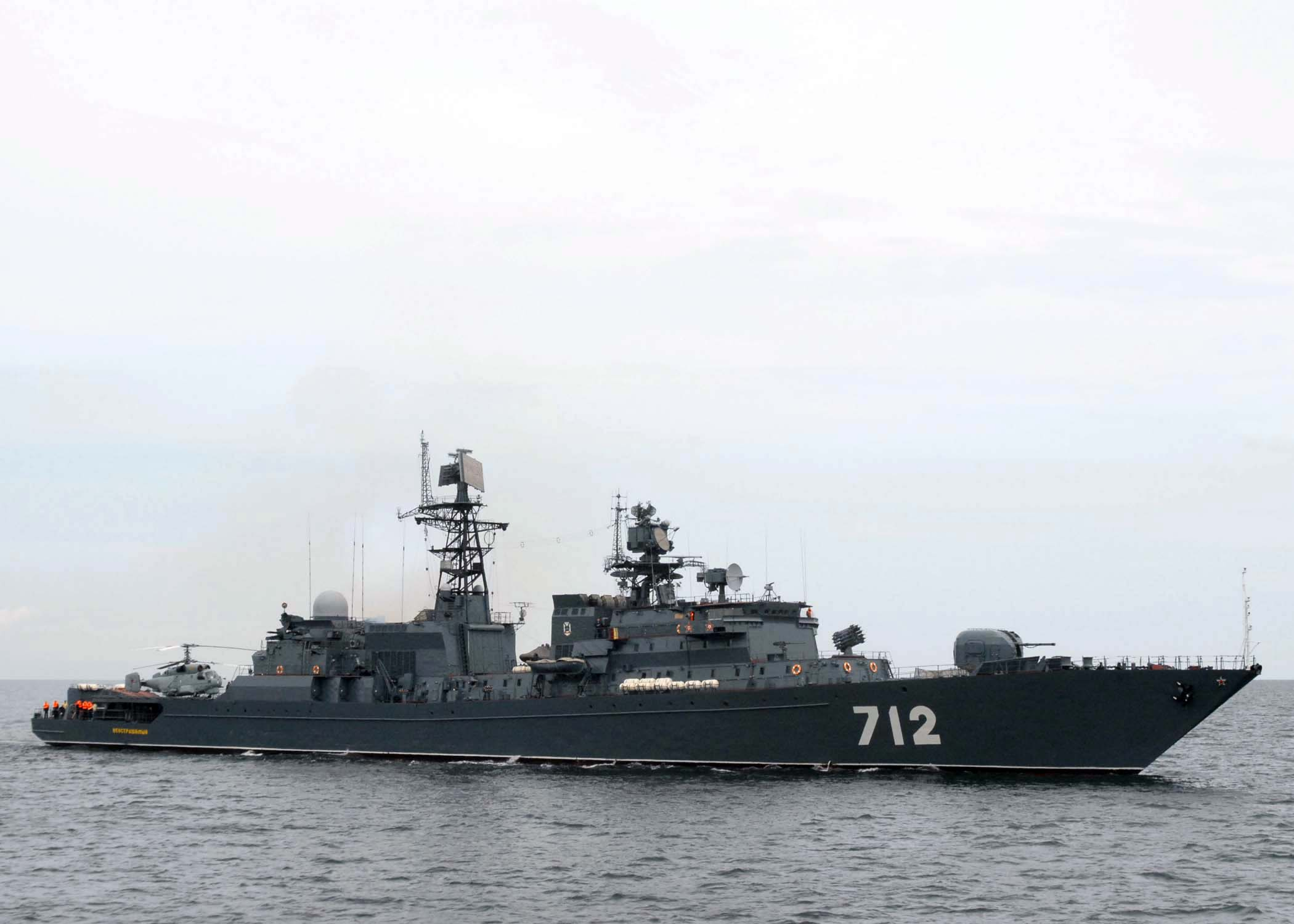
- Neustrashimy during BALTOPS 2008 exercise, 12 June

History

Soviet Union → Russia
- Name: Neustrashimy; (Неустрашимый)
- Namesake: Russian for Dauntless or Fearless
- Builder: Yantar Shipyard, Kaliningrad
- Yard number: 401
- Laid down: 25 March 1987
- Launched: 25 May 1988
- Commissioned: 24 January 1993
- Home port: Baltiysk
- Status: In active service

General characteristics
- Class & type: Neustrashimy-class frigate
- Displacement: 3,505 t (3,450 long tons) (standard); 4,318 t (4,250 long tons) (full)
- Length: 129.6 m (425 ft 2 in)
- Beam: 15.5 m (50 ft 10 in)
- Draught: 4.8 m (15 ft 9 in)
- Propulsion: COGAG; 2 × 24,300 shp (18,100 kW) M90 gas turbines; 2 × 12,100 shp (9,000 kW) M70 gas turbines; 2 shafts
- Speed: 30 kn (56 km/h; 35 mph)
- Range: 4,500 nautical miles (8,334 km; 5,179 mi) at 16 kn (30 km/h; 18 mph)
- Complement: 210
- Sensors & processing systems: MR-352 Positiv air/surface search radar; MR-750 Fregat-MA air search radar; Nayada-1 navigational radar; MR-145 Lev fire control radar; 3R95 fire control radar; MGK-365 Zvezda-1M sonar suite
- Electronic warfare & decoys: MP-405-1 Start ESM; MP-407 ECM; Spektr-F laser intercept; PK-16 and PK-10 chaff launchers
- Armament: 1 × 100 mm (4 in) A-190E gun; 2 × Kashtan CIWS; 4 × 8 3K95 Kinzhal SAM launchers; 6 × 533 mm (21 in) torpedo tubes for RPK-2/6 anti-submarine missiles or Type 53 torpedoes; 1 × RBU-6000 Smerch-2 anti-submarine rocket launcher; naval mines
- Aircraft carried: 1 × Kamov Ka-27PL
- Aviation facilities: Helipad and hangar

Neustrashimy (also transliterated Neustrashimyy, Russian: Неустрашимый, lit. "dauntless" or "fearless") is the lead ship of the Neustrashimy-class frigate (Russian designation Project 11540 Yastreb) of the Russian Navy's Baltic Fleet.

== Design and description ==
Neustrashimy is 129.6 m (425 ft 2 in) long overall and 123 m (403 ft 7 in) at the waterline, with a beam of 15.5 m (50 ft 10 in) and a draught of 4.8 m (15 ft 9 in). Displacing 3,505 t (3,450 long tons) standard and 4,318 t (4,250 long tons) full load, the ship's power is provided by two 24,300 shp (18,100 kW) M90 and two 12,100 shp (9,000 kW) M70 gas turbines arranged in a combined gas turbine and gas turbine (COGAG) installation, driving two fixed-pitch propellers. Her maximum speed is 30 knots (56 km/h; 35 mph) and range of 4,500 nautical miles (8,334 km; 5,179 mi) at 16 kn (30 km/h; 18 mph). The ship's complement is 210, including 35 officers.

Neustrashimy is armed with one 100 mm (4 in) A-190E gun. Defence against aircraft are provided by thirty two 3K95 Kinzhal (SA-N-9 'Gauntlet') surface-to-air missiles launched from four octuple vertical launching system cells, and two Kashtan close-in weapon systems, each consisted of two 30 mm AO-18K rotary cannons and two 9M311-1 missile launchers with thirty two missiles each, four of which are ready-to-fire from the launcher. For anti-submarine warfare, the ship are equipped with a single RBU-6000 213 mm (8 in) Smerch-2 12-barrel anti-submarine rocket launcher and six (three on each sides) fixed-mounted 533 mm (21 in) torpedo launchers, which could launch RPK-2 Vyuga (SS-N-15 'Starfish') or RPK-6 Vodopad (SS-N-16 'Stallion') anti-submarine missiles and 53-65K wake homing or SET-65 anti-submarine homing torpedoes. The ship also has provisions of two naval mines rails.

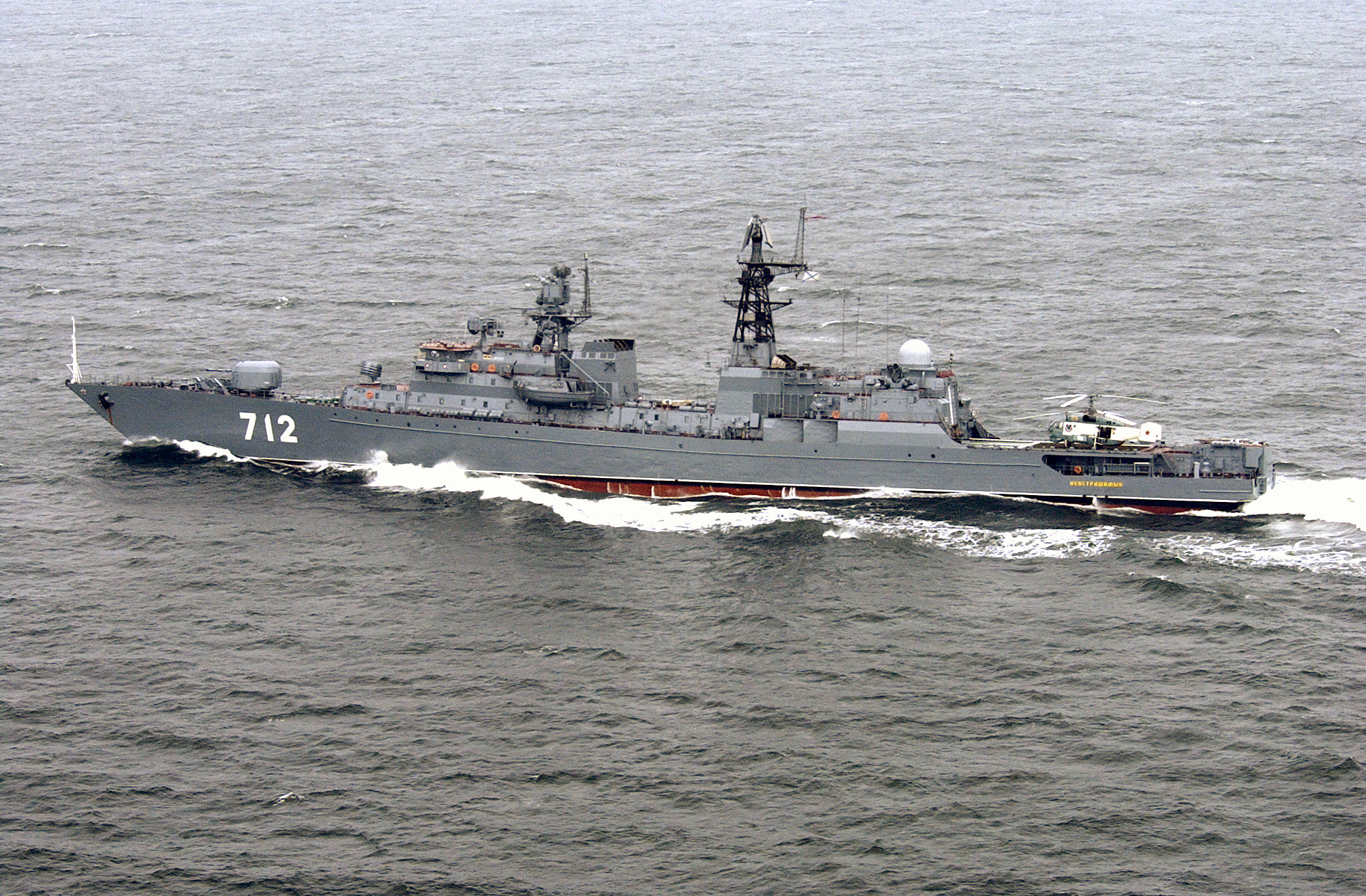
Neustrashimy in 2004

The ship electronic and sensor suites includes Tron and Diplomant combat management systems, MR-750 Fregat-MA air search radar, MR-352 Positiv air/surface search radar, two Nayada-1 navigation radars, MP-405-1 Start Electronic Support Measures (ESM) system, MP-407 electronic countermeasure, and Spektr-F laser intercept. The frigate has MGK-365 Zvezda-1M sonar suite, consisted of hull-mounted active/passive sonar and variable depth sonar. Fire control for the guns consisted of MR-145 Lev radar for the 100 mm gun and 3R95 radar for the 3K95 Kinzhal (SA-N-9 'Gauntlet') missiles. The vessel was also equipped with two PK-16 and six PK-10 decoy-dispenser system which used chaff as a form of missile defense.

The frigate has a helicopter hangar, flight deck and carried a Kamov Ka-27PL anti-submarine helicopter.

== Construction and career ==
Her keel was laid on 25 or 27 March 1987 with yard number 401 at the Yantar Shipyard in Kaliningrad. The ship was launched on 25 May 1988. The frigate was completed on 28 December 1990 and started sea trials in the Baltic Sea at that month. Neustrashimy was commissioned to the Baltic Fleet of Russian Navy on 24 January 1993. The ship is based at Baltiysk.

Neustrashimy made a friendly visit to Kiel, Germany for the occasion of 100th anniversary of the Kiel Canal. She participated in numerous joint exercise with the European navies in the 2000s. The ship paid a visit to London in 2003 in conjunction with President Vladimir Putin visit to the city.

In late September 2008, Neustrashimy left the Baltic Fleet and was sent to the Gulf of Aden waters off the Somali coast to fight piracy in the region. Russian navy spokesman Captain Igor Dygalo told the Associated Press that the missile frigate Neustrashimy had left the Baltic Sea port of Baltiisk a day before the hijacking to cooperate with other unspecified countries in anti-piracy efforts. As of 27 October, the frigate was operating independently in the vicinity of a group of NATO warships near the Somali coast. On 11 November, Neustrashimy helped capture suspected pirates along with Royal Marines from HMS Cumberland; the suspected pirates had been attempting to board the merchant vessel MV Powerful. On 16 November 2008, the frigate prevented pirates from capturing the Saudi Arabian ship MV Rabih.

From 2014 Neustrashimy was in overhaul with the deadline for the completion of her refit having passed on several occasions, partly due to the problem of acquiring parts for her Ukrainian-made engines. However, the ship completed her refit in December 2021 and is scheduled to return to the fleet in April 2022. Post-refit sea trials were underway as of February 2022. In July, Neustrashimy was reported to have fired the SA-N-9 air defence missile during its tests at sea. The ship completed post-refit sea trials and rejoined the fleet in April 2023.

During a 2024 voyage from its Baltic Fleet base with other vessels, including Smolnyy, the vessel visited the port of Havana, Cuba on 27 July. After leaving Dar es Salaam on 21 September, she docked in Simon's Town on 3 October with the replenishment ship Akademik Pashin in time for the South African Navy Festival.

The ship was reported active in the North Sea as of 2026, replenishing from the Russian supply ship PM-82. In July 2026, Neustrashimy conducted a live fire exercise off Plymouth.
