= R71 =

R71 may refer to:

- R71 (South Africa), a road
- R71 (star)
- R71, designation of service on the Aigle–Sépey–Diablerets railway line
- 2009 Washington Referendum 71
- BMW R71, a motorcycle on which the IMZ-Ural is based
- HMS Constance (R71), a destroyer of the Royal Navy
- HMS Vengeance (R71), an aircraft carrier of the Royal Navy
- Plant small nucleolar RNA R71
