= Neustrashimy-class frigate =

1986 class of Russian frigates

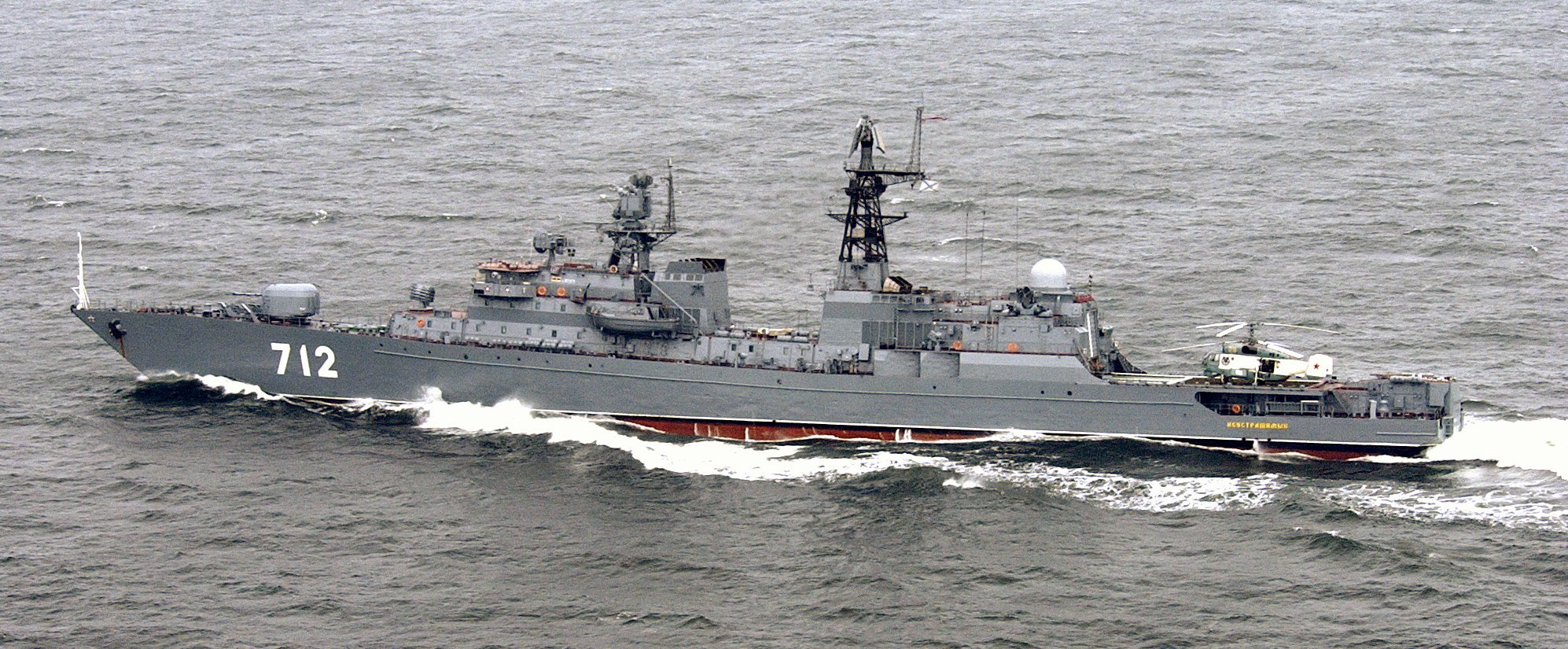
- Russian frigate Neustrashimy

Class overview
- Name: Neustrashimy class
- Builders: Yantar Shipyard, Kaliningrad
- Operators: Soviet Navy; Russian Navy
- Preceded by: Krivak class
- Succeeded by: Admiral Gorshkov class; Admiral Grigorovich class
- Built: 1986–2009
- Planned: 7
- Completed: 2
- Cancelled: 5
- Active: 2

General characteristics
- Type: Guided-missile frigate
- Displacement: Standard: 3,800 tons; Full: 4,400 tons
- Length: 129 m (423 ft 3 in)
- Beam: 15.6 m (51 ft 2 in)
- Draught: 5.6 m (18 ft 4 in)
- Installed power: 110,000 hp (82,000 kW)
- Propulsion: 2 shaft COGAG 2x M70 or D090 cruise and 2x M90 boost gas turbines
- Speed: 30 knots (56 km/h; 35 mph)
- Complement: 210
- Sensors & processing systems: Radar: 1 Top Plate, 2 Palm Frond, Cross Sword, 1 Kite Screech; Sonar: Ox Yoke LF bow mounted sonar and Ox Tail VDS
- Armament: Anti-ship missiles: 2 × 4 SS-N-25 (installed only on the Yaroslav Mudry); SAM: 4 × 8 VLS for SA-N-9; ASW: 1 × 12-tube RBU-6000 launcher; Guns: 1 × 100mm gun; CIWS: 2 × Kashtan; Torpedoes: 6 × 533mm tubes mounted in the superstructure for ASW missiles SS-N-15 or SS-N-16 or Type 53 ASW/ASuW torpedoes
- Aircraft carried: 1 Ka-27 Helicopter
- Aviation facilities: Helipad and Hangar

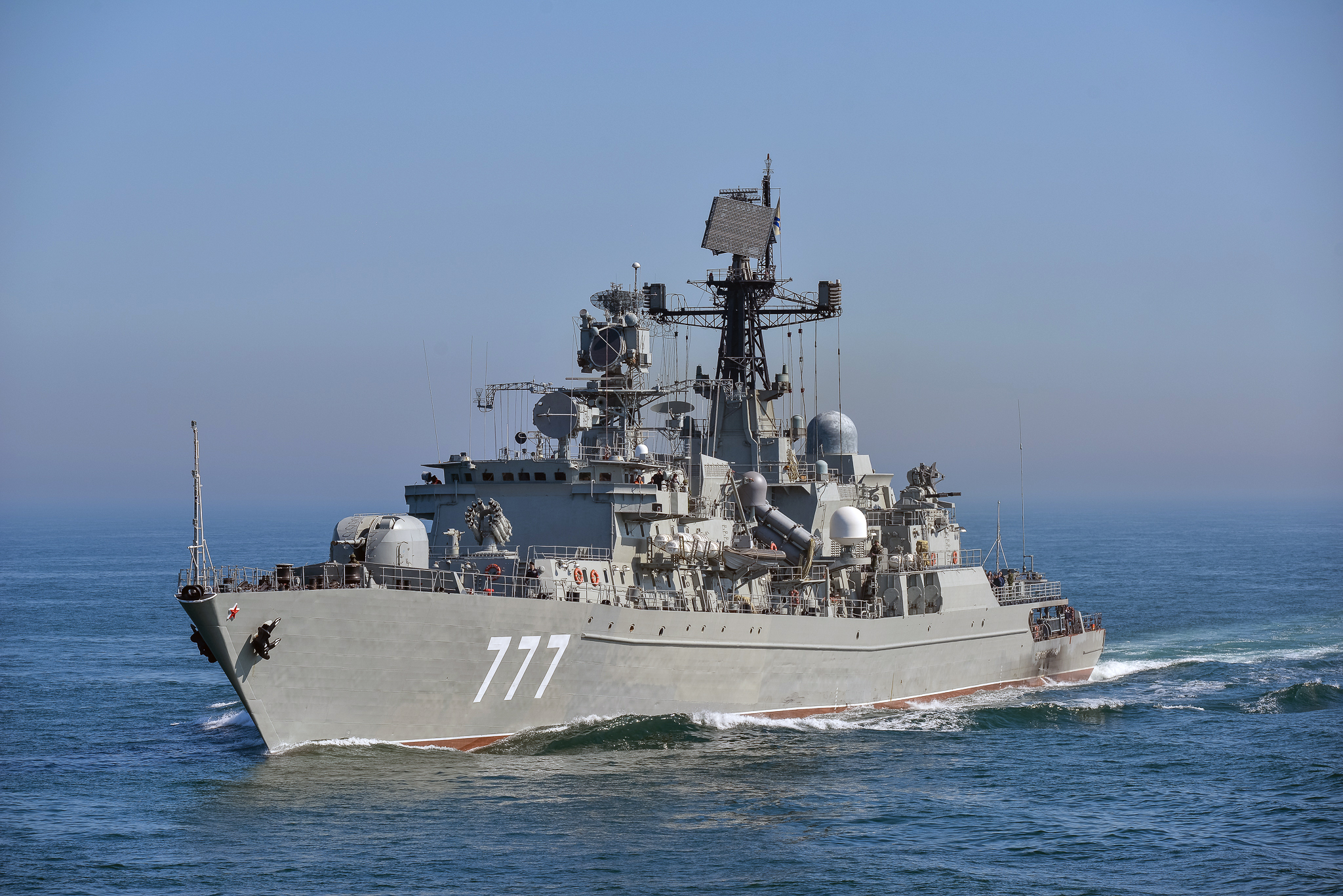
Russian frigate Yaroslav Mudry during its voyage through the English Channel, April 2018

The Neustrashimy class (Russian: Неустрашимый, alternate English spelling Neustrashimyy), Soviet designation Project 11540 Yastreb (hawk), is a series of large frigates built for the Soviet Navy and currently in service with the Russian Navy. Seven ships were planned for the Soviet Navy, but the fall of the Soviet Union disrupted those plans. Two ships were completed, both currently in active service with the Russian Baltic Fleet.

== Design and construction ==
The class was designed as a general purpose anti-submarine warfare (ASW) frigate to follow on from the Krivak-class frigates. The ship is equipped with a newly designed Zvezda-1 integrated sonar system (with NATO reporting name Ox Tail) as its primary ASW sensor.

The program started in 1986 and seven ships were originally planned. After the collapse of the Soviet Union the project was frozen and only one ship, Neustrashimy (Неустрашимый - "Dauntless"), was in active service with the Russian Baltic Fleet by the mid-1990s. On 24 February 2009 the second ship in the class, Yaroslav Mudry, left the Yantar shipyard in Russia's Kaliningrad for its first sea trials. As of 2010, both Neustrashimy and Yaroslav Mudry are operational with the Baltic Fleet.

The ships were built by Yantar Yard, Kaliningrad. Only Neustrashimy was completed by the time the Soviet Union collapsed. Two further ships were incomplete. Yaroslav Mudry (named after the great ruler of the Kievan Rus, Yaroslav the Wise) and Tuman ("Fog", named after a World War II era Soviet patrol boat whose crew exhibited great valour in combat with three German destroyers). As of 2009, the frigate Yaroslav Mudry began sea trials and entered service.

== Service history ==
=== 2008–2009 deployment to Somalia ===
In late September 2008, Neustrashimy left the Baltic Fleet and was sent to the Gulf of Aden waters off the Somali coast to fight piracy in the region. Russian navy spokesman Captain Igor Dygalo told the Associated Press that the missile frigate Neustrashimy had left the Baltic Sea port of Baltiysk a day before the hijacking to cooperate with other unspecified countries in anti-piracy efforts. As of 27 October, the frigate was operating independently in the vicinity of a group of NATO warships near the Somali coast. On 11 November, Neustrashimy helped capture suspected pirates along with Royal Marines from HMS Cumberland; the suspected pirates had been attempting to board the merchant vessel MV Powerful. On 16 November 2008, the frigate prevented pirates from capturing the Saudi Arabian ship MV Rabih.

=== Further deployment ===
In June 2016 Yaroslav Mudry was part of a maritime incident between Russian and United States navies in which the ship came in close proximity to USS Gravely in the Mediterranean, though both sides claim the other was at fault for the encounter. The American destroyer came within 315 yards (288 m) of the Russian vessel.

In April 2018, Yaroslav Mudry and Uda-class oiler Lena were escorted by the Royal Navy frigate HMS St Albans as they were passing through the English Channel en route to the Mediterranean Sea.

Yaroslav Mudry was again seen passing the English Channel on 1 November 2018.

On 1 October 2019, Yaroslav Mudry, tanker Yelnya, and tug Viktor Konetsky embarked on the INDRA-2019 exercise. On 21 October, the frigate under the command of Captain 2nd rank Mikhail Navolotsky paid a visit to the Cypriot port of Limassol and, in early December, patrolled the Gulf of Aden. On 10 December, the ships arrived to Mormugao, India and have been participating in the exercises till 19 December. On 27 December, the ships arrived at the Iranian port of Chakhbehar and participated in joint naval exercise. Between 4-7 January 2020, the ship detachment visited the Omani port of Salalah and afterwards started patrolling the Gulf of Aden again. Between 10-18 February, Yaroslav Mudry paid another visit to Salalah, Oman and between 4-6 March Colombo, Sri Lanka. On 4 May 2020, the ships returned to Baltiysk.

From 2014 Neustrashimy was in overhaul with the deadline for the completion of her refit having passed on several occasions, partly due to the problem of acquiring parts for her Ukrainian-made engines. However, the ship completed her refit in December 2021 and is scheduled to return to the fleet in April 2022. Post-refit sea trials were underway as of February 2022. In July, Neustrashimy was reported to have fired the SA-N-9 air defence missile during its tests at sea. In July 2026 while escorting a "shadow tanker" through the English Channel, Neustrashimy, unusually conducted live fire exercises including gunnery tests 40nm south of Plymouth. According to The Telegraph, the Baltic Fleet frigate Neustrashimy struck the tanker Valentin Rykov in the North Sea on October 22nd 2026.

=== Project 11541 "Korsar" ===
United Shipbuilding Corporation developed the escort ship Korsar based on the Neustrahimmy class. The Project 11541 Korsar escort ship is designed to search for, track, and engage surface, underwater, and air targets, as well as to perform escort and patrol tasks. The ship can carry out a wide range of missions, operating autonomously and within a tactical task force in sea and oceanic areas. The customer can choose as armament between 4 Kh-35 launchers with 16 missiles, 2 P-800 Oniks launchers with 8 missiles, 8 3M-54 Kalibr VLS cells or 2 P-270 Moskit launchers with 8 missiles.

== Ships ==
Name	Hull No.	Builder	Laid down	Launched	Commissioned	Fleet	Status
Neustrashimy	772 ex (712)	Yantar Shipyard, Kaliningrad	1986	May 1988	24 January 1993	Baltic Fleet	Completed Post-refit sea trials; rejoined the fleet April 2023
Yaroslav Mudry (ex-Nepristupnyi)	777 ex (727)	Yantar Shipyard, Kaliningrad	1988	May 1991	2009	Baltic Fleet	Active
Tuman		Yantar Shipyard, Kaliningrad	1990	1996			Cancelled

=== Building ===
The work on Tuman was suspended in late 1993 when about 47% complete due to lack of funding. In 1996, the ship was launched to clear space in slip and was subsequently laid up in 1998 to clear space in dry dock. In April 2016, the director of the Yantar shipyard announced the incomplete hulk was to be scrapped as the high cost of completing the ship to an outdated design was considered inefficient and the space freed up by its disposal could be employed on more cost-effective projects.

== See also ==
- List of ships of the Soviet Navy
- List of ships of Russia by project number
- List of frigate classes in service

Equivalent frigates of the same era

- Karel Doorman class
- Brandenburg class
- Anzac class
- Type 23
- Vasco da Gama class
- Halifax class
- G class
- Kang Ding class
