= Hugo White =

Royal Navy Admiral (1939–2014)

Admiral Sir Hugo White GCB CBE DL
- Born: 22 October 1939; Torquay, Devon
- Died: 1 June 2014 (aged 74)
- Military career
- Allegiance: United Kingdom
- Branch: Royal Navy
- Service years: 1960–97
- Rank: Admiral
- Commands: Commander-in-Chief Fleet; Flag Officer, Scotland and Northern Ireland; HMS Bristol; 4th Frigate Squadron; HMS Avenger; HMS Salisbury; HMS Oracle
- Conflicts: Cod Wars; Falklands War
- Awards: Knight Grand Cross of the Order of the Bath; Commander of the Order of the British Empire
- Other work: Governor of Gibraltar (1995–97)

Viceregal styles of Sir Hugo White (1995–1997)
- Reference style: His Excellency
- Spoken style: Your Excellency

Admiral Sir Hugo Moresby White, GCB, CBE, DL (22 October 1939 – 1 June 2014) was a senior officer of the Royal Navy and subsequently Governor of Gibraltar.

== Early life ==
White was born at Torquay, Devon, son of Hugh Fortescue Moresby White (1891–1979), CMG, of the Colonial Office, Senior Resident in Nigeria, and Elizabeth ("Betty") Sophia Pennington Brandt, daughter of Captain Frank Brandt, killed at the Battle of Coronel in command of HMS Monmouth. He was a descendant of Admiral of the Fleet Fairfax Moresby.

White was educated at the Dragon School in Oxford, and at the Nautical College, Pangbourne, where he distinguished himself as chief cadet captain, captain of fencing, and playing on the rugby First XV.

== Military career ==
Having attended the Britannia Royal Naval College, White was commissioned into the Royal Navy in 1960.

He was appointed commanding officer of the submarine, HMS Oracle, in 1970 and then went to teach at the Britannia Royal Naval College in 1971. He went on to be commander, Submarine Sea Training in 1973 and commanding officer of the frigate, HMS Salisbury, in 1975 during the Cod Wars. He was made captain, naval plans, in 1978 and commanding officer of the frigate, HMS Avenger, as well as captain of the 4th Frigate Squadron in 1981 and served in the Falklands War. He went to work for the Chief of Defence Staff in 1982 and became commanding officer of the destroyer, HMS Bristol, in 1985.

He was appointed flag officer, Third Flotilla, and commander of the Anti-Submarine Warfare Striking Force in 1987. He became assistant chief of the naval staff in 1988 and flag officer, Scotland and Northern Ireland as well as commander Northern Atlantic in 1991. He went on to be Commander-in-Chief Fleet in 1992.

== Later life ==
White was appointed Governor of Gibraltar in 1995. He was also life president of the Type 21 Club Association.

He suffered a serious head injury in a fall in 2002, from which he made a gradual recovery but which impacted his later years. He died on 1 June 2014.

== Personal life ==
In 1966 he married Josephine Mary Lorimer Pedler, having met her on a P&O liner return journey from Australia; they had two sons.

Military offices
Preceded by Michael Livesay	Assistant Chief of the Naval Staff; 1988–1991	Succeeded by Peter Abbott
Preceded by Sir Michael Livesay	Flag Officer, Scotland and Northern Ireland; 1991–1992	Succeeded by Sir Christopher Morgan
Preceded by Sir Jock Slater	Commander-in-Chief Fleet; 1992–1995	Succeeded by Sir Peter Abbott
Government offices
Preceded by Sir John Chapple	Governor of Gibraltar; 1995–1997	Succeeded by Sir Richard Luce
