= Ernest Archer =

Ernest Archer may refer to:

- Ernest Archer (art director) (1910–1990), British art director
- Ernest Archer (Royal Navy officer) (1891–1958), British Royal Navy officer
