= Angus Cunninghame Graham =

Royal Navy Admiral (1893-1981)

Admiral Sir Angus Cunninghame Graham KBE CB FRGS
- Admiral Sir Angus Cunnnghame Graham KBE CB RN
- Born: 16 February 1893; London, England
- Died: 14 February 1981 (aged 87); Alexandria, Dunbartonshire
- Spouse(s): Mary Patricia, Lady Cunninghame Graham (née Hanbury; m. 1924)
- Children: Robert Elphinstone (b.1925) & Jean (b.1928)
- Relatives: Adm. Hon.Charles Elphinstone Fleeming RN MP (great-grandfather); Rt Rev Richard Bagot (great-grandfather); R.B. Cunninghame Graham MP (uncle); Cdr Charles E.- F. Cunninghame Graham, MVO RN, (father)
- Military career
- Allegiance: United Kingdom
- Branch: Royal Navy
- Service years: 1905–1951
- Rank: Admiral
- Commands: Senior Naval Officer, West River, China; HM Signal School; HMS Kent; Royal Navy Barracks, Chatham; 10th & 2nd Cruiser Squadrons; HM Dockyard, Rosyth; Flag Officer Scotland
- Conflicts: World War I Second Sino-Japanese War; World War II
- Awards: Knight Commander of the Order of the British Empire; Companion of the Order of the Bath; Commander of the Order of the British Empire

Admiral Sir Angus Edward Malise Bontine Cunninghame Graham of Gartmore and Ardoch KBE CB FRGS (16 February 1893 – 14 February 1981) was a Royal Navy officer who became Flag Officer, Scotland.

== Naval career ==
Educated at Ascham St. Vincent's School, Cunninghame Graham joined the Royal Navy in 1905 when he entered the RNC, Osborne. His tutors thought well of him and in 1907 he progressed to RNC Dartmouth where he continued to get good grades in everything except engineering. He completed his cadet training on HMS Cumberland and passed out as a midshipman in 1910. One of his first postings was to HMS Cochrane, which was one of the ships that escorted George V and Queen Mary to the Delhi Durbar of 1911. He was promoted to sub-lieutenant in 1912 and at the beginning of 1914 he was appointed to HM Yacht Victoria and Albert.

At the outbreak of World War I, all Royal Yachtsmen were transferred to two ships in the Grand Fleet, HMS Agincourt and HMS Erin. Cunninghame Graham served on HMS Agincourt and saw action at the Battle of Jutland in command of number 4 gun turret. He specialised in signals and was promoted to flag lieutenant in 1917.

After the war, he held a number of brief appointments, including a period as tutor at HM Signal School, before being appointed, despite his lowly rank, to HMS Iron Duke in the spring of 1922 as fleet signal officer of the Mediterranean Fleet, under the command of Admiral Sir Osmond Brock C-in-C. He gained the rank of lieutenant-commander in 1924 just prior to his marriage to Patricia Hanbury, the sister-in-law of Herbert Fitzherbert, the executive officer of the Iron Duke and was made a commander in 1928.

Cunninghame Graham had the unusual experience of attending all three staff colleges: Naval at Greenwich 1929–30; Army at Camberwell 1930–31; and Air Force at Andover 1934. Between 1931 and 1934, he served as executive officer on the cruiser HMS Cardiff on the South Africa station. He was appointed staff officer (operations and intelligence) at Nore Command in 1935. Having resigned himself, as had happened to his father, to remain a commander for the rest of his naval service, he was promoted to captain, at the last possible juncture under the batch system then in force, on 31 December 1935.

In January 1936, George V died and Cunninghame Graham, awaiting his first command, acted as aide-de-camp to Prince Paul of Greece during his visit to London for the state funeral. He was appointed in the autumn of 1936 to HMS Tarantula as senior naval officer on the West River in China. This was the time of the Second Sino-Japanese War. On his return from China, he was offered the post of captain of the "stone frigate" HMS President, which he declined, going on Half-pay at his own request from 14 April 1938 until 2 March 1939, when he was appointed captain of HM Signal School.

During World War II he held four commands. When war was declared he was serving as captain of HM Signal School, which also entailed being deputy to the commodore of Royal Naval Barracks, Portsmouth, and, thus, oversaw the research into the development of naval RDF.

His next appointment, in 1941, was as captain of the cruiser HMS Kent on the Russian convoys. HMS Kent was selected to carry a diplomatic party which included: H.E. Ivan M Maisky, the Soviet Ambassador; Rt Hon Anthony Eden, Secretary of State for Foreign Affairs; Sir Alexander Cadogan, Permanent Under-Secretary at the Foreign Office; and Lieutenant General Sir Archibald Nye, VCIGS, to Murmansk, from where they would travel by train to Moscow for talks with Stalin. As the diplomatic party were without any ciphering staff, it fell to Cunninghame Graham to inform the foreign secretary that the UK had declared war on Japan. In the autumn of 1942, he became flag-captain to Rear-Admiral Louis "Turtle" Hamilton, who had chosen to hoist his flag in HMS Kent.

In August 1943, he was promoted to commodore (2nd class) in charge of the Royal Naval Barracks, Chatham, in command of 20,000 officers, men and women with a daily turnover of 1,000. Also during this time, he was an aide-de-camp to the King (his father had been a groom-in-waiting to Edward VII and an equerry to George V) and was appointed a CBE in the 1944 New Year's Honours List. In January 1945, there came a second promotion to rear-admiral in command of the 10th Cruiser Squadron, and second in command of the Home Fleet, hoisting his flag first in HMS Diadem and then in HMS Birmingham.

After the war he continued to command the 10th Cruiser Squadron (later 2nd Cruiser Squadron with his flag in HMS Superb), during which time he took part in the victory celebrations in the Netherlands and had the honour of having Princess Juliana and Prince Bernhardt as dinner guests; he was also dispatched to Sweden on an official goodwill visit, being granted a private audience with King Gustav V.

In 1947, he became admiral superintendent at HM Dockyard, Rosyth., receiving a CB, and was promoted to vice admiral a year later. He was appointed Flag Officer, Scotland in 1950. He was advanced to KBE in the 1951 New Year Honours and retired in October of the same year. He was appointed a Deputy Lieutenant for the County of Dumabarton on 4 March 1952, and received his final promotion to admiral on 15 March of the same year.

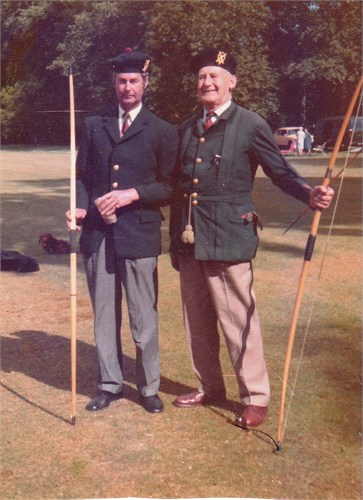
Robert & Angus Cunninghame Graham in Archers uniform

In retirement he made history by becoming Lord Lieutenant of Dunbartonshire and Keeper of Dumbarton Castle, neither post having ever been held before by a naval officer, in mark of which, in 1985, his widow donated his uniform and medals to the castle, where they are on public display.

He donated his papers (1913–1980) to Churchill College, Cambridge, and his naval archive (covering the 18th, 19th and 20th centuries) to the University of California, Irvine.

== Family ==
Born in Chelsea, Angus was the second child and only son of Commander Charles Elphinstone-Fleeming Cunninghame Graham MVO RN and Mildred Emily Barbara, daughter of Charles Walter Bagot, Rector of Castle Rising, Norfolk. He was baptised on 25 March 1893 in Holy Trinity, Chelsea, having Albert Edward, Prince of Wales (later Edward VII) as his godfather and Princess Louise, Duchess of Fife (later the Princess Royal), as his godmother. This led to his attending the coronation of Edward VII as page to the Duke of Fife, for which he was awarded the 1902 Coronation Medal.

In October 1924, he married Mary Patricia, the youngest daughter of banker, Col Lionel Hanbury of Hitcham House CMG, VD High Sheriff of the County of London (1920–21); they had one son, Robert Elphinstone, who followed his father into the Royal Navy; and one daughter, Jean, who first married Charles Jauncey of Tullichettle and secondly Harry Polwarth. He had seven grandchildren. He was the only nephew and heir of Robert Bontine Cunninghame Graham, a Scottish author and politician, and was his literary executor.

== Arms ==
Coat of arms of Angus Cunninghame Graham of Gartmore & Ardoch
Notes image digitally created for W R B Cunninghame Graham of Gartmore by Lubodrag Gujic Crest On a wreath of his liveries, an eagle displayed, in his dexter talon a sword in pale Proper. Helm a knight's helmet resting on a chapeau of maintenance Gules and ermined Escutcheon Quarterly, 1st and 4th: Or, a pale Gules, charged with a crescent Argent, on a chief Sable, three escallops of the First (Graham); 2nd : Or, a fesse chequy Azure and Argent, in chief a chevron Gules (Stewart, Earl of Strathern); 3rd : Argent a shakefork Sable (Cunninghame, Earl of Glencairn). Supporters Two lions rampant guardant Proper, armed and langued Gules. Motto For right and reason

Military offices
Preceded by Sir Ernest Archer	Flag Officer, Scotland; 1950–1951	Succeeded by John Crombie
Honorary titles
Preceded by Alexander Telfer-Smollett	Lord Lieutenant of Dunbartonshire; 1955–1968	Succeeded by Robert Arbuthnott
Preceded by Alexander Telfer-Smollett	Keeper of Dumbarton Castle; 1955-1981	Succeeded by Jock Pearson
