= David Gregory (Royal Navy officer) =

Royal Navy Vice-Admiral (1909-1975)

Vice-Admiral Sir David Gregory KBE CB DSO*
- Born: 8 October 1909; Perth, Scotland
- Died: 21 March 1975 (aged 65); Alyth, Scotland
- Military career
- Allegiance: United Kingdom
- Branch: Royal Navy
- Service years: 1923–1966
- Rank: Vice-Admiral
- Commands: Scotland and Northern Ireland (1964–66); Admiral Superintendent HMNB Devonport (1960–64); Commodore-in-Charge, HMNB Hong Kong (1957–60); 2nd Submarine Flotilla (1954–55); HMS Maidstone (1954–55); HMS Constance (1945–46); HMS Traveller (1941–42); HMS Sturgeon (1938–40)
- Conflicts: Second World War
- Awards: Knight Commander of the Order of the British Empire; Companion of the Order of the Bath; Distinguished Service Order & Bar; Mentioned in Despatches

Vice-Admiral Sir George David Archibald Gregory, KBE, CB, DSO* (8 October 1909 – 21 March 1975) was a Royal Navy officer who became Flag Officer, Scotland and Northern Ireland.

== Naval career ==
Gregory became a sub-lieutenant in the Royal Navy in 1930. He served in the Second World War as Commanding Officer of the submarines HMS Sturgeon and HMS Traveller and the destroyer HMS Constance. In a single action in September 1940 HMS Sturgeon torpedoed an enemy transport ship with the loss of 4,000 German troops. He was appointed Commodore-in-Charge, Hong Kong from March 1957 to April 1960. He was next appointed Admiral-Superintendent, Devonport in 1960, and Flag Officer, Scotland and Northern Ireland in 1964 before retiring in 1966.

Military offices
Preceded by Sir Arthur Hezlet	Flag Officer, Scotland and Northern Ireland; 1964–1966	Succeeded by Sir John Hayes
