= John Weale =

John Weale may refer to:

- John Weale (publisher)
- John Weale (Royal Navy officer)
