= John Hayes (Royal Navy officer, born 1913) =

Vice-Admiral Sir John Hayes KCB OBE DL
- Born: 9 May 1913; Southcote, Paget Parish, Bermuda
- Died: 7 September 1998 (aged 85)
- Military career
- Allegiance: United Kingdom
- Branch: Royal Navy
- Service years: 1927–1968
- Rank: Vice-Admiral
- Conflicts: World War II
- Awards: Knight Commander of the Order of the Bath; Officer of the Order of the British Empire

Vice-Admiral Sir John Osler Chattock Hayes KCB OBE DL (9 May 1913 – 7 September 1998) was a Royal Navy officer who became Naval Secretary.

== Naval career ==
Educated at the Royal Naval College Dartmouth, Hayes joined the Royal Navy in 1927. He served in World War II as a Navigation Officer on HMS Repulse and survived her sinking by Japanese air attack in December 1941. He then became naval liaison officer to the 2nd Battalion, the Argyll and Sutherland Highlanders and was present at the surrender of Singapore and in February 1942 and then saw the disintegration of Convoy PQ 17 on its way to Russia as 23 of its 36 ships were lost in July 1942.

He was appointed Captain at the Training Establishment HMS St Vincent in 1955. He became Commodore at the Royal Naval Barracks at Devonport in 1960 and Naval Secretary in 1962 before becoming Flag Officer (Flotillas) for the Home Fleet in 1964. Following promotion to vice admiral on 29 September 1965, he was appointed Flag Officer, Scotland and Northern Ireland in 1966. He retired in 1968.

In retirement he was appointed Chairman of the Cromarty Firth Port Authority. He also became Lord Lieutenant of Ross and Cromarty.

== Family ==
In 1939 he married The Hon Rosalind Finlay, daughter of William Finlay, 2nd Viscount Finlay; they had two sons and one daughter.

Military offices
Preceded by Frank Twiss	Naval Secretary; 1962–1964	Succeeded by William O'Brien
Preceded by Sir David Gregory	Flag Officer, Scotland and Northern Ireland; 1966–1968	Succeeded by Sir Ian McGeoch
