= Jock Slater =

Royal Navy Admiral (born 1938)

Admiral Sir Jock Slater GCB LVO DL
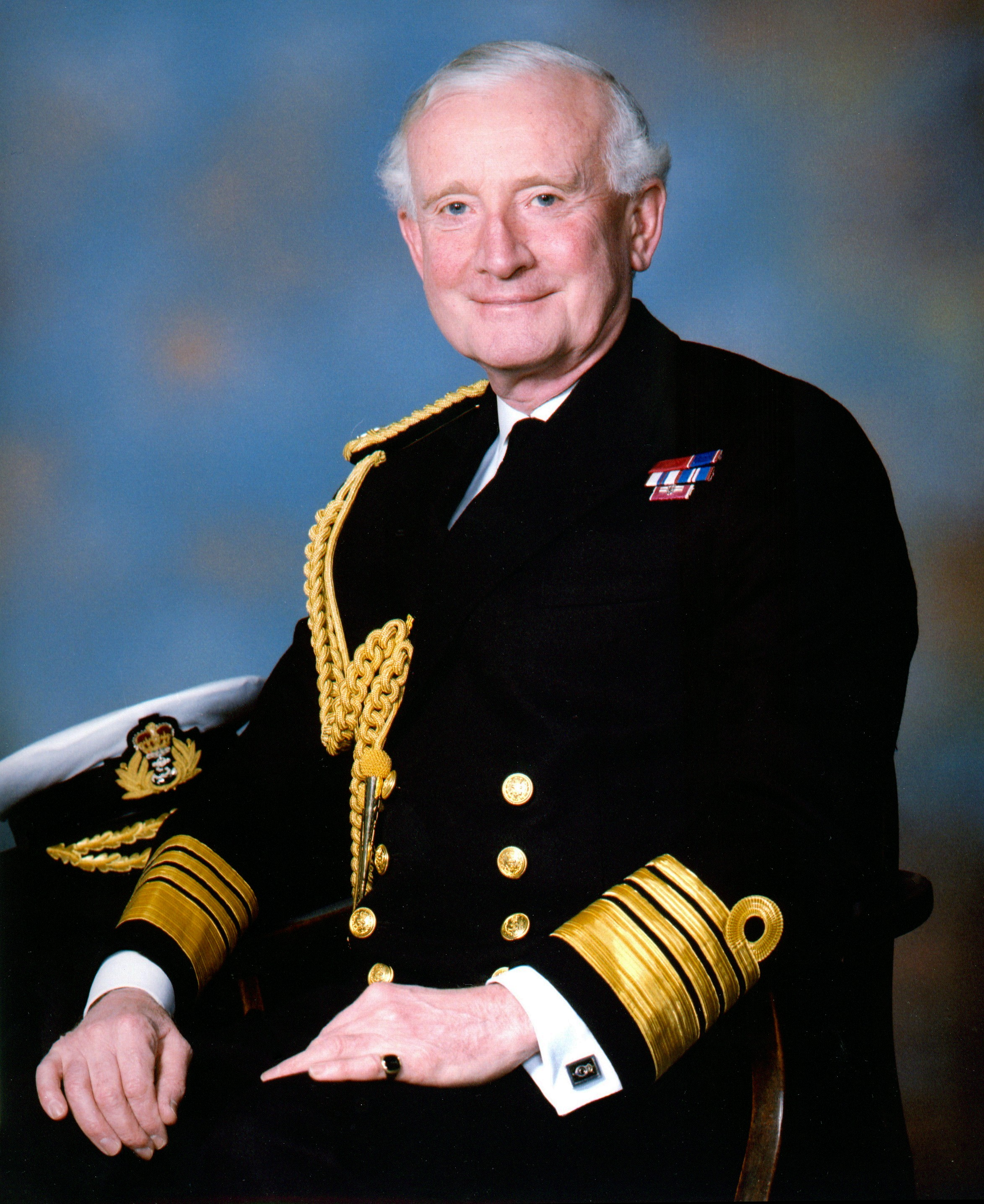
- Born: 27 March 1938 (age 88)
- Military career
- Allegiance: United Kingdom
- Branch: Royal Navy
- Service years: 1958–1998
- Rank: Admiral
- Commands: First Sea Lord; Vice-Chief of the Defence Staff; Commander-in-Chief Fleet; Flag Officer Scotland and Northern Ireland; HMS Dryad; HMS Illustrious; HMS Kent; HMS Jupiter; HMS Soberton
- Conflicts: Falklands War
- Awards: Knight Grand Cross of the Order of the Bath; Lieutenant of the Royal Victorian Order; Legion of Merit (United States)

Admiral Sir John Cunningham Kirkwood Slater, GCB, LVO, DL (born 27 March 1938), known as Jock Slater, is a retired Royal Navy officer. He commanded a minesweeper, a frigate and then a destroyer before taking over the aircraft carrier HMS Illustrious and then achieving higher command in the Navy. He served as First Sea Lord and Chief of the Naval Staff from 1995 to 1998: in that capacity he played a key role in the 1998 Strategic Defence Review carried out by the Labour Government that had come to power a year earlier.

== Early life ==
Slater was the son of James Kirkwood Slater and Margaret Claire Byrom Bramwell, daughter of Dr Edwin Bramwell.

Slater was educated in his early years at the Edinburgh Academy before attending Sedbergh School and the Royal Naval College, Dartmouth. Slater is a great nephew of Admiral of the Fleet The Viscount Cunningham of Hyndhope who served as First Sea Lord during the Second World War.

== Naval career ==
Slater joined the Royal Navy as a cadet in 1956 and was confirmed in the rank of sub lieutenant on 1 January 1959. During his early career he served in the destroyer HMS Troubridge, the minesweeper HMS Yaxham, the Royal Yacht HMY Britannia and the destroyer HMS Cassandra. In 1965 he was given command of the minesweeper HMS Soberton, which he commanded on fishery protection duties, before specialising in navigation. He was posted to the shore establishment HMS Dryad later that year and then served in the aircraft carrier HMS Victorious and then the frigate HMS Scarborough over the next two years.

Slater became an Equerry to the Queen on 12 October 1968 and, having been promoted to lieutenant commander on 22 October 1968, his services were recognised when he was made a Lieutenant of the Royal Victorian Order on 15 October 1971. Following promotion to commander on 31 December 1971, he was given command of the frigate HMS Jupiter in 1972. He was posted to the Directorate of Naval Operations at the Ministry of Defence in 1973 and, following promotion to captain on 30 June 1976, he was given command of the destroyer HMS Kent in August of that year. He attended the Royal College of Defence Studies in 1978 and then became assistant director of Naval Warfare at the Ministry of Defence in 1979. He went on to become the first commanding officer of the aircraft carrier HMS Illustrious in May 1981 and then became Captain at the School of Maritime Operations and Commander of HMS Dryad in July 1983.

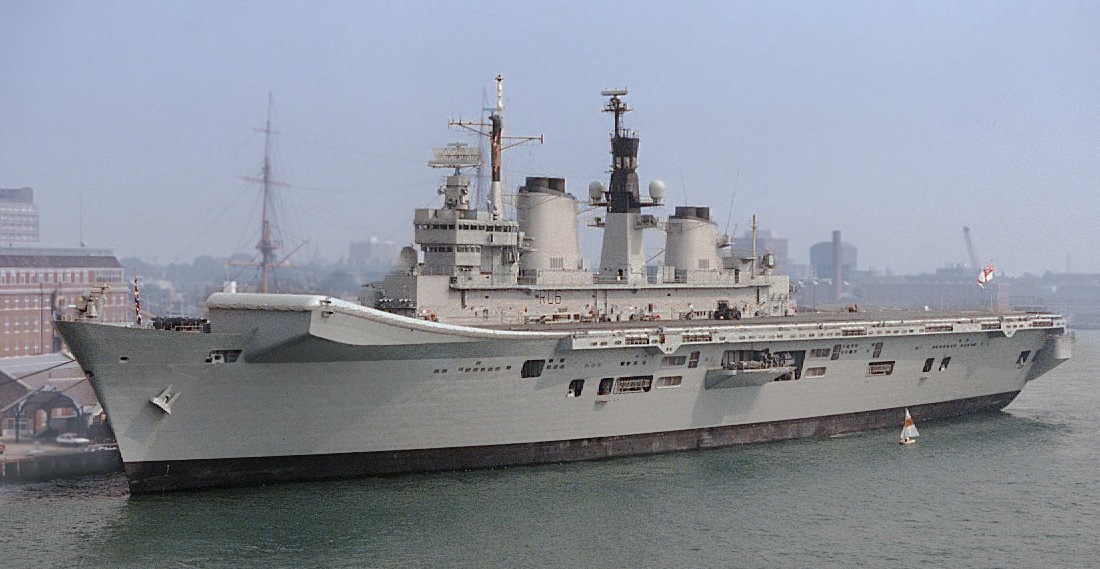
The aircraft carrier HMS Illustrious which Slater commanded in the early 1980s

Slater was promoted to rear admiral on 18 June 1985, on appointment as Assistant Chief of the Defence Staff (Policy and Nuclear), and then promoted to vice admiral on 20 October 1987, on appointment as Flag Officer Scotland and Northern Ireland as well as NATO Commander Northern Sub-Area Eastern Atlantic, NATO Commander Nore Sub-Area Channel and Commander HM Naval Base Rosyth. Appointed a Knight Commander of the Order of the Bath in the 1988 Birthday Honours, he went on to be Chief of Fleet Support in March 1989. He was promoted to full admiral on appointment as Commander-in-Chief Fleet as well as NATO Commander-in-Chief, Channel and Commander-in-Chief, Eastern Atlantic in January 1991. Advanced to Knight Grand Cross of the Order of the Bath in the 1992 Birthday Honours, he became Vice-Chief of the Defence Staff in January 1993.

Slater was appointed First Sea Lord and Chief of the Naval Staff in July 1995. In that capacity he played a key role in the Strategic Defence Review carried out by the incoming Labour Government. He retired in December 1998.

In 2025 Peter Hore published Slater's biography "No Uncertain Sound: The Life and Times of Admiral Sir Jock Slater".

== Later career ==
In retirement Slater has served as a Non-Executive Director of VT Group and of Lockheed Martin UK. He has also been Chairman of the executive committee of the Royal National Lifeboat Institution, Chairman of the Royal Navy Club of 1765 & 1785, Chairman of the Trustees of the Imperial War Museum and Chairman of the Council of Management of the White Ensign Association. He has been a Deputy Lieutenant of Hampshire, an Elder Brother of Trinity House, a Prime Warden of the Shipwrights' Company, and a Freeman of the City of London. His other interests mostly include outdoor activities.

== Family ==
In 1972 Slater married Ann Frances, daughter of William Scott OBE DL, by whom he has two sons (Charles and Rory).

Military offices
Preceded by Sir George Vallings	Flag Officer, Scotland and Northern Ireland; 1987–1989	Succeeded by Sir Michael Livesay
Preceded by Sir Benjamin Bathurst	Chief of Fleet Support; 1989–1991	Succeeded by Sir Neville Purvis
Preceded by Sir Benjamin Bathurst	Commander-in-Chief Fleet; 1991–1992	Succeeded by Sir Hugo White
Preceded by Sir Benjamin Bathurst	Vice-Chief of the Defence Staff; 1993–1995	Succeeded by Sir John Willis
Preceded by Sir Benjamin Bathurst	First Sea Lord; 1995–1998	Succeeded by Sir Michael Boyce
Honorary titles
Preceded by Sir Joseph Gilbert	Chairman Board of Trustees, Imperial War Museum; 2001–2006	Succeeded by Sir Peter Squire
