= Martin Alabaster =

Royal Navy Read-Admiral (born 1958)

Rear Admiral Martin Alabaster CBE
- Born: 10 August 1958 (age 68); Totnes, Devon
- Education: Britannia Royal Naval College; Queens' College, Cambridge; University of Southampton Dulwich College
- Military career
- Allegiance: United Kingdom
- Branch: Royal Navy
- Service years: 1977–2011
- Rank: Rear Admiral
- Commands: Britannia Royal Naval College; Flag Officer Scotland, Northern England, Northern Ireland (FOSNNI) and Flag Officer Reserves

Rear Admiral Martin Brian Alabaster CBE (born 10 August 1958) is a retired senior officer in the British Royal Navy.

== Early life ==
Alabaster spent his early years in Devon, Pembrokeshire and Hampshire but for the majority of his upbringing lived in south London. There, he attended Dulwich College. He later joined the Royal Navy and entered Britannia Royal Naval College in Dartmouth, at the rank of Midshipman in January 1977. Martin completed his Naval General Training, and then went up to Queens' College, Cambridge to read Engineering.

== Naval career ==
Alabaster took up his first sea appointment as the Weapons Section Officer in HMS Bristol. He later attained an MSc in Electronics at Southampton University and then became the Project Manager for Seawolf missile development. He also returned to the Britannia Royal Naval College as a Senior Divisional Officer. Whilst in the rank of Commander, he spent some time in HMS London as the Weapon Engineering Officer as well as acting as Naval Assistant to the Chief of Fleet Support.

His promotion to captain saw him in the role of Assistant Director of Combat Systems, Communications and Electronic Warfare and he became the first Director of Equipment Capability. In 2001 he became a member of the Royal College of Defence Studies. He was promoted to Commodore and spent three years in the Defence Procurement Agency in Abbey Wood as the Head of Project Management. He then spent a further two years in the Fleet Headquarters as Assistant Chief of Staff (Engineering), responsible for all aspects of engineering and safety in ships, submarines, aircraft and establishments of the Fleet Command. He then once again returned to Britannia Royal Naval College, Dartmouth, as commander of the facility. He left this role when he was promoted in September 2008 to Flag Officer Scotland, Northern England and Northern Ireland (FOSNNI) and Flag Officer Reserves, stationed in HM Naval Base Clyde. This position made him the Royal Navy's senior officer in Scotland with representational duties everywhere north of the M4. As Flag Officer Reserves he commands the Royal Naval and Royal Marines Reserves. He was appointed CBE on 11 June 2011. He then retired from service on 3 January 2012.

== Personal life ==
Martin Alabaster married Moira Bain, a professional violinist and viola player, with whom he has two children, Hugh (born 1995) and Maddy (born 1997). His residence is in Bradford-on-Avon, in Wiltshire.

Military offices
| Preceded by Timothy Harris | Commander of Royal Naval College, Dartmouth; April 2007-September 2008 | Succeeded by John K. Moores |
| Preceded by Sir Philip Jones | Flag Officer Scotland, Northern England and Northern Ireland; September 2008–September 2011 | Succeeded by Christopher Hockley |
