= Lord Lieutenant of Dunbartonshire =

Ceremonial officer in Dunbartonshire, Scotland

This is a list of people who have served as Lord Lieutenant of Dunbartonshire. Before the twentieth century, the county was spelled Dumbartonshire.

- John Elphinstone, 11th Lord Elphinstone (17 March 1794 – 19 August 1799)
- John Elphinstone, 12th Lord Elphinstone (19 November 1799 – 20 May 1813)
- James Graham, 3rd Duke of Montrose (10 July 1813 – 30 December 1836)
- Sir James Colquhoun, 4th Baronet, of Luss (14 January 1837 – 18 December 1873)
- Humphrey Ewing Crum-Ewing (23 February 1874 – 3 July 1887)
- Sir James Colquhoun, 5th Baronet (24 August 1887 – 13 March 1907)
- John White, 1st Baron Overtoun (13 April 1907 – 15 February 1908)
- James Burns, 3rd Baron Inverclyde (21 May 1908 – 16 August 1919)
- Sir Iain Colquhoun, 7th Baronet (4 November 1919 – 12 November 1948)
- Maj. Gen. Alexander Telfer-Smollett (2 February 1949 – 9 October 1954)
- Admiral Sir Angus Cunninghame Graham (5 January 1955 – 14 February 1968)
- Robert Arbuthnott (14 May 1968 – 1975)
- James Cassels Robertson (1 December 1975 – 9 December 1978)
- Alastair Pearson (20 June 1979 – 1990)
- Donald Hardie (16 August 1990 – 2007)
- Donald Ross (6 March 2007 – 2008)
- Michael Gregory (October 2008–August 2020)
- Jill Young (12 August 2020 – incumbent)
