= MV Powerful =

Danish cargo ship attempted piracy 2008

History

Denmark
- Name: Powerful
- Owner: Excel Maritime Carriers Ltd., Greece
- Port of registry: Denmark
- Builder: China
- Launched: 4 September 1993
- Completed: 1994
- Acquired: 13 April 2005
- Identification: IMO number: 9042233
- Captured: Hijacking attempt thwarted, 11 November 2008
- Fate: Scrapped 21 January 2015

General characteristics
- Type: Panamax dry bulk carrier
- Tonnage: 70,000 DWT

MV Powerful is a Danish-flagged cargo ship owned by Excel Maritime Carriers Ltd. of Greece. It was attacked with the intention of hijack by Somali pirates using assault rifles on 11 November 2008 in the Gulf of Aden off the Horn of Africa. Its capture was thwarted by the Royal Marines of the British frigate, HMS Cumberland, as well as the crew of a Russian Neustrashimy-class frigate.

The 11 November 2008 incident off Somalia's coast occurred 60 nautical miles (110 km; 69 mi) south of the Yemeni coast, in the Gulf of Aden. The pirates approached the vessel in a dhow, but were repelled by helicopters from the British and possibly Russian ships. The dhow was later detected by the Cumberland, and a unit of Royal Marines gave chase in a rigid craft. The pirates fired upon the Marines; the Marines returned fire and killed two pirates. The remaining pirates surrendered and one additional pirate died of injuries sustained in the conflict. The engagement was attributed to Operation Enduring Freedom - Horn of Africa and was described by The Times as "the first time the Royal Navy had been engaged in a fatal shoot-out on the high seas in living memory."

== See also ==
- Piracy in Somalia
