= Christopher Hockley =

Royal Navy officer

Rear Admiral Christopher Hockley CBE DL
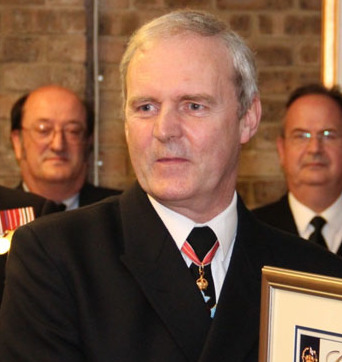
- Hockley in 2014
- Born: 24 August 1959 (age 67); Orpington, London, England
- Military career
- Allegiance: United Kingdom
- Branch: Royal Navy
- Service years: 1979–2014
- Rank: Rear Admiral
- Commands: Scotland, Northern England and Northern Ireland; HMNB Clyde
- Conflicts: Gulf War
- Awards: Commander of the Order of the British Empire

Rear Admiral Christopher John Hockley CBE DL (born 24 August 1959) is a retired Royal Navy officer who was Flag Officer Scotland, Northern England and Northern Ireland from September 2011 to November 2014.

== Naval career ==
Educated at Dulwich College, Hockley joined the Royal Navy in 1979 and subsequently specialised in engineering. He was appointed Deputy Team Leader for the Future Aircraft Carrier Project in 1999, Military Assistant to the Chief of Defence Procurement in 2002 and Through Life Support Director at the Defence Logistics Organisation in 2005. He was made base commander at HMNB Clyde in October 2007, and became Flag Officer, Scotland, Northern England and Northern Ireland in the rank of rear admiral in September 2011.

Hockley was appointed Commander of the Order of the British Empire (CBE) in the 2014 New Year Honours and is a Deputy Lieutenant of Aberdeenshire.

Military offices
Preceded by Martin Alabaster	Flag Officer Scotland, Northern England and Northern Ireland; 2011–2014	Succeeded by John Clink
