= Donald Hardie =

Scottish businessman (born 1936)

Brigadier Donald David Graeme Hardie CVO TD KStJ (born 23 January 1936) is a Scottish businessman and retired Territorial Army officer. He was Lord Lieutenant of Dunbartonshire from 1990 to 2007. He is also an honorary vice-president of Lennox and Argyll Battalion of the Boys' Brigade, and is the Keeper of Dumbarton Castle.

Hardie was appointed Commander of the Royal Victorian Order (CVO) in 2008.

Honorary titles
| Preceded by Brig. Alastair Pearson OBE | Lord Lieutenant of Dunbartonshire; 1990–2007 | Succeeded by Col. Donald Ross OBE |
