= John Crombie (Royal Navy officer) =

Scottish Royal Navy officer

Rear-Admiral John Crombie CB DSO
- Born: John Harvey Forbes Crombie; 16 February 1900; Edinburgh, Scotland
- Died: 31 August 1972 (aged 72); Edinburgh, Scotland
- Military career
- Allegiance: United Kingdom
- Branch: Royal Navy
- Service years: 1913–1953
- Rank: Rear-Admiral
- Commands: HMS Vengeance; Royal Navy Signal School; Scotland and Northern Ireland
- Conflicts: First World War; Second World War
- Awards: Companion of the Order of the Bath; Distinguished Service Order

Rear-Admiral John Harvey Forbes Crombie CB DSO (16 February 1900 – 31 August 1972) was a Scottish Royal Navy officer who became Flag Officer, Scotland and Northern Ireland.

== Naval career ==
Crombie joined the Royal Navy in 1913. He served in World War I in the battleship HMS Queen Elizabeth and then in the destroyer HMS Oak. He also served in the Second World War as Commanding Officer of the minesweeper HMS Bramble, as Senior Officer for Minesweepers in the White Sea and then as Director of Minesweeping at the Admiralty from 1943. After the War he became Commanding Officer of the aircraft carrier HMS Vengeance before taking over command of the HMS Mercury Royal Navy Signal School in 1948. He became Flag Officer, Scotland and Northern Ireland in 1951 and retired in 1953.

== Family ==
He married Rosamund, daughter of Brigadier-General Rodney Style. Their daughter Julia Rosamond Crombie (b. August 1947) married, in 1974, John Algernon Henry Trotter of Mordington House, Berwickshire.

Military offices
Preceded by Sir Angus Cunninghame Graham	Flag Officer, Scotland and Northern Ireland; 1951–1953	Succeeded by Sir Geoffrey Robson
