= Evelyn Thomson =

Vice-Admiral Evelyn Thomson CB DSO
- Born: 13 April 1884
- Died: 21 December 1942 (aged 57)
- Military career
- Allegiance: United Kingdom
- Branch: Royal Navy
- Service years: 1899–1939
- Rank: Vice-Admiral
- Commands: HMS Petard; 3rd Destroyer Flotilla; HMS St Vincent; Home Fleet Destroyer Flotillas; Coast of Scotland
- Conflicts: World War I
- Awards: Companion of the Order of the Bath; Distinguished Service Order

Vice-Admiral Evelyn Claude Ogilvie Thomson CB DSO (13 April 1884 – 21 December 1942) was a Royal Navy officer who became Commander-in-Chief, Coast of Scotland.

His grave is at Abdie Churchyard, Fife.

== Naval career ==
Thomson joined the Royal Navy as a cadet in 1899. He served in World War I and commanded the destroyer HMS Petard at the Battle of Jutland. He was appointed Commander of the 3rd Destroyer Flotilla in 1926, Captain-in-charge in Singapore in 1929 and Commander of the boys' training establishment HMS St Vincent in Gosport in 1932. He went on to be Commander of the Home Fleet Destroyer Flotillas in 1935 and Commander-in-Chief, Coast of Scotland in 1937. He retired in 1939.

== Family ==
In 1918 he married Agnes Motherwell Wilson.

Military offices
Preceded by Robert Davenport	Commander-in-Chief, Coast of Scotland; 1937–1939	Succeeded by Sir Charles Ramsey
