= Flag Officer Scotland and Northern Ireland =

Former senior post in the Royal Navy

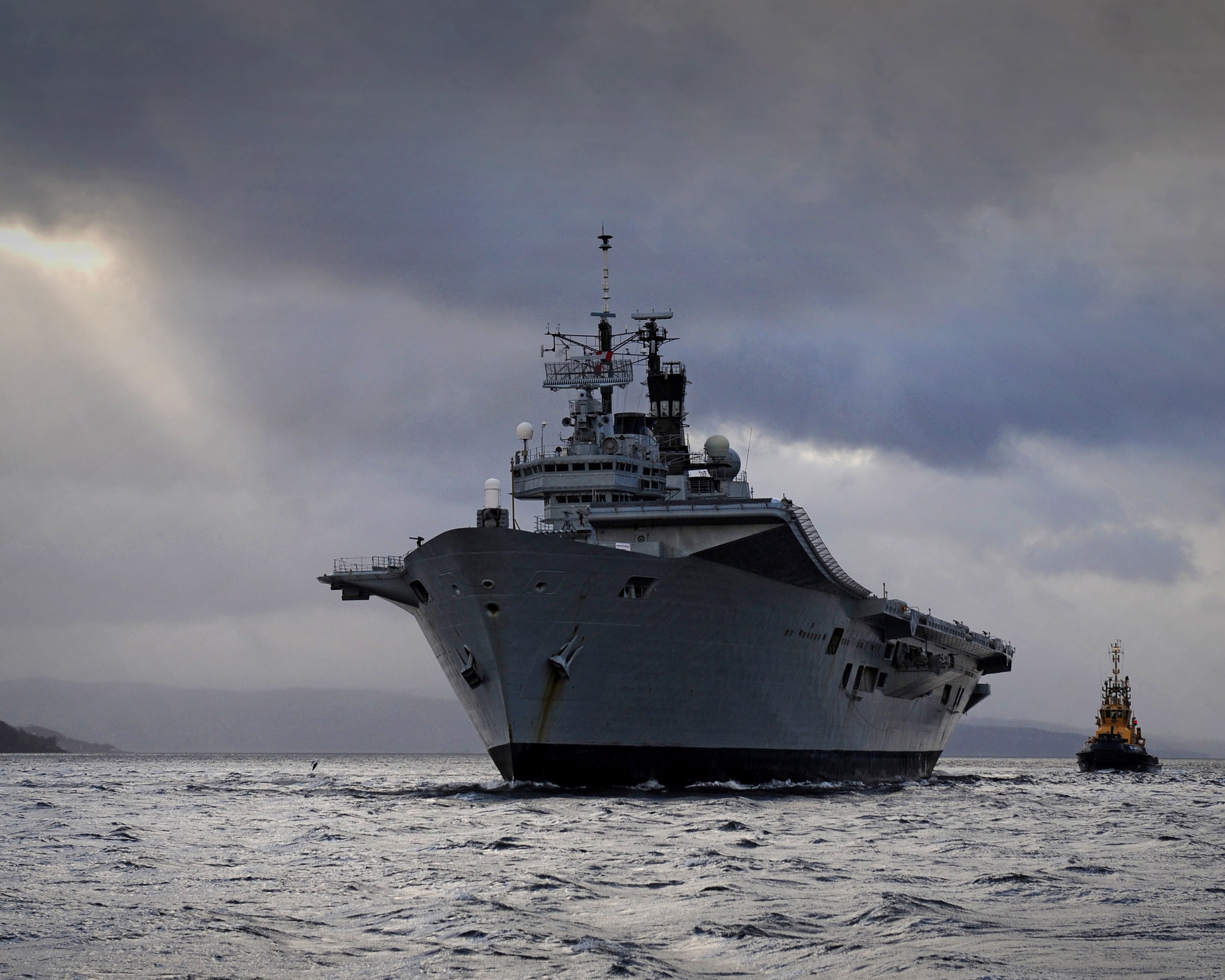
- HMS Ark Royal on the River Clyde
- Active: 1913–2020
- Country: United Kingdom
- Branch: Royal Navy
- Type: Command (military formation)
- Part of: Royal Navy
- Garrison/HQ: HM Naval Base Clyde

The Flag Officer Scotland and Northern Ireland (FOSNI) was a senior post in the Royal Navy of the United Kingdom. It was based at HM Naval Base Clyde, and the holder of the post was the Royal Navy's senior officer in Scotland. The post of FOSNI, dating from 1946, was re-scoped and re-named in 1994 to Flag Officer Scotland, Northern England & Northern Ireland (FOSNNI), then named back in 2015, before being dis-established in 2020.

== History ==
The Flag Officer Scotland and Northern Ireland was the most senior naval position in Scotland and is the successor to appointments starting with the Senior Officer on the Coast of Scotland, established in 1913, just prior to the outbreak of the First World War. The title was altered to Commander-in-Chief, Rosyth in 1916. From 1946 the post became the Flag Officer Scotland & Northern Ireland. Between 1961 and 1994 the Flag Officer Scotland and Northern Ireland was triple-hatted as Commander Northern Sub-Area (NORLANT) of Allied Command Atlantic (ACLANT), and as Commander Nore Sub-Area Channel (NORECHAN) of Allied Command Channel. Based at RAF Pitreavie Castle, NORECHAN was tasked to prevent Soviet Navy ships and submarines from entering the North Sea. Vice-Admiral Arthur Hezlet, commanding in 1961-64, flew his flag from the shore establishment HMS Cochrane at Rosyth.

When the command moved from Rosyth to HMNB Clyde in 1994, it took responsibility for a larger area, becoming the Flag Officer Scotland, Northern England and Northern Ireland. In 2015 the post reverted to Flag Officer Scotland and Northern Ireland. The post was removed under the Royal Navy's Navy Command Transformation Programme. The replacement post at Commodore level was Commodore Submarine Service (COSM).

Major subordinate naval bases ("stone frigates") under C-in-C Rosyth on the outbreak of the Second World War included HMS Flora at Invergordon; HMS Bacchante (a shore establishment) at Aberdeen, HMS Claverhouse at Leith, and HMS Calliope on the Tyne. Bacchante had been commanded by the Senior Naval Officer, Aberdeen from 1915 to 1919 and then the Flag Officer-in-Charge, Aberdeen from 1942 to 1945. Wartime subsidiary bases included Aultbea on Loch Ewe. Facilities at Aultbea were established in February 1915 during World War I and partially deactivated in April 1919. Aultbea was reactivated during World War II in 1940 following the German attack on Scapa Flow and subsequent sinking of HMS Royal Oak, when the Home Fleet was temporarily based there. It was also a staging point for arctic convoys that operated out of Loch Ewe. It remained in operation until October 1967.

== Admirals Commanding ==
Flag Officers have been:

=== Admiral Commanding on the Coast of Scotland; 1913–1916 ===
Included:

S.No	Name	Rank	Assumed office	Left office
1	Sir Robert Lowry	Admiral	July 1913	June 1916

=== Commander-in-Chief, Rosyth; 1913–1919 ===
S.No	Name	Rank	Assumed office	Left office
1	Sir Frederick Hamilton	Admiral	June 1916	October 1917
2	Sir Cecil Burney	Admiral	October 1917	March 1919

=== Commander-in-Chief, Coast of Scotland; 1919–1939 ===
S.No	Name	Rank	Assumed office	Left office
1	Sir Herbert Heath	Admiral	March 1919	April 1922
2	Sir John Green	Vice-Admiral	April 1922	June 1923
3	Sir Reginald Tyrwhitt, Bt.	Rear-Admiral	June 1923	June 1925
4	Sir Walter Cowan	Vice-Admiral	June 1925	June 1926
5	Humphrey Bowring	Rear-Admiral	June 1926	June 1928
6	John Cameron	Rear-Admiral	June 1928	July 1929
7	Theodore Hallett	Rear-Admiral	July 1929	July 1931
8	the Hon. William Leveson-Gower	Vice-Admiral	July 1931	July 1933
9	Everard Hardman-Jones	Rear-Admiral	July 1933	July 1935
10	Robert Davenport	Rear-Admiral	July 1935	July 1937
11	Evelyn Thomson	Vice-Admiral	July 1937	August 1939

=== Commander-in-Chief, Rosyth; 1939–1946 ===
S.No	Name	Rank	Assumed office	Left office
1	Sir Charles Ramsey	Admiral	August 1939	June 1942
2	Sir Wilbraham Ford	Admiral	June 1942	June 1944
3	Sir William Whitworth	Admiral	June 1944	July 1946

=== Flag Officer Scotland and Northern Ireland; 1946–1994 ===
S.No	Name	Rank	Assumed office	Left office
1	Sir Frederick Dalrymple-Hamilton	Admiral	July 1946	July 1948
2	Sir Ernest Archer	Vice-Admiral	July 1948	July 1950
3	Sir Angus Cunninghame Graham	Vice-Admiral	July 1950	August 1951
4	John Crombie	Rear-Admiral	August 1951	October 1953
5	Sir Geoffrey Robson	Vice-Admiral	October 1953	March 1956
6	Sir John Cuthbert	Vice-Admiral	March 1956	July 1958
7	David Luce	Vice-Admiral	July 1958	December 1959
8	Sir Royston Wright	Vice-Admiral	December 1959	September 1961
9	Sir Arthur Hezlet	Vice-Admiral	September 1961	June 1964
10	Sir David Gregory	Vice-Admiral	June 1964	July 1966
11	Sir John Hayes	Vice-Admiral	July 1966	July 1968
12	Sir Ian McGeoch	Vice-Admiral	July 1968	May 1970
13	David Dunbar-Nasmith	Rear-Admiral	May 1970	July 1972
14	Martin Lucey	Rear-Admiral	July 1972	August 1974
15	Sir Anthony Troup	Vice-Admiral	August 1974	June 1977
16	Sir Cameron Rusby	Vice-Admiral	June 1977	November 1979
17	Sir Thomas Baird	Vice-Admiral	November 1979	January 1982
18	Robert Squires	Vice-Admiral	January 1982	December 1983
19	Sir Nicholas Hunt	Vice-Admiral	December 1983	May 1985
20	Sir George Vallings	Vice-Admiral	May 1985	October 1987
21	Sir Jock Slater	Vice-Admiral	October 1987	February 1989
22	Sir Michael Livesay	Vice-Admiral	February 1989	March 1991
23	Sir Hugo White	Vice-Admiral	March 1991	November 1992
24	Sir Christopher Morgan	Vice-Admiral	November 1992	April 1996

=== Flag Officer Scotland, Northern England, Northern Ireland; 1994–2015 ===
Note: From 2005, the post holder also held the title of Flag Officer, Reserves and Flag Officer Regional Forces.

S.No	Name	Rank	Assumed office	Left office
1	John Tolhurst	Rear-Admiral	April 1996	September 1997
2	Michael Gregory	Rear-Admiral	September 1997	August 2000
3	Derek Anthony	Rear-Admiral	August 2000	May 2003
4	Nick Harris	Rear-Admiral	May 2003	April 2006
5	Philip Wilcocks	Rear-Admiral	April 2006	December 2006
6	Tony Johnstone-Burt	Rear-Admiral	December 2006	February 2008
7	Philip Jones	Rear-Admiral	February 2008	September 2008
8	Martin Alabaster	Rear Admiral	September 2008	September 2011
9	Christopher Hockley	Rear-Admiral	September 2011	August 2014
10	John Clink	Rear-Admiral	August 2014	July 2015

=== Flag Officer Scotland and Northern Ireland; 2015–2020 ===
S.No	Name	Rank	Assumed office	Left office
1	John Weale	Rear-Admiral	July 2015	May 2020
