= Michael Gregory (Royal Navy officer) =

Royal Navy Rear Admiral (born 1945)

Rear Admiral Michael Gregory CVO OBE
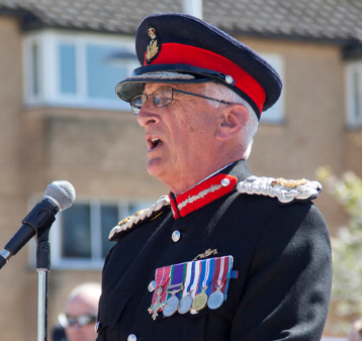
- Gregory in 2016
- Born: 15 December 1945 (age 80)
- Military career
- Allegiance: United Kingdom
- Branch: Royal Navy
- Service years: 1964–2000
- Rank: Rear Admiral
- Commands: Scotland, Northern England and Northern Ireland; HMS Cumberland
- Awards: Commander of the Royal Victorian Order; Officer of the Order of the British Empire

Rear Admiral Alexander Michael Gregory, CVO, OBE (born 15 December 1945) is a former Royal Navy officer who served as Flag Officer, Scotland, Northern England and Northern Ireland from 1997 to 2000.

== Naval career ==
Gregory joined the Royal Navy in 1964. After commanding three submarines, he became captain of the frigate, HMS Cumberland, in 1988. Following a tour as Assistant Director of Naval Staff Duties in the Ministry of Defence, he was made naval attaché in Washington D. C. in 1994 and Flag Officer, Scotland, Northern England and Northern Ireland in 1997, before retiring in 2000.

== Post-service career ==
In retirement, Gregory was made chief executive of the Mechanical and Metal Trades Confederation and then Chief Executive of the Energy Industries Council. He also became Lord Lieutenant of Dunbartonshire.

Gregory was appointed Commander of the Royal Victorian Order (CVO) in the 2020 Birthday Honours.

Military offices
Preceded by John Tolhurst	Flag Officer Scotland, Northern England and Northern Ireland; 1997–2000	Succeeded by Derek Anthony
Honorary titles
Preceded by Donald Ross	Lord Lieutenant of Dunbartonshire; 2008–2020	Succeeded by Jill Williamina Young
