= Everard Hardman-Jones =

Royal Navy admiral

Vice-Admiral Everard Hardman-Jones CB OBE
- Born: 15 October 1881; Binfield, Berkshire
- Died: 28 June 1962 (aged 80)
- Military career
- Allegiance: United Kingdom
- Branch: Royal Navy
- Service years: 1896–1944
- Rank: Vice-Admiral
- Commands: HMS Caledon; HMS Champion; HMS Furious; HMS Courageous; Coast of Scotland
- Conflicts: World War I World War II
- Awards: Companion of the Order of the Bath; Officer of the Order of the British Empire

Vice-Admiral Everard John Hardman-Jones, CB, OBE (15 October 1881 – 28 June 1962) was a Royal Navy officer who became Commander-in-Chief, Coast of Scotland.

== Naval career ==
Hardman-Jones joined the Royal Navy as a cadet in 1896, and was in February 1900 posted as a temporary midshipman to the cruiser Diadem serving in the Channel Fleet. He was confirmed in the rank of sub-lieutenant on 15 April 1901, and was posted to the sail training brig HMS Wanderer in late March 1902. Six months later, he was in early October 1902 posted to the destroyer HMS Lightning.

He served in World War I initially as Signals Officer to Earl Jellicoe in his capacity as Second-in-Command of the Grand Fleet. Promoted to captain in 1920, he became commanding officer of the cruiser HMS Caledon in 1919, the cruiser HMS Champion in 1923, the aircraft carrier HMS Furious in 1929 and the aircraft carrier HMS Courageous in 1930. He was appointed Commander-in-Chief, Coast of Scotland in 1933 and then served in World War II as Naval Officer-in-Charge at Newhaven before retiring in 1944.

== Family ==
In 1921 he married Lilian Ursula Vivian.

Military offices
Preceded by William Leveson-Gower	Commander-in-Chief, Coast of Scotland; 1933–1935	Succeeded by Robert Davenport
