= 15th (Scottish Volunteer) Parachute Battalion =

- Cap badge of the Parachute Regiment
- Country: United Kingdom
- Branch: British Army
- Type: Infantry
- Role: Airborne
- Size: Battalion
- Part of: 77th Indian Parachute Brigade; 44th Parachute Brigade
- Nickname: Red Devils

Commanders
- Notable commanders: Sir George Lea; Jock Pearson

Insignia
- DZ Flash

The 15th (Scottish Volunteer) Parachute Battalion was an airborne infantry battalion of the Parachute Regiment, originally raised as 15th (King's) Parachute Battalion by the British Army in World War II.

The 15th Parachute Battalion was formed in India during 1945 from the 1st Battalion the King's Regiment (Liverpool). Prior to this the 1st Battalion King's had been part of the Chindits special force and taken part in the second Chindit expedition, Operation Thursday, of 1944. It was assigned to the 77th Chindit Brigade, taking part in the Battle of Mogaung in June 1944. It then became part of the 44th Indian Airborne Division.

The war ended before the battalion was committed to any combat but a number of officers and sergeants parachuted into Japanese Prisoner of War Camps in Java, Sumatra, Bangkok and Singapore to provide aid to the prisoners. After the war, the battalion was reconverted to standard line infantry as the 1st King's Regiment (Liverpool).

During the Royal Indian Navy mutiny of February 1946, HMIS Hindustan was berthed at Karachi, and occupied by mutineers. When ordered to debark the mutineers refused, but finally surrendered after a brief firefight with the 15th (King's) Parachute Battalion, supported by four 75mm pack howitzers of C Troop, 159 Parachute Light Regiment, Royal Artillery.

== Territorial Army ==
The battalion was reformed by the Territorial Army in 1947 as the 15th (Scottish) Parachute Battalion (TA). In 1967 it was re-designated 15 PARA (SV) and came under command of the 44th Parachute Brigade.

In June 1974, Warrant Officer Class 2 John Gordon McRae became the first territorial to be awarded the Queen's Gallantry Medal. During a practice parachute jump from a C-130 the parachute of one of his men failed to open. The man crashed through McRae's rigging and as he did so McRae managed to keep a hold of him and they both descended safely on the one parachute.

During September 1974 the battalion suffered the highest loss of TA soldiers during a major NATO exercise. Dropped off course, six men landed in the Kiel Canal and drowned. Defence cuts in April 1993 resulted in the amalgamation of the three remaining TA parachute battalions. The battalion numbered 4th Battalion, Parachute Regiment, retained as a rifle company 15 Company, subsequently re-designated A Company based in Scotland.

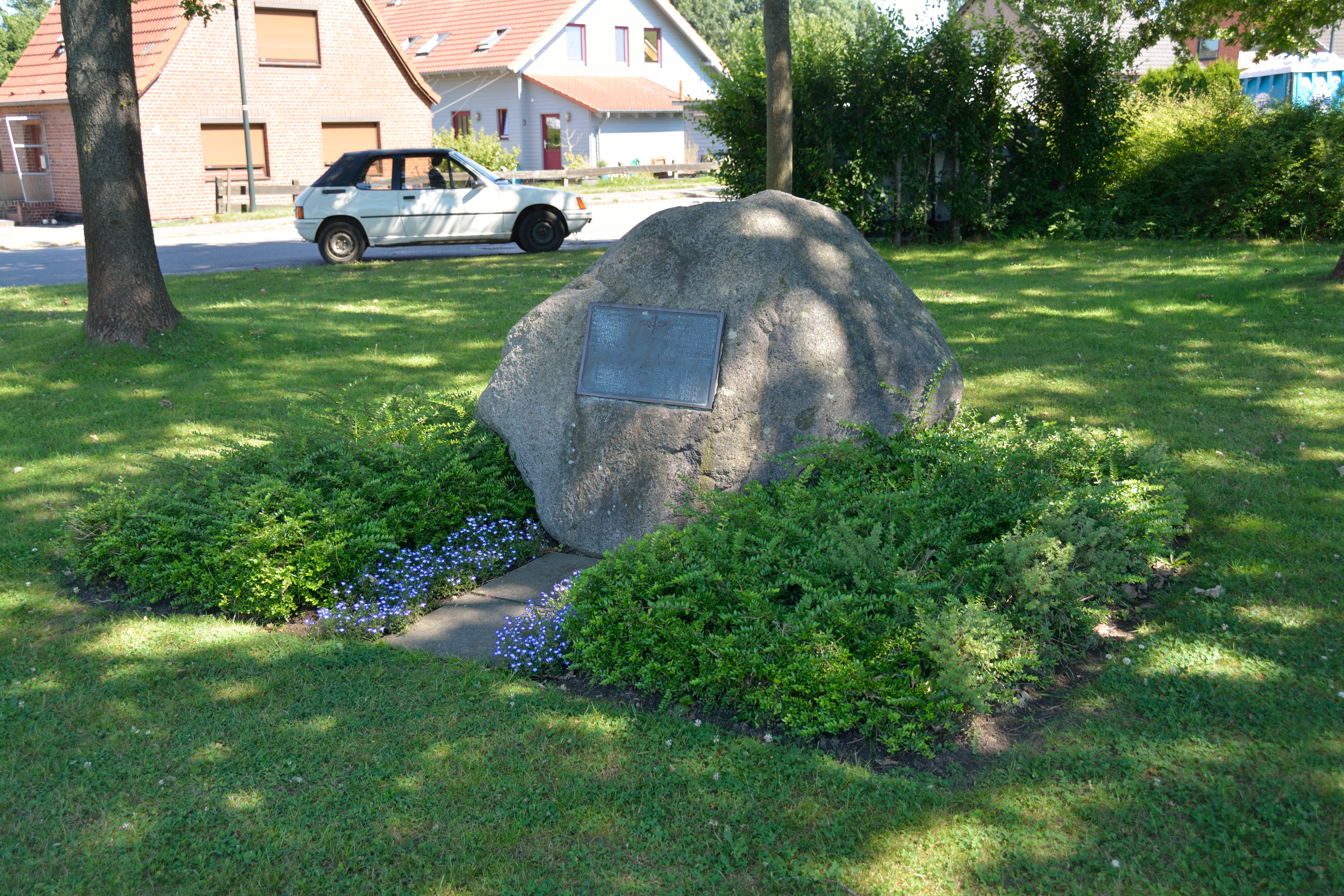

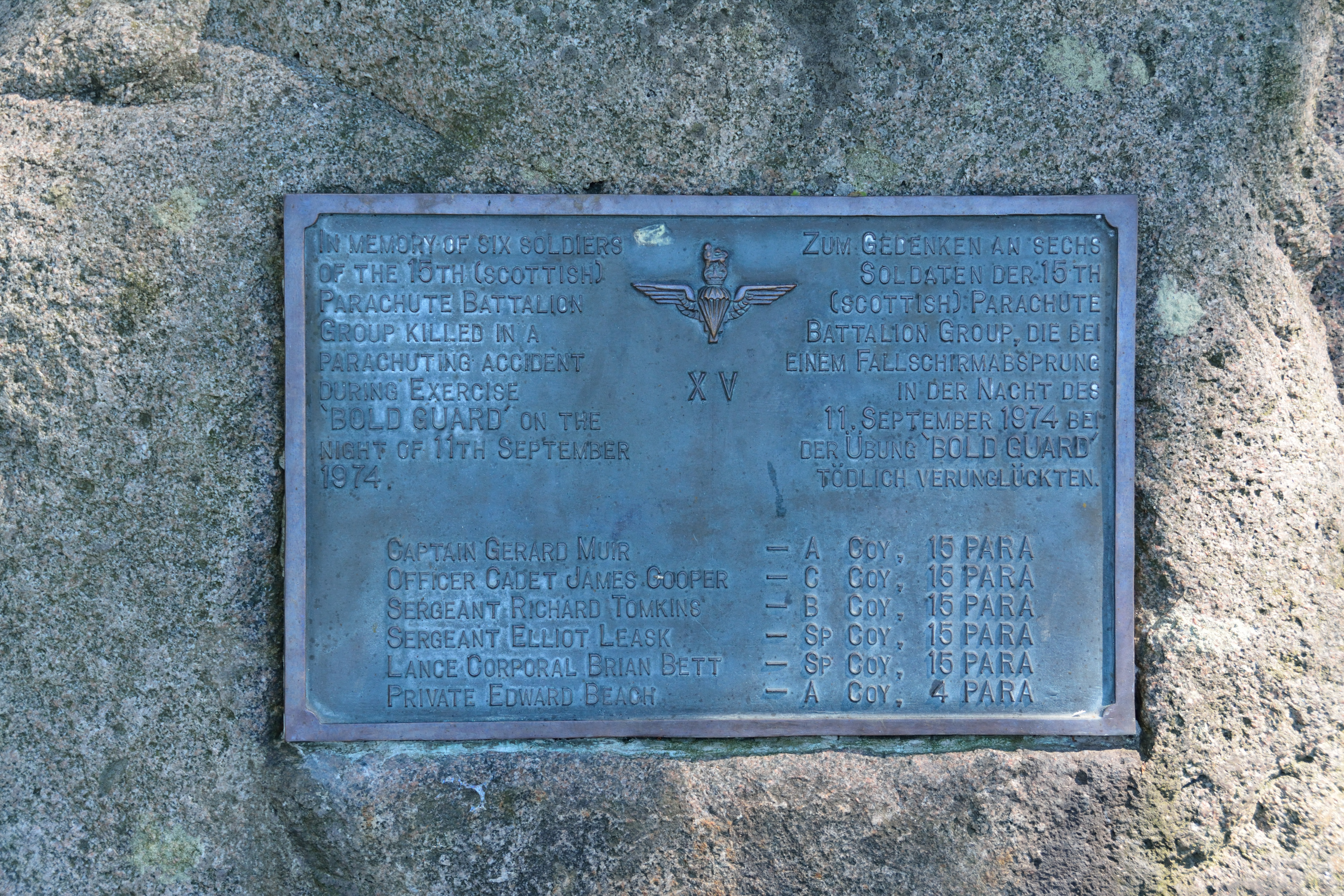
