= Russian frigate Yaroslav Mudry =

Neustrashimy-class frigate of the Russian Navy

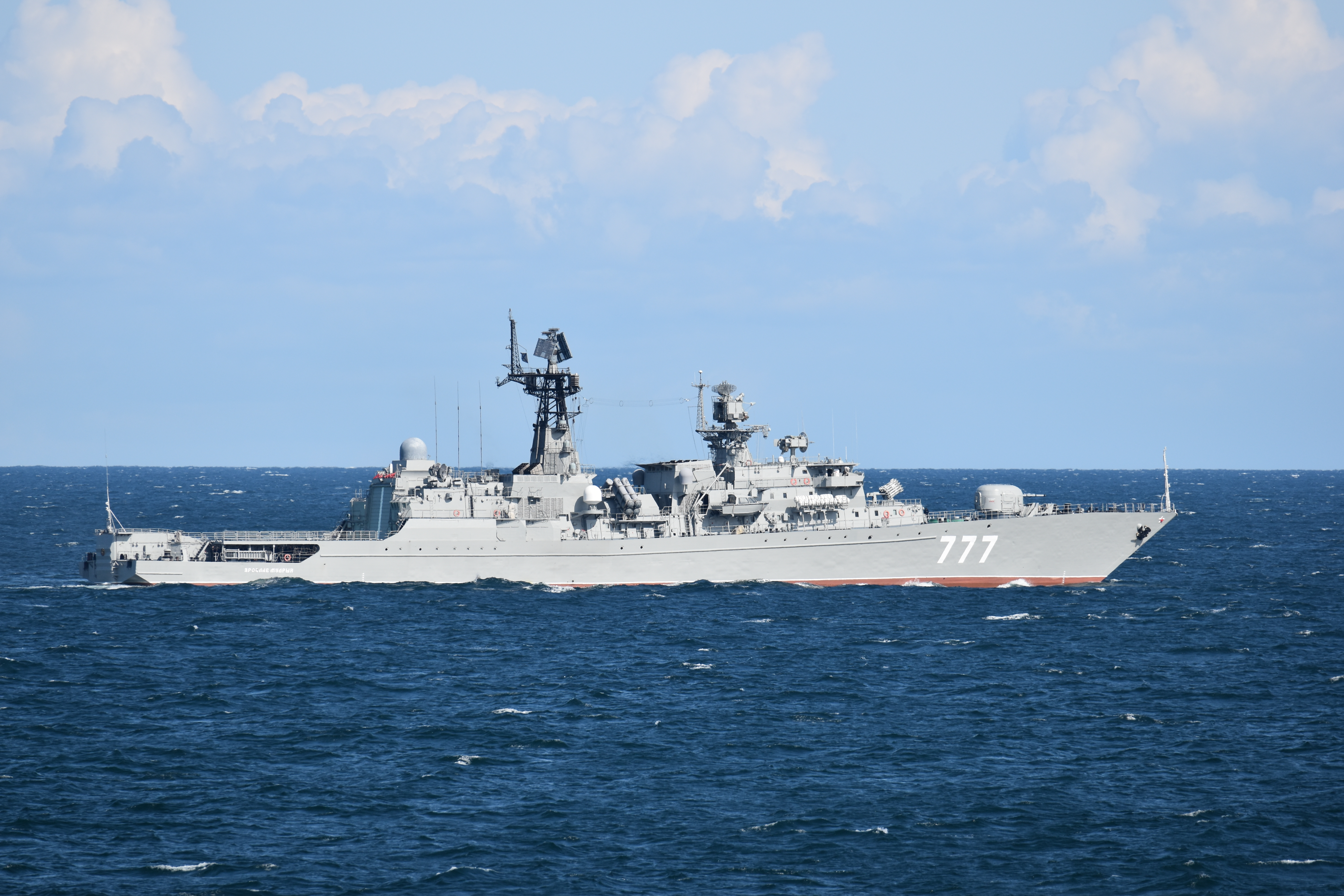
- Yaroslav Mudry in 2019

History

Soviet Union → Russia
- Name: Nepristupny; (Неприступный)
- Renamed: Yaroslav Mudry; (Ярослав Мудрый)
- Namesake: Russian for Impregnable; Yaroslav the Wise
- Builder: Yantar Shipyard, Kaliningrad
- Yard number: 402
- Laid down: 27 May 1988
- Launched: May 1991
- Commissioned: 24 July 2009
- Home port: Baltiysk
- Status: In active service

General characteristics
- Class & type: Neustrashimy-class frigate
- Displacement: 3,950 tonnes (3,888 long tons) standard; 4,350 t (4,281 long tons) full load
- Length: 129.8 m (425 ft 10 in)
- Beam: 15.6 m (51 ft 2 in)
- Draft: 4.8 m (15 ft 9 in)
- Propulsion: 2 × M-27 gas-turbines systems, 28,500 hp (21,252 kW); 2 × shafts
- Speed: 29 knots (54 km/h; 33 mph)
- Range: 3,000 nmi (5,600 km; 3,500 mi) at 18 knots (33 km/h; 21 mph)
- Endurance: 30 days
- Complement: 210 crew
- Sensors & processing systems: MR-750 Fregat-M2 air/surface-search radar; MR-212 Vaygach navigation radar; MGK-365 Zvezda-M1 sonar complex; Tron-11540 combat information system; R-782 Buran communication complex; Korall communication complex; Beysur navigational complex; Tsentavr satellite communication complex; 1 × MR-145 fire-control system
- Electronic warfare & decoys: MP-405-1 ESM
- Armament: 1 × 100 mm (4 in) A-190E gun; 2 × 4 Kh-35 Uran-E SSM launchers; 4 × 8 3K95 Kinzhal SAM launchers; 2 × 3M87 Kortik CIWS; 6 × 533 mm (21 in) torpedo tubes for RPK-2/6 anti-submarine missiles or Type 53 torpedoes; 1 × RBU-6000 Smerch-2 anti-submarine rocket launcher; naval mines; 2 × single NSVT-12,7 Utes guns; 2 × ten-tube DP-65 grenade launchers
- Aircraft carried: 1 × Kamov Ka-27PL

Yaroslav Mudry is a Neustrashimy-class frigate of the Baltic Fleet of the Russian Navy. The ship is the second of the class, known in Russia as Project 11540 Yastreb (hawk). The ship is designed to search for, detect and track enemy submarines, to provide anti-ship and anti-submarine protection, and to support military operations of the Russian Army, ensuring the landing of naval assault forces and other tasks.

== Construction and career ==
Her keel was laid on 27 May 1988 with yard number 402 at the Yantar Shipyard in Kaliningrad as Nepristupny. The ship was launched in 1990 or May 1991 and was scheduled for completion in 1992. The construction of the ship was suspended in December 1992 due to lack of funding. In the meantime, the ship was renamed to Yaroslav Mudry on 30 August 1995. According to the shipyard in October 1998, the hull would be sold for scrap. The construction work was restarted in 2002 or June 2003. The frigate started sea trials on 26 February 2009. Yaroslav Mudry was commissioned to the Baltic Fleet of Russian Navy on 24 July 2009. The ship is based at Baltiysk.

The ship has been part of the Baltic Fleet since 19 June 2009, and was commissioned on 24 July 2009.

In July 2010, it was reported that in 2011, after negotiations with Ukraine, the ship would be transferred to the Black Sea Fleet to maintain the operational integrity of the fleet's area of responsibility - the Black and Mediterranean Seas. Although the transfer did not take place, the ship is occasionally seen in the Mediterranean Sea and off the Horn of Africa.

From 7 December 2011 to 10 February 2012 the ship participated in a campaign of the inter-naval combined group in the Mediterranean Sea, led by the aircraft carrier Admiral Kuznetsov. On 25 April 2012 the ship was transferred, with the consent of Vice-Admiral VV Chirkov, Commander of the Baltic Fleet, to the "patronage of the head of the Russian Imperial House of Grand Duchess Maria Vladimirovna”.

== Ship captains ==
- 2009 - October 2011 - Commander A. Shishkaryov
- October 2011 - 5 July 2013 Commander Alexey Suglobov
- 2013-2014 - Commander Evgeny Anatolievich Tishkevich
- Summer 2014 to 26 August 2015- Commander Cherokov
- 26 August 2015 to 21 February 2018 - Lt Cdr Novozhilov
- 21 February 2018 to present - Commander Navolotsky

== Patrons ==
25 April 2012 to Present - Maria Vladimirovna
