= Robert Davenport (Royal Navy officer) =

Royal Navy admiral

Vice-Admiral Robert Davenport CB
- Born: 13 April 1882; Abingdon, Oxfordshire
- Died: 15 June 1965 (aged 83)
- Military career
- Allegiance: United Kingdom
- Branch: Royal Navy
- Service years: 1896–1938; 1939–1946
- Rank: Vice-Admiral
- Commands: HMS Despatch; HMS Queen Elizabeth; Coast of Scotland
- Conflicts: Second Boer War; World War I World War II
- Awards: Companion of the Order of the Bath

Vice-Admiral Robert Clutterbuck Davenport CB (13 April 1882 – 15 June 1965) was a Royal Navy officer who became Commander-in-Chief, Coast of Scotland.

== Naval career ==
Educated on HMS Britannia, Davenport joined the Royal Navy as a cadet in 1896. He was confirmed as a sub-lieutenant on 15 April 1901, served in the Second Boer War and World War I. He became Commanding Officer of the cruiser HMS Despatch in 1924 and the battleship HMS Queen Elizabeth in 1930 and went on to be Commander-in-Chief, Coast of Scotland in 1935. He retired in 1938 but was recalled to serve in World War II as Commodore of Convoys from 1939 and then on the Selection Board for Temporary Commissions in the Royal Naval Volunteer Reserve from 1941 until his final retirement in 1946.

== Family ==
In 1917 he married Gwladwys Mabel Halahan (née Gwatkin-Williams).

Military offices
Preceded by Everard Hardman-Jones	Commander-in-Chief, Coast of Scotland; 1935–1937	Succeeded by Evelyn Thomson
