= Michael Livesay =

Royal Navy Admiral (1936-2003)

Admiral Sir Michael Livesay KCB
- Born: 5 April 1936
- Died: 6 October 2003 (aged 67)
- Military career
- Allegiance: United Kingdom
- Branch: Royal Navy
- Service years: 1957–1993
- Rank: Admiral
- Commands: Flag Officer, Scotland and Northern Ireland; Flag Officer Sea Training; HMS Invincible; HMS Plymouth; HMS Hubberston
- Conflicts: Falklands War
- Awards: Knight Commander of the Order of the Bath

Admiral Sir Michael Howard Livesay, KCB (5 April 1936 – 6 October 2003) was a senior Royal Navy officer who served as Second Sea Lord and Chief of Naval Personnel from 1991 to 1992.

== Naval career ==
Educated at Acklam Hall Grammar School and Royal Naval College Dartmouth, Livesay was commissioned into the Royal Navy in 1957. He was made commanding officer of the minesweeper HMS Hubberston in 1966 and of the frigate HMS Plymouth in 1970. He went on to be captain, Fishery Protection and Mine Counter Measures, based in Scotland in 1975, and the first commander of the aircraft carrier HMS Invincible in 1979.

Livesay was director of naval warfare at the Ministry of Defence during the Falklands War, during which he developed the "Rules of Engagement" and then, in 1984, went on to be Flag Officer Sea Training. He was appointed assistant chief of the Naval Staff in 1986 and Flag Officer Scotland and Northern Ireland in 1989. His final posting was as Second Sea Lord and chief of naval personnel as well as president of the Royal Naval College, Greenwich in 1991; he retired in 1993.

In retirement Livesay became chairman of the Northern Lighthouse Board and a non-executive director of Scottish Nuclear. He lived at Auchterarder in Perthshire.

== Family ==
In 1959 Livesay married to Sarah "Sally" House: they had two daughters.

Military offices
Preceded by John Webster	Flag Officer Sea Training; 1984–1985	Succeeded by Barry Wilson
Preceded by Jeremy Black	Assistant Chief of the Naval Staff; 1986–1988	Succeeded by Hugo White
Preceded by Sir Jock Slater	Flag Officer, Scotland and Northern Ireland; 1989–1991	Succeeded by Sir Hugo White
Preceded by Sir Brian Brown	Second Sea Lord; 1991–1992	Succeeded by Sir Michael Layard
