= Action of 11 November 2008 =

Naval battle of Operation Enduring Freedom

11 November 2008, incident off Somalia
- Part of Operation Ocean Shield
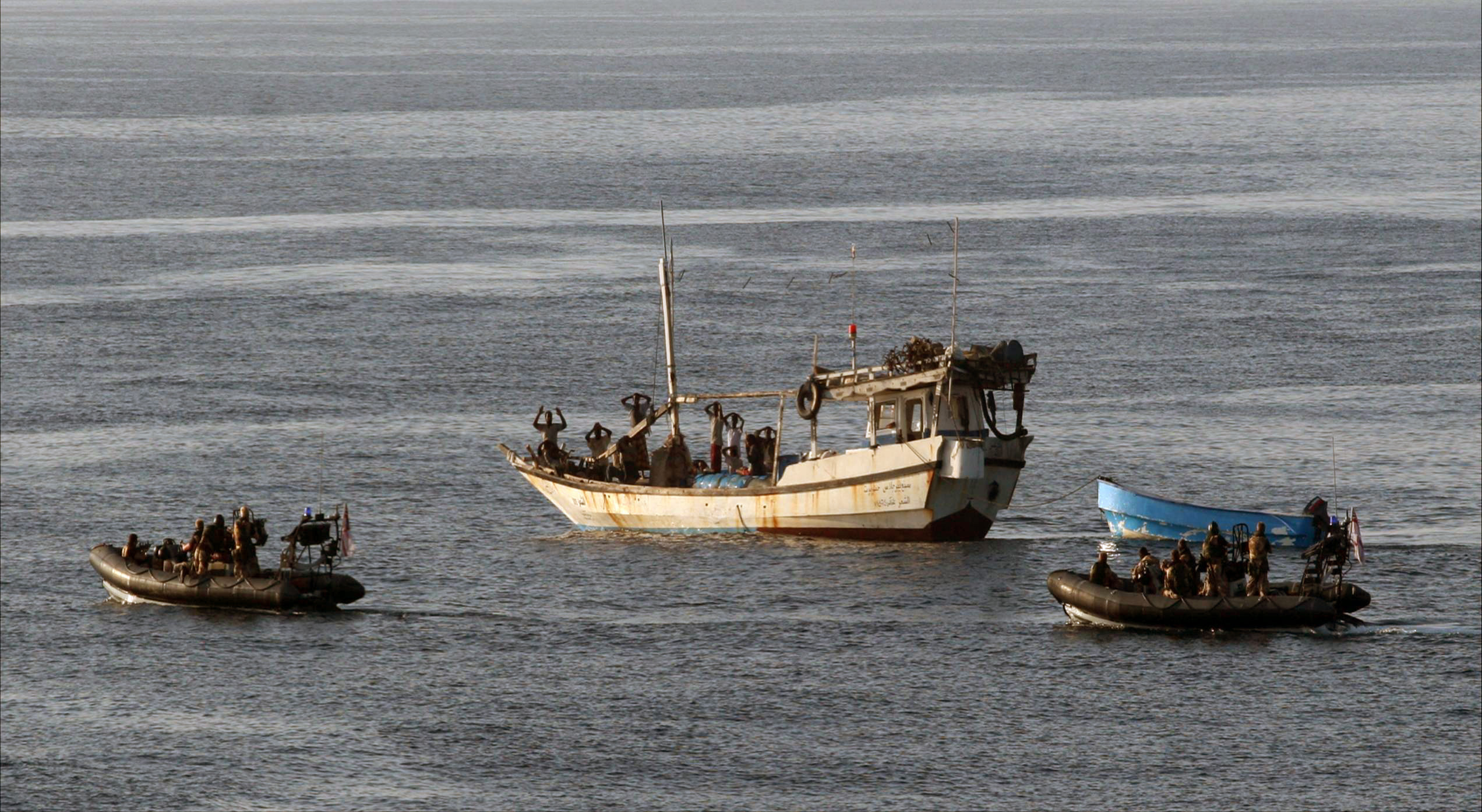
- Pirates surrendering after engaging Royal Marines
Date	11 November 2008
Location	60 nmi (110 km) off Yemen, Gulf of Aden
Result	British victory

Belligerents
United Kingdom; Royal Navy; Royal Marines	Somali pirates

Commanders and leaders
Peter Sparkes	Unknown

Strength
2 frigates 1 freighter 2 rigid inflatable boats	1 armed dhow

Casualties and losses
None	3 killed 8 captured 1 armed dhow captured

The action of 11 November 2008 was a naval engagement fought off Somalia between pirates and British forces. Russia has stated that its forces fought off the pirates also, though Russia's involvement has been disputed by the Royal Navy. The incident took place 60 nautical miles (110 km) south of the Yemeni coast, in the Gulf of Aden. When the Royal Navy ship HMS Cumberland, "attached to the NATO task force in the region" attempted to board a Somali pirate dhow with twelve pirates on board, the pirates initially resisted with assault rifle fire. After a brief shoot-out with the Royal Marines, two pirates were killed and the dhow was captured by Cumberland. The Times has described the incident as "the first time the Royal Navy had been engaged in a fatal shoot-out on the high seas in living memory." The Independent has also stated that the confrontation "is believed to be the first time recently that British naval service personnel have been involved in a confrontation that resulted in deaths", and The Toronto Star has stated that the engagement is "the first time since the 1982 Falklands War that the Royal Navy had killed anyone on the high seas."

== Background ==
As of 11 November 2008, 32 ships had been hijacked in the Gulf of Aden by pirates. The Gulf of Aden has been described as "a treacherous stretch for ships, particularly along the Somali coast". To protect commercial vessels off the coast of Somalia, a multi-national task force was deployed to the area.

== Incident ==
On 11 November pirates on board a dhow attacked MV Powerful, a Danish-registered cargo ship, using assault rifles in a failed attempt to hijack the ship. A Russian Navy spokesman, Igor Dygalo, said that the pirates attempted twice to capture the ship, and were rebuffed by British and Russian helicopters operating from HMS Cumberland and the Russian frigate Neustrashimy respectively. However, Russian involvement in preventing the pirates from capturing Powerful has been disputed by the Royal Navy.

Later that day, Cumberland detected the dhow, which was towing a skiff, and identified it as a vessel involved in the attack against Powerful. The Royal Marines unit on board Cumberland was dispatched in Rigid Raider craft towards the dhow. The Marines then proceeded to circle the dhow, which had on board 12 men armed with rocket launchers and machine guns, in an attempt to force it to stop.

The pirates opened fire on them, but no casualties were sustained by the Marines. Returning fire, the Marines killed two Somalis. The pirates subsequently surrendered, and the Marines boarded the dhow. The Royal Navy described the boarding itself as "compliant". Russia has claimed that one of its helicopters, based aboard Neustrashimy, was involved in this firefight between the pirates and the Marines, though the Royal Navy deny this claim, stating that the Marines were supported by a Lynx helicopter from HMS Cumberland.

== Aftermath ==
“	This [November 11, 2008 incident off Somalia] is bound to have an impact on pirates who for the last two years have been getting away with seizing vessels and receiving large ransoms. Now suddenly there’s the threat of death and this may force them to think again, but they are determined people, so we’ll have to see.	”
– Captain Mike Davis-Marks, a senior spokesman for the Royal Navy.

On board the dhow was a Yemeni male who, despite receiving emergency treatment, died from his injuries. The British Ministry of Defence reported that it was unclear as to whether the fatal injuries were the result of the gunfight, or whether they were sustained beforehand. The incident, according to The Times, "signalled a new policy of maximum robustness for the Royal Navy on the high seas".

The remaining eight men who had been captured on board the dhow along with the bodies of the two pirates killed were transferred to RFA Wave Knight. The eight survivors were handed over to Kenyan authorities in Mombasa on November 18 while the two dead pirates were later buried at sea off the eastern coast of Somalia.
