= Plant small nucleolar RNA R71 =

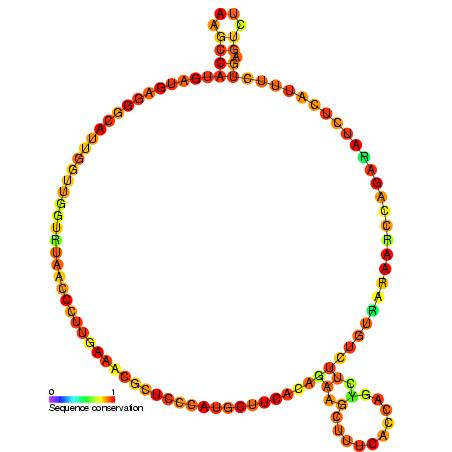
- Predicted secondary structure and sequence conservation of snoR71

Identifiers
- Symbol: snoR71
- Rfam: RF00097

Other data
- RNA type: Gene; snRNA; snoRNA; CD-box
- Domain: Eukaryota
- GO: GO:0006396 GO:0005730
- SO: SO:0000593
- PDB structures: PDBe

In molecular biology, small nucleolar RNA R71 (also known as snoRNA R71) is a non-coding RNA (ncRNA) molecule which functions in the modification of other small nuclear RNAs (snRNAs). This type of modifying RNA is usually located in the nucleolus of the eukaryotic cell which is a major site of snRNA biogenesis. It is known as a small nucleolar RNA (snoRNA) and also often referred to as a guide RNA.

R71 belongs to the C/D box class of snoRNAs which contain the conserved sequence motifs known as the C box (UGAUGA) and the D box (CUGA). Most of the members of the box C/D family function in directing site-specific 2'-O-methylation of substrate RNAs.

Multiple, nearly identical copies of this snoRNA have been identified in the Arabidopsis thaliana genome and it is thought to function as a 2'-O-ribose methylation guide for 18S ribosomal RNA (rRNA).
