= HMS Oracle (S16) =

Submarine of the Royal Navy

- HMS Oracle

History

United Kingdom
- Name: HMS Oracle
- Builder: Cammell Laird, Birkenhead
- Laid down: 26 April 1960
- Launched: 26 September 1961
- Commissioned: 14 February 1963
- Decommissioned: 18 September 1993
- Fate: Transferred to Pounds scrapyard, Portsmouth in 1997 for breaking up, completed in mid-2003.

General characteristics as designed
- Class & type: Oberon-class submarine
- Displacement: 1,610 tons standard; 2,030 tons full load surfaced; 2,410 tons full load submerged
- Length: 241 feet (73 m) between perpendiculars; 295.2 feet (90.0 m) length overall
- Beam: 26.5 feet (8.1 m)
- Draught: 18 feet (5.5 m)
- Propulsion: 2 × Admiralty Standard Range 16 VMS diesel generators; 2 × 3,000 shaft horsepower (2,200 kW) electric motors; 2 shafts
- Speed: 17 knots (31 km/h; 20 mph) submerged; 12 knots (22 km/h; 14 mph) surfaced
- Complement: 68
- Sensors & processing systems: Type 186 and Type 187 sonars; I-band surface search radar
- Armament: 8 × 21-inch (530 mm) torpedo tubes (6 forward, 2 aft); 24 torpedoes

HMS Oracle was an Oberon-class submarine of the Royal Navy.

== Design and construction ==
The Oberon class was a direct follow on of the Porpoise-class, with the same dimensions and external design, but updates to equipment and internal fittings, and a higher grade of steel used for the fabrication of the pressure hull.

As designed for British service, the Oberon-class submarines were 241 feet (73 m) in length between perpendiculars and 295.2 feet (90.0 m) in length overall, with a beam of 26.5 feet (8.1 m), and a draught of 18 feet (5.5 m). Displacement was 1,610 tons standard, 2,030 tons full load when surfaced, and 2,410 tons full load when submerged. Propulsion machinery consisted of 2 Admiralty Standard Range 16 VMS diesel generators, and two 3,000 shaft horsepower (2,200 kW) electric motors, each driving a 7-foot diameter (2.1 m) 3-bladed propeller at up to 400 rpm. Top speed was 17 knots (31 km/h; 20 mph) when submerged, and 12 knots (22 km/h; 14 mph) on the surface. Eight 21-inch (530 mm) diameter torpedo tubes were fitted (six facing forward, two aft), with a total payload of 24 torpedoes. The boats were fitted with Type 186 and Type 187 sonars, and an I-band surface search radar. The standard complement was 68: 6 officers, 62 sailors.

Oracle was laid down by Cammell Laird on 26 April 1960, and launched on 26 September 1961. The boat was commissioned into the Royal Navy on 14 February 1963.

== Operational history ==
Oracle performed three-month secret 'observation' missions in the Arctic region in 1965 during the Cold War period and was on stand-by duty during the tumultuous period when Rhodesia announced independence.

Oracle attended the 1977 Silver Jubilee Fleet Review off Spithead when she was part of the Submarine Flotilla.

Oracle featured in the 1980s BBC documentary series Submarine as she was host to Perisher trainee submarine commanders.

== Decommissioning and fate ==
Oracle was paid off on 18 September 1993.

== Publications ==
- Colledge, J. J.; Warlow, Ben (2006) [1969]. Ships of the Royal Navy: The Complete Record of All Fighting Ships of the Royal Navy from the 15th Century to the Present (3rd Rev ed.). London: Chatham Publishing. ISBN 978-1-86176-281-8. OCLC 67375475.
