= Ernest Archer (Royal Navy officer) =

Royal Navy Admiral (1891–1958)

Admiral Sir Ernest Archer KCB CBE
- Born: 14 September 1891; Dover, Kent, England
- Died: 17 December 1958 (aged 67); Winchester, Hampshire, England
- Military career
- Allegiance: United Kingdom
- Branch: Royal Navy
- Service years: 1904–1950
- Rank: Admiral
- Commands: HMS Revenge; Royal Navy Barracks at Portsmouth; Flag Officer, Gibraltar; Flag Officer Scotland, Northern England, Northern Ireland
- Conflicts: World War I World War II
- Awards: Knight Commander of the Order of the Bath; Commander of the Order of the British Empire

Admiral Sir Ernest Russell Archer, KCB, CBE (14 September 1891 – 17 December 1958) was a Royal Navy officer who became Flag Officer, Scotland and Northern Ireland.

== Naval career ==
Archer joined the Royal Navy in 1904. He served in World War I in destroyers. He also served in World War II as Captain of the battleship HMS Revenge from 1939: in this capacity he led the transport of the UK's gold bullion to Canada in July 1940. He continued his war service as Commander of the Royal Navy Barracks at Portsmouth from 1941, as Senior Naval Officer in North Russia from 1943 and then as Head of the Joint Services Mission to Moscow from 1944. After the War he became Flag Officer, Gibraltar. He was promoted to vice-admiral on 16 May 1947, and appointed Flag Officer, Scotland and Northern Ireland in 1948 and retired in 1950.

== Family ==
In 1917 he married Margaret Elizabeth Hope Bayly.

Military offices
Preceded by Sir Frederick Dalrymple-Hamilton	Flag Officer, Scotland and Northern Ireland; 1948–1950	Succeeded by Sir Angus Cunninghame Graham
