= John Weale (Royal Navy officer) =

Royal Navy Rear Admiral (born 1962)

Rear Admiral John Weale CB OBE
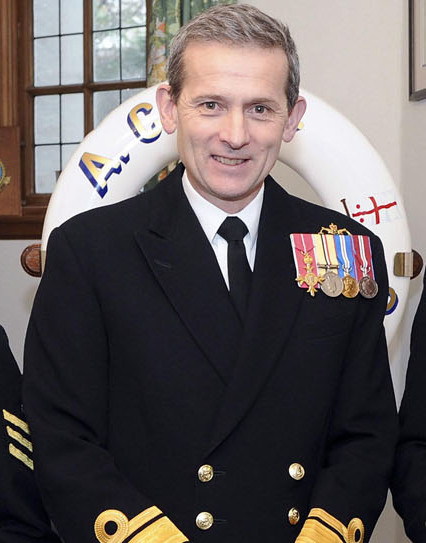
- Weale in 2016
- Born: 14 July 1962 (age 64); Glasgow, Scotland
- Military career
- Allegiance: United Kingdom
- Branch: Royal Navy
- Service years: 1985–2020
- Rank: Rear Admiral
- Commands: Flag Officer Scotland and Northern Ireland; HMS Trafalgar
- Conflicts: Iraq War
- Awards: Companion of the Order of the Bath; Officer of the Order of the British Empire

Rear Admiral John Stuart Weale, CB, OBE (born 14 July 1962) is a former Royal Navy officer who served as Flag Officer Scotland and Northern Ireland, Assistant Chief of Naval Staff Submarines and Rear Admiral Submarines.

== Early life ==
Weale was born on 14 July 1962 in Glasgow, Scotland. He was educated at St Augustine's College in Thanet, the University of Westminster and the Royal Naval College, Dartmouth.

== Naval career ==
Weale joined the Royal Navy in 1985. He completed the Submarine Command Course in 1995. He became commanding officer of the submarine HMS Trafalgar in 1999 and then became Operations Officer in the aircraft carrier HMS Illustrious in 2006 in which role he took part in the evacuation of British citizens during the 2006 Lebanon War via Cyprus. He went on to be Chief of Staff to Combined Task Force 158, a naval task force operating in Iraqi waters in 2008.

He became Commander of Sea Training North in 2010 and Deputy Flag Officer Sea Training in 2012. He became Flag Officer Scotland and Northern Ireland and Assistant Chief of the Naval Staff Submarines in July 2015 and, additionally, Rear Admiral Submarines in October 2015. Weale ended his appointment as Rear Admiral Submarines sometime in 2020. Weale retired from the Royal Navy on 6 May 2020.

Weale was appointed an Officer of the Order of the British Empire in the 2009 Birthday Honours, and a Companion of the Order of the Bath in the 2019 New Year Honours.

Military offices
Preceded by John Clink	Flag Officer Scotland and Northern Ireland; 2015-2020	Succeeded by office disbanded
