= Jock Pearson =

Renowned WW2 officer

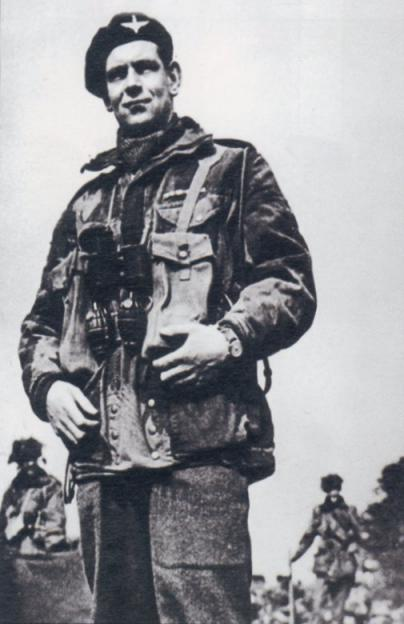
- Born: Alastair Stevenson Pearson; 1 June 1915; Glasgow, Scotland
- Died: 29 March 1996 (aged 80); Gartocharn, Dunbartonshire, Scotland
- Military career
- Allegiance: United Kingdom
- Branch: British Army
- Rank: Brigadier
- Service number: 62792
- Units: Highland Light Infantry; Parachute Regiment
- Commands: 1st Parachute Battalion; 8th Parachute Battalion; 15th (Scottish Volunteer) Parachute Battalion
- Conflicts: Second World War: Battle of France; British airborne operations in North Africa; Operation Fustian; Operation Tonga; 6th Airborne Division advance to the River Seine
- Awards: Companion of the Order of the Bath; Companion of the Distinguished Service Order & Three Bars; Officer of the Order of the British Empire; Military Cross; Territorial Decoration
- Other work: Commandant of the Army Cadet Force in Scotland

Brigadier Alastair "Jock" Stevenson Pearson, CB, DSO & Three Bars, OBE, MC, TD, DL (1 June 1915 – 29 March 1996) was a baker, farmer and one of the most highly regarded soldiers of the Parachute Regiment and the British Army who served in the Second World War.

== Early life ==
Pearson was born in Glasgow, Scotland, on 1 June 1915. He was educated at Kelvinside Academy. After leaving school, he worked as a baker and enlisted in the Territorial Army. He joined the 6th Battalion of the Highland Light Infantry, based in Yorkhill, and part of the 157th Infantry Brigade, 52nd (Lowland) Infantry Division, which was fully mobilised in 1939.

== Second World War ==
Pearson was attached to the South Lancashire Regiment and served briefly in France during January 1940. On 8 June 1940, after the end of Operation Dynamo, he returned to France with the 6th Highland Light Infantry. He fought in the Battle of France with the Second British Expeditionary Force. He was evacuated on 17 June as part of Operation Aerial.

On its return to the United Kingdom, the 52nd (Lowland) Infantry Division was assigned to defend the coast. In 1942 Pearson volunteered to join the British Army's airborne forces and on 1 August he joined the Parachute Regiment, part of the Army Air Corps. He was promoted to the rank of major and served as second-in-command of 2nd Battalion, part of 1st Parachute Brigade. Within a fortnight, Pearson was transferred to 1st Battalion by the commander, Eric Down. Pearson was promptly demoted by Down after a riotous night on the town. He was then promoted to the rank of major for the second time before becoming second-in-command of 1st Battalion under James Hill.

In October 1942, the 1st Parachute Brigade was sent to Tunisia to participate in Operation Torch. Pearson assumed command of 1st Battalion when Hill was badly wounded on 23 November. For his actions while under heavy fire, Pearson was awarded the Military Cross. At the age of twenty-seven, Pearson was promoted to lieutenant colonel and given command of the 1st Parachute Battalion. Pearson was appointed a Companion of the Distinguished Service Order for his actions in late January and early February 1943. He was awarded a Bar to his DSO for actions during the Battle of Tamera in March.

Pearson was awarded a second Bar to his DSO for his contribution to the invasion of Sicily. In July 1943, the 1st Parachute Brigade was assigned to capture Primosole Bridge in Sicily, ahead of Bernard Montgomery's British Eighth Army. Due to high winds, intense flak, and poor flying, less than 20% of the 1,900 men of the brigade landed on target. However, the bridge was captured and Pearson organized a defence. German forces counter-attacked the following day and the paratroopers were forced to withdraw. Pearson helped to recapture the bridge by guiding a battalion of the Durham Light Infantry, part of 151st Brigade, in an attack on the flank of the German infantry holding the bridge. After the Sicilian campaign, Pearson recuperated from an attack of malaria.

During the summer of 1944, the commander of the new 6th Airborne Division, Major General Richard Gale gave Pearson command of the division's 8th Parachute Battalion, which was assigned to the 3rd Parachute Brigade. Pearson immediately began preparing the battalion for the Battle of Normandy. On the night of 5 June 1944, the battalion departed England for France. Upon landing, as part of Operation Tonga (the British airborne drops on D-Day), Pearson was shot in the hand but continued to command. The 8th Parachute Battalion went on to destroy several bridges over the River Dives and then take up defensive positions in the Bavent Wood, east of Pegasus Bridge. Pearson was awarded a third Bar to his DSO in February 1945 for his contributions during the Battle of Normandy.

On his return to England in September 1944, Pearson surrendered command of the 8th Parachute Battalion due to ill health. He married the widow of Reginald Morgan Weld Smith (who was killed in the Battle of Britain), Joan Niven.

== Later life ==
Following the end of the war, Pearson resigned his commission to return to his bakery in Glasgow. In 1947, he rejoined the Territorial Army and commanded the 15th (Scottish Volunteer) Parachute Battalion. Later, he gave up the bakery to turn to farming. In 1951, he was made a Deputy Lord-Lieutenant for Glasgow. In 1953 he was promoted to colonel and, in 1967, he was promoted to brigadier and became Commandant of the Army Cadet Force in Scotland.

In June 1956, Pearson was appointed aide-de-camp to the Queen, a ceremonial post he held until 1961. He was appointed an Officer of the Order of the British Empire in the 1953 Coronation Honours, and a Companion of the Order of the Bath on 12 June 1958. He was appointed Deputy Lord Lieutenant of Dunbartonshire in 1975, and Lord Lieutenant in 1979.

== Honours and awards ==
- 4 May 1943 – Companion of the Distinguished Service Order Major (acting lieutenant-colonel) Alastair Stevenson Pearsonis (62792) Army Air Corps (Glasgow, W.2):

On 31st January 1943, Lieutenant-Colonel Pearson led two of his platoons in a raid on Djebel Mansour (Tunisia) during which, in spite of intense machine gun and mortar fire, he succeeded in over-running an enemy Company position, capturing prisoners and killing or wounded the majority of the other occupants, he gained valuable knowledge for a contemplated assault at a later date.

On 3rd February 1943, he led his Battalion on to the same feature, which was entirely captured and held, until severe casualties and a strong counter-attack forced their withdrawal.

Throughout the whole operation this officer fearlessly led his Battalion and, by his example and utter disregard for his personal safety, was an inspiration to all ranks. By his skilful handling and courage he was able to evacuate all his men. On one occasion he, single-handed, destroyed an enemy machine gun post which was causing severe casualties. London Gazette

- 18 May 1943 – Bar to the Distinguished Service Order insignia: Major (temporary Lieutenant-Colonel) Alastair Stevenson Pearson DSO (62792) Army Air Corps. (Glasgow, W.2):

"For most conspicuous gallantry and devotion to duty at Tamera (Tunisia) on 8th March 1943. The enemy attacked in considerable force the positions held by this officer's Battalion. Completely disregarding his personal safety, when one of his companies had been forced back, he personally led the counter-attack and completely restored the situation. In the course of the day his Battalion was attacked on three separate occasions. Without hesitation and under intense fire he organised counter attacks and by his brilliant leadership and bravery on all occasions, restored the position, killing large numbers of the enemy and forcing some 150 to give themselves up. Attacked again on 10th March he personally led his Battalion HQ staff of clerks and cooks against the enemy who was attacking from the rear of his Battalion HQ. Inspiring all with his great bravery and leadership he completely defeated all efforts of the enemy to penetrate his positions, personally killing many of the enemy and capturing further prisoners. During the night 23/24 March he led his Battalion to the attack on a most important feature in the DJ ABIOD sector (DK DAWRA), conducting this most difficult operation with such skill that the whole position was soon in our hands with slight losses to ourselves, but with heavy losses to the enemy. His bravery and leadership at all times under intense fire have been of the highest order and an inspiration to all ranks of his battalion.

- 23 September 1943 Military Cross: Captain (temporary Major) Alastair Stevenson Pearson D.S.O. (62792), Army Air Corps (Glasgow 19):

During the night 23/24 November 1942, when his Commanding Officer was severely wounded, Major Pearson assumed command of his Battalion and successfully completed the Operation. He continued to command his unit throughout the subsequent fighting and by his leadership and coolness under fire set an example of the highest degree. On Dec 11th, when the enemy attacked his sector, he, under heavy machine gun fire, organised and personally led a most successful counter attack destroying the enemy and capturing a number of prisoners. The conspicuous gallantry shown on this and other occasions has been an inspiration to all.

— London Gazette

- 23 December 1943 Second Bar to the Distinguished Service Order insignia: Major (temporary Lieutenant-Colonel) Alastair Stevenson Pearson, D.S.O., M.C. (62792), Army Air Corps (Glasgow, W.2):

Lieutenant-Colonel Pearson was in command of the 1st Parachute Battalion when it took part in the Airborne attack at Catania on the night 13/14 July 1943. He and his Battalion were widely scattered, but he collected all the men he could find and led a successful attack on the main objective. Throughout the battle, which included counter attacks, he displayed courage and leadership of the very highest order. When his Battalion was withdrawn from the battle, he remained with 151 Infantry Brigade in order to give them the benefit of his local knowledge, which he usefully employed during an attack on the following night.

— London Gazette

- 1 February 1945 – Third Bar to the Distinguished Service Order insignia. Major (temporary Lieutenant-Colonel) Alastair Stevenson Pearson, D.S.O., M.C. (62792), Army Air Corps (Devizes):

Lieutenant-Colonel Pearson was dropped at 0050 hrs on D Day, 6th June 1944. He was immediately wounded by rifle fire in the left hand. Disregarding his wound he organised his depleted Battalion, some 180 strong, into two company groups and successfully engaged the enemy at Bures and Troarn enabling the bridge blowing parties to carry out their tasks with complete success. On the evening of D Day he was forced to undergo an operation for the removal of the bullet from his hand but immediately resumed command of the Battalion on its conclusion.
On the night of D plus 1, he personally led a patrol of 40 men some 4 miles behind the enemy lines to evacuate wounded reported at the village of Bassenville. This necessitated the double crossing of the River Dives by dinghy. The patrol, as a result of his skilful leadership, was entirely successful and eight wounded men were rescued. On D plus 2 he personally supervised the operation of a strong fighting patrol which inflicted heavy casualties on the enemy in Troarn. On the night of D plus 6 he personally led a patrol of some 70 men to the village of ROUCHEVILLE and engaged the enemy position to the North of the village while his RE detachment successfully cratered the only remaining road for lateral communication left to the enemy in the district. On D plus 9 the enemy attacked the LE MESNIL position in strength. Lieutenant-Colonel Pearson conducted the battle personally through the whole attack and was tireless in his visits to the forward companies. When the enemy, supported by self-propelled guns, started to penetrate between the forward positions, he moved forward with the counter attack force handling his own men and 17 pounder self-propelled gun with such success that the enemy infantry and self-propelled guns were forced to withdraw in some disorder. Throughout the day he moved amongst his troops under artillery, heavy mortar and machine-gun fire and his conduct was an inspiration to the whole Battalion. By his brilliant handling of the Battalion during the first week of the operation he was able to hold off a numerically superior enemy from the vital high ground at the South end of the BOIS DE BAVENT..

— London Gazette

- 3 September 1948 – Lieutenant Colonel Alastair Stevenson Pearson is (62792) is awarded Efficiency Medal.

== Television appearances ==
Pearson was the subject of This Is Your Life in October 1961 when he was surprised by Eamonn Andrews at the BBC Television Theatre.

== Footnotes ==
Honorary titles
Preceded by James Cassels Robertson	Lord Lieutenant of Dunbartonshire; 1979–1990	Succeeded by Donald Hardie
