= HMS Constance (R71) =

C-class destroyer

History

United Kingdom
- Name: HMS Constance
- Ordered: 12 September 1942
- Builder: Vickers-Armstrongs
- Laid down: 11 March 1943
- Launched: 22 June 1944
- Commissioned: 6 June 1945
- Identification: Pennant number: R71, later changed to D71
- Motto: Desirmais : "Thereafter"
- Fate: Arrived for scrapping at Inverkeithing on 8 March 1956
- Badge: On a field Blue, a Dragon Red on three wavelets Gold

General characteristics
- Class & type: C-class destroyer
- Displacement: 1,885 tons (1,915 tonnes); 2,545 tons full (2,585 tonnes)
- Length: 362.75 ft (110.57 m) o/a
- Beam: 35.75 ft (10.90 m)
- Draught: 11.75 ft (3.58 m)
- Propulsion: 2 Admiralty 3-drum boilers, Parsons single-reduction geared steam turbines, 40,000 shp (29.8 MW), 2 shafts
- Speed: 36 knots (67 km/h) / 32 knots (59 km/h) full
- Range: 4,675 nmi (8,658 km) at 20 knots (37 km/h); 1,400 nmi (2,600 km) at 32 knots (59 km/h)
- Complement: 186
- Sensors & processing systems: Radar Type 275 fire control on director Mk.VI
- Armament: 4 × QF 4.5 in (114 mm) L/45 guns Mark IV on mounts CP Mk.V; 2 × Bofors 40 mm L/60 guns on twin mount "Hazemeyer" Mk.IV; 4 × anti-aircraft mountings; Single Bofors 40 mm Mk.III; Single QF 2 - pdr Mk.VIII Mk.XVI; Single Oerlikon 20 mm P Mk.III; Twin Oerlikon 20 mm Mk.V; 8 (2x4) tubes for 21 inch (533 mm) torpedoes Mk.IX; 4 throwers and 2 racks for 96 depth charges

HMS Constance was a C-class destroyer of the Royal Navy launched on 22 June 1944.

After the war she was allocated to the 8th Destroyer squadron for service in the Far East. This included deployments as part of United Nations operations, as part of the Korean War. She returned from the Far East and was listed for disposal in 1955. She was sold to Thos. W. Ward for scrapping at Inverkeithing, arriving there on 8 March 1956.

== Publications ==
- Colledge, J. J.; Warlow, Ben (2006) [1969]. Ships of the Royal Navy: The Complete Record of All Fighting Ships of the Royal Navy from the 15th Century to the Present (3rd Rev ed.). London: Chatham Publishing. ISBN 978-1-86176-281-8. OCLC 67375475.
