= HMS Cumberland (F85) =

1989 Type 22 or Broadsword class frigate of the Royal Navy

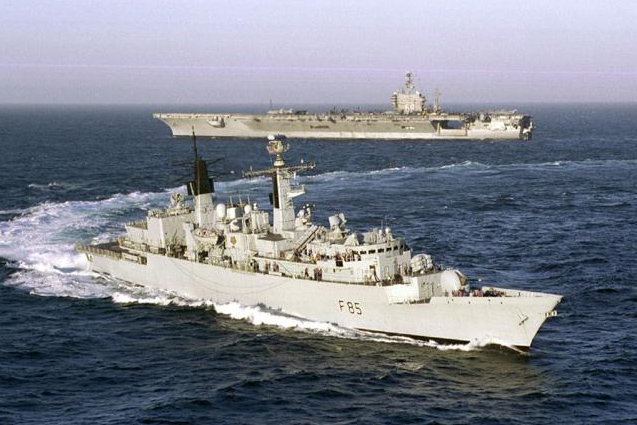
- HMS Cumberland and USS Dwight D. Eisenhower

History

United Kingdom
- Name: HMS Cumberland
- Operator: Royal Navy
- Builder: Yarrow Shipbuilders
- Laid down: 12 October 1984
- Launched: 21 June 1986
- Commissioned: 10 June 1989
- Decommissioned: 23 June 2011
- Home port: HMNB Devonport, Plymouth
- Identification: Pennant number: F85; IMO number: 4907127; International callsign: GAAP
- Motto: Latin Justitia Tenax; ("Tenacious of Justice")
- Nickname(s): The Fighting Sausage (after the Cumberland sausage)
- Fate: Sold for scrap November 2013
- Badge

General characteristics
- Class & type: Type 22 frigate
- Displacement: 5,300 tons
- Length: 148.1 m (486 ft 9 in)
- Beam: 14.8 m (48 ft 6 in)
- Draught: 6.4 m (21 ft)
- Propulsion: 2 × Rolls-Royce Marine Spey gas turbines (high speed); 2 × Rolls-Royce Tyne gas turbines (cruising)
- Speed: 18 knots (33 km/h; 21 mph) (cruise); 30 knots (56 km/h; 35 mph) (max)
- Complement: 250 (max. 301)
- Armament: 2 × Sea Wolf anti air system (Total of 72 Sea Wolf missiles); 2 × Quad Harpoon missile launchers (total of 8 Harpoons); 2 × triple Ship Torpedo Weapon System (STWS) tubes firing Stingray ASW torpedoes (total of 36 torpedoes); 1 × 4.5-inch (114 mm) Mk.8 gun; 2 × 20 mm GAM-BO1 guns; 1 × Goalkeeper CIWS; NATO Seagnat Decoy Launchers
- Aircraft carried: 2 x Lynx Mk.8 helicopters (but only 1 Lynx in peacetime).; Armed with; 4 × Sea Skua anti-shipping missiles; 2 × Sting Ray anti-submarine torpedoes; 2 × Mk 11 depth charges; 2 × Machine guns

HMS Cumberland was a Batch 3 Type 22 frigate of the Royal Navy. She was launched in 1986 and commissioned on 10 June 1989. The frigate was on station during the First Gulf War and was part of the Devonport Flotilla based at Devonport Dockyard. Cumberland was decommissioned on 23 June 2011.

== History ==
On commissioning she became part of the 8th Frigate Squadron. Her first commanding officer was Captain Mike Gregory. Captain Gregory, a submariner, was previously awarded the OBE for the longest continuously submerged patrol in Royal Navy history.

The ship's first two deployments were to the US and Canada, in 1989 and 1990 respectively. The first in 1989 called at both Fort Lauderdale and Baltimore where the ship became the focus of an anti-nuclear protest over suspicions that the ship carried nuclear weapons. In 1990, she again crossed the Atlantic to visit New York, before sailing North to the St Lawrence Seaway with a brief stop in Montreal followed by a 10-day visit to Toronto. This was followed by an unscheduled 24-hour stop in Halifax, Nova Scotia to repair some ship equipment damaged in bad weather, and then a visit to St John's, Newfoundland.

She spent the winter of 1990–91 as the Royal Navy surface vessel patrolling the Falkland Islands. She sailed to South Georgia just before Christmas arriving at Grytviken on 22 December. She sailed along the coast of South Georgia and returned to Grytviken on Christmas Eve. On Christmas Day she hosted the soldiers of the South Georgia garrison aboard for Christmas Day lunch of venison. The stag had been shot the day before by a sniper from the garrison; part of the garrison's duties being to control the deer population on the Island. While in South Georgia the ship manoeuvred into Cumberland Bay where a glacier sweeps into the sea. A photograph of the ship with the glacier as a back-drop was taken from the ship's Lynx helicopter. Ice was collected from the glacier and kept in the ship's freezers for use at cocktail parties during the return leg of her patrol.

On 26 September 2000, Cumberland worked with local fishermen to aid the rescue of survivors of the Greek ferry Express Samina which ran aground two miles off the island of Paros.

In 2003 Cumberland embarked two teams from M Squadron, Special Boat Service (SBS) and (in partnership with RFA Wave Knight) seized 3.6 tonnes of cocaine in the mid-Atlantic as part of an anti-drug operation. In October 2005 she intercepted and boarded a speedboat in the Caribbean Sea off Nicaragua from which they seized two tonnes of cocaine, and detained four suspects. The cocaine was estimated to have a street value of £200 million.

During this time Chris Cranmer, the first registered Satanist serving in the Royal Navy, was a technician on board the vessel. On 18 May 2006 Cumberland escorted Dee Caffari, sailing Aviva, across the finish-line (at Lizard Point) as she became the first woman to sail single-handedly non-stop around the world "the wrong way" (against the prevailing wind and tide).

Cumberland completed an 18-month refit in 2008.

In October 2008, Cumberland was assigned to anti-piracy duties along with 6 other ships as part of Standing NATO Maritime Group 2 (SNMG2). As part of her duties in SNMG2, on 11 November 2008, Cumberland went to the aid of a Danish vessel that had come under attack from pirates. The pirates opened fire on two of Cumberland's launches; 3 pirates died when the Royal Marines returned fire on the dhow.

During her 2010 deployment to the Persian Gulf, Cumberland rotated between maritime security patrol duty and escort duty with the French nuclear-powered aircraft carrier Charles de Gaulle in support of coalition military operations in Afghanistan. This represented an example of interoperability pursuant to the recently ratified Franco-British defence co-operation treaty.

In February 2011, it was announced that the ship would be scrapped in April 2011 in a government spending review to meet UK government cuts to the MOD.

=== Libya operations ===
On 22 February 2011, British Foreign Secretary William Hague announced that Cumberland, while transiting the Mediterranean on her return to the UK for decommissioning, would be redeployed to Libyan waters to assist in Operation Deference, the evacuation of British citizens and other nationals affected by the 2011 Libyan civil war. Cumberland entered the Port of Benghazi on 24 February. The ship left the same day with an international collection of 454 passengers that included 129 British nationals plus European and American nationals, and transferred them to safety in Malta. All European Union citizens were entitled to rescue by the Cumberland, but needed to carry a passport or other document that could serve as proof of nationality; would-be passengers were advised to telephone the British embassy in Malta.

In March 2011, Cumberland took part in Operation Ellamy, the British role in the coalition action during the 2011 Libyan civil war by enforcing a naval blockade. The life of the Cumberland has been extended so that the UK "armed forces remain equipped to protect in this conflict."

Since frigates HMS Westminster and Cumberland began enforcing the United Nations Resolution with other Allied naval forces on Friday [18 March 2011], the dictator's ships had shown "a very marked reluctance" to leave their bases... As well as ensuring arms do not slip through the naval cordon drawn across the Gulf of Sirte, both ships are using their surveillance suites to monitor activities along the Libyan coast, providing vital intelligence for the overall mission. Both frigates remain on station off the Libyan coast in full defence posture – defence watches, anti-flash, upper deck guns manned.

Cumberland was transferred to Operation Unified Protector under NATO command at the end of March.

== Decommissioning and disposal ==
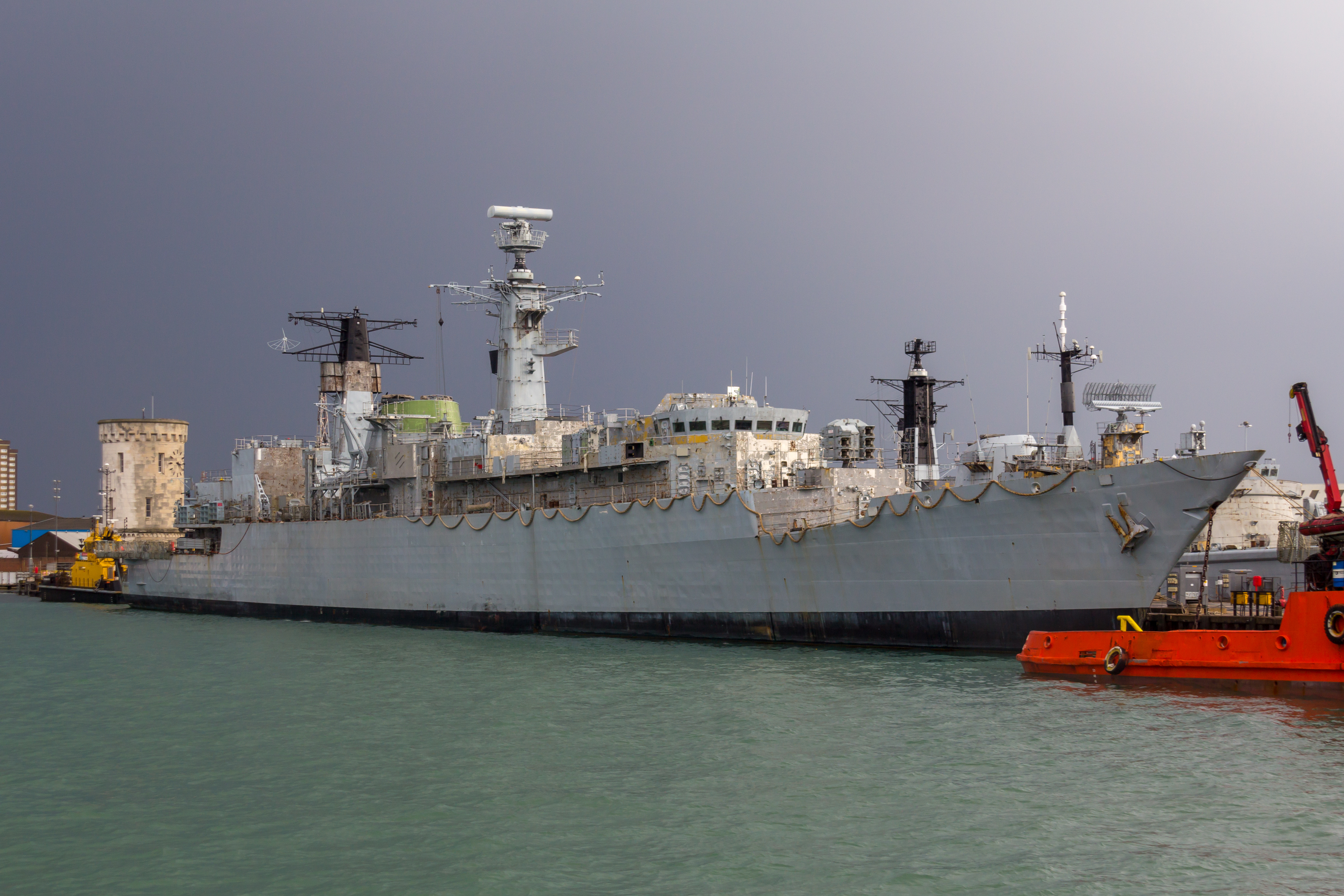
Cumberland being decommissioned at Portsmouth in 2013

On 18 April 2011 Cumberland made her final entry into her base-port of Devonport from an intense and successful patrol involving oil production protection in the Gulf, counter-piracy operations, evacuating refugees from Libya and enforcing an arms embargo against the country's ruler. The ship was decommissioned under the Strategic Defence and Security Review, with a decommissioning ceremony taking place on 23 June. She was laid up at Portsmouth and in July 2013 sold to Turkish company Leyal for demolition.

== Affiliations ==
Cumberland was affiliated with a number of military and civic bodies:

- The Duke of Lancaster's Regiment (King's, Lancashire and Border)
- County of Cumbria
- Worshipful Company of Glovers
- The Cumberland Association
- The Cumberland Hotel (Marble Arch)
- Pride of Cumbria air ambulance
- Royal Thames Yacht Club
- Batchworth Sea Scouts
- TS John Paul (Sea Cadets)
- TS Rodney (Sea Cadets)
- TS Royalist (Sea Cadets)
- Sedbergh CCF (Combined Cadet Force)
- St Dunstan's CCF
- Roedean School
- TS Cumberland – The City of Carlisle Sea Cadets ( Sea Cadets) www.carlisleseacadets.org
