= Richard Bridges =

Richard Bridges may refer to:

- Richard Brydges (1500–1558), English politician
- Richard Bridges (organ builder) (died 1758), English organ builder
- Richard J. Bridges (born 1955), American pharmacologist
