= 9th Frigate Squadron =

- Active: 1965 – March 1993
- Country: United Kingdom
- Branch: Royal Navy
- Size: Squadron

Commanders
- First: Captain William C. McKnight
- Last: Captain James F. Perowne

The 9th Frigate Squadron was an administrative unit of the Royal Navy from 1985 to 1993.

== Squadron commander ==
Commander	Ship	Dates
Captain William C. McKnight	HMS Brave	1985-March 1987
Captain Fabian M. Malbon	HMS Brave	March 1987-August 1988
Captain Andrew B. Gough	HMS Brave	August 1987-December 1989
Captain Jonathon Band	HMS Norfolk	1989–1991
Captain R.John Lippiett	HMS Norfolk	1991–1992
Captain James F. Perowne	HMS Norfolk	1992-March 1993

== See also ==
- List of squadrons and flotillas of the Royal Navy
