= James Perowne =

Royal Navy Admiral (born 1947)

Admiral Sir James Perowne KCVO KBE
- Born: 29 July 1947 (age 79)
- Military career
- Allegiance: United Kingdom
- Branch: Royal Navy
- Service years: 1969–2002
- Rank: Admiral
- Commands: Deputy Supreme Allied Commander Atlantic; Commander Operations; 6th Frigate Squadron; 9th Frigate Squadron; HMS Norfolk; 2nd Submarine Squadron; HMS Boxer; HMS Superb; HMS Opportune
- Awards: Knight Commander of the Royal Victorian Order; Knight Commander of the Order of the British Empire
- Other work: Constable and Governor of Windsor Castle

Admiral Sir James Francis Perowne, KCVO, KBE (born 29 July 1947) is a former Royal Navy officer who served as Deputy Supreme Allied Commander Atlantic from 1998 to 2002.

== Naval career ==
Educated at Sherborne School, and the Royal Naval College, Dartmouth, Perowne joined the Royal Navy in 1969. He was given command of the submarine HMS Opportune in 1976, the submarine HMS Superb in 1981 and the frigate HMS Boxer in 1986. He went on to be Commander of the 2nd Submarine Squadron in 1990, Commanding Officer of the frigate HMS Norfolk as well as Captain of the 9th Frigate Squadron in 1992 and Commanding Officer of the frigate HMS Norfolk as well as Captain of the 6th Frigate Squadron in 1993. He then became Senior Naval Member on the Directing Staff at the Royal College of Defence Studies in 1995, Commander Operations and Flag officer Submarines in 1996 and Deputy Supreme Allied Commander Atlantic in 1998. He retired in 2002.

== Retirement ==
In retirement Perowne became Chairman of the Council of the British Red Cross Queen Mother Memorial Fund and Chairman of the Central Region of the Consumer Council for Water.

In 2014 Perowne was appointed Constable and Governor of Windsor Castle. On his relinquishment of this position in 2022, he was appointed a Knight Commander of the Royal Victorian Order (KCVO) on 19 July 2022.

== Family ==
In 1971 Perowne married Susan Anne Holloway; they had four sons. Following the dissolution of his first marriage, he married Caroline Nicola Grimson in 1992.

Military offices
Preceded by Roger Lane-Nott	Commander Operations; 1996–1998	Succeeded by Robert Stevens
Preceded by Sir Ian Garnett	Deputy Supreme Allied Commander Atlantic; 1998–2002	Succeeded by Sir Ian Forbes
Honorary titles
Preceded by Sir Ian Macfadyen	Constable and Governor of Windsor Castle; 2014–2022	Succeeded by Philip Jones
