= Jeremy Blackham =

Royal Navy Vice-Admiral (born 1943)

Vice Admiral Sir Jeremy Blackham KCB
- Born: 10 September 1943 (age 83)
- Military career
- Allegiance: United Kingdom
- Branch: Royal Navy
- Service years: 1961–2002
- Rank: Vice Admiral
- Commands: Royal Naval College, Greenwich; HMS Ark Royal; HMS Nottingham; HMS Ashanti; HMS Beachampton
- Conflicts: Bosnian War
- Awards: Knight Commander of the Order of the Bath

Vice Admiral Sir Jeremy Joe Blackham, KCB (born 10 September 1943) is a former Royal Navy officer who served as Deputy Commander-in-Chief Fleet.

== Naval career ==
Blackham joined the Royal Navy in 1961. He became commanding officer successively of the Ton-class minesweeper HMS Beachampton, the frigate HMS Ashanti and then the destroyer HMS Nottingham. He was appointed Director of the Royal Navy Staff College in 1986, Director of Naval Plans at the Ministry of Defence in 1989 and then Commanding Officer of the aircraft carrier HMS Ark Royal, which was deployed in the Adriatic Sea at the start of the Bosnian War in 1992, before becoming Chief of Staff at Naval Home Command in 1993. He went on to be Director-General of Naval Personnel Strategy at the Ministry of Defence before being made Assistant Chief of the Naval Staff (and, concurrently, President of the Royal Naval College, Greenwich) in 1995. His last appointments were as Deputy Commander-in-Chief Fleet in 1997 and then Deputy Chief of the Defence Staff (Equipment Capability) in 1999 before retiring in 2002.

In retirement Blackham became UK President of EADS, the defence contractor. Since January 2003 he has served as editor of The Naval Review.

Military offices
Preceded by John Brigstocke	Assistant Chief of the Naval Staff; 1995–1997	Succeeded by Jonathon Band
Preceded by Sir Jonathan Tod	Deputy Commander-in-Chief Fleet; 1997–1999	Succeeded by Sir Fabian Malbon
Preceded by Sir Edmund Burton	Deputy Chief of the Defence Staff (Equipment Capability); 1999–2002	Succeeded by Sir Jock Stirrup
