= Fabian Malbon =

British Royal Navy officer (1946–2026)

Vice Admiral Sir Fabian Malbon KBE
- Born: 1 October 1946
- Died: 17 January 2026 (aged 79)
- Military career
- Allegiance: United Kingdom
- Branch: Royal Navy
- Service years: 1965–2002
- Rank: Vice Admiral
- Commands: HMS Invincible; 9th Frigate Squadron; HMS Brave; HMS Torquay
- Conflicts: Bosnian War
- Awards: Knight Commander of the Order of the British Empire
- Other work: Lieutenant Governor of Guernsey (2005–11)

Vice Admiral Sir Fabian Malbon, KBE (1 October 1946 – 17 January 2026) was a Royal Navy officer who also served as the Lieutenant Governor of Guernsey from 2005 to 2011.

== Early life and naval career ==
Educated at Brighton Hove and Sussex Grammar School, Malbon joined the Royal Navy in 1965. He went on to command the frigates HMS Torquay and HMS Brave. He was made Commanding Officer of HMS Brave as well as Captain of the 9th Frigate Squadron in 1987 and Director of Naval Service Conditions in 1988. During the Bosnian War, as commanding officer of HMS Invincible, he provided air-to-air combat, close air support and photo-reconnaissance over Bosnia-Herzegovina in 1993. He went on to be Naval Secretary in 1996 and Deputy Commander-in-Chief Fleet in 1999. He retired in 2002.

Malbon was made Lieutenant Governor of Guernsey on 18 October 2005.

== Personal life and death ==
Malbon and his wife, Sue, had three sons. He died on 17 January 2026, at the age of 79.

Military offices
Preceded by Alan West	Naval Secretary; 1996–1998	Succeeded by Jeremy de Halpert
Preceded by Sir Jeremy Blackham	Deputy Commander-in-Chief Fleet; 1999–2001	Succeeded by Sir Jonathon Band
Government offices
Preceded by Sir John Foley	Lieutenant Governor of Guernsey; 2005–2011	Succeeded by Peter Walker
