= Philip Jones (British Army officer) =

British Army officer (b. 1961)

Lieutenant General Philip David Jones, CB, CBE (born 23 July 1961) is a retired British Army officer, who has served as Constable of Windsor Castle since 2022. He joined the British Army as an officer of the Royal Anglian Regiment, rising to become chief of staff to Supreme Allied Commander Transformation from 2013 to 2015.

Honorary titles
Preceded by James Perowne	Constable and Governor of Windsor Castle; 2022–present	Incumbent
