= HMS Exeter (D89) =

Destroyer of the Royal Navy

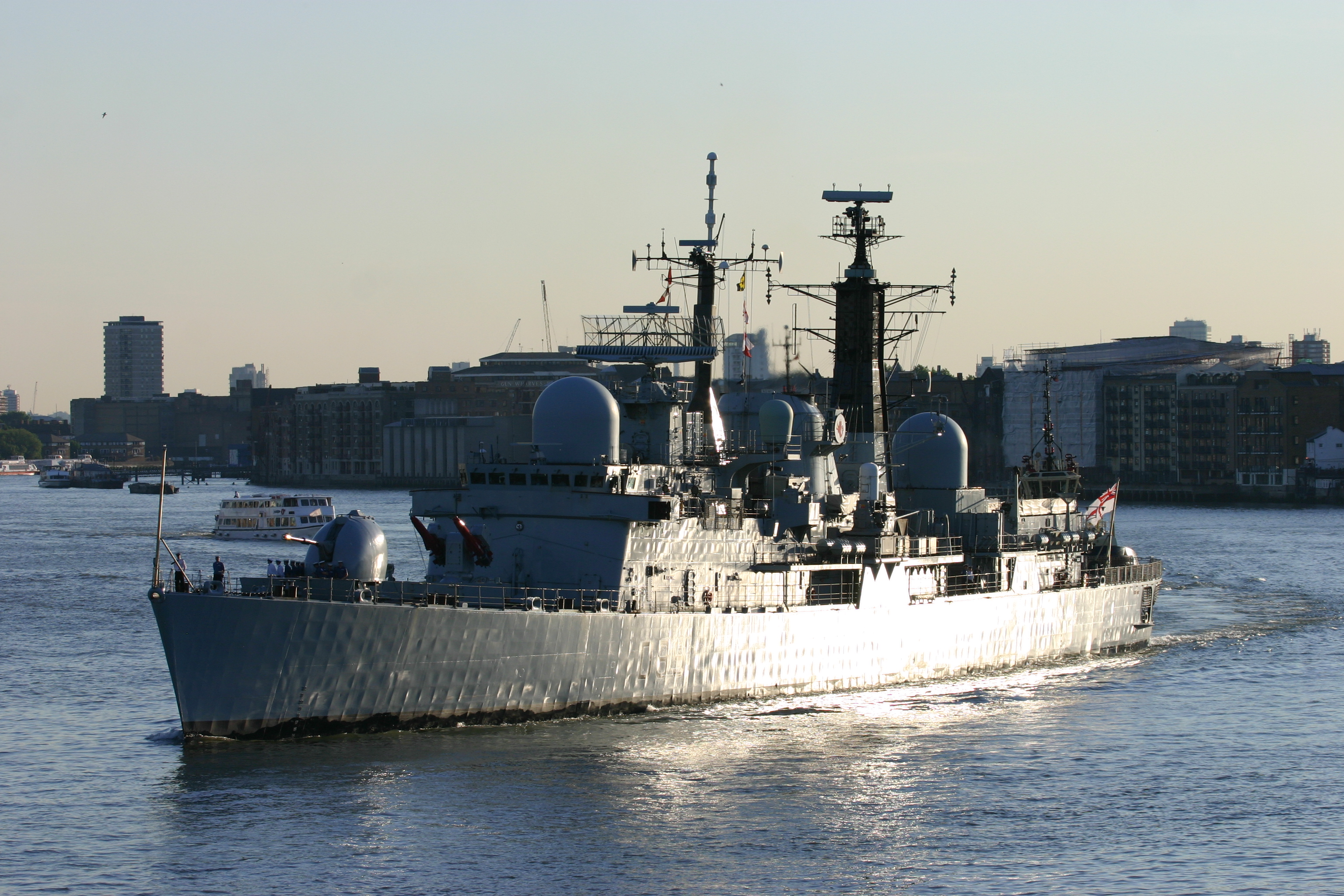
- HMS Exeter in the River Thames, sailing downstream past Limehouse, London.

History

United Kingdom
- Name: HMS Exeter
- Builder: Swan Hunter, Tyne and Wear, United Kingdom
- Laid down: 22 July 1976
- Launched: 25 April 1978
- Sponsored by: Lady Joan Mulley
- Commissioned: 19 September 1980
- Decommissioned: 27 May 2009
- Home port: Portsmouth
- Identification: Pennant number: D89; IMO number: 4907036
- Motto: Semper Fidelis ("Always faithful")
- Honours and awards: Falkland Islands 1982, Kuwait 1991
- Fate: Scrapped

General characteristics
- Class & type: Type 42 destroyer
- Displacement: 4,820 tonnes
- Length: 125 metres (410 ft)
- Beam: 14.3 metres (47 ft)
- Propulsion: COGOG (Combined Gas or Gas) configuration, 2 shafts; 2 x Rolls-Royce Olympus TM3B Gas Turbines (25000shp each) and 2 x Rolls-Royce Tyne RM1C Gas Turbines (5340bhp each) producing 36 MW (48,000 hp)
- Speed: 28.7 knots (53.2 km/h; 33.0 mph)
- Range: 1900Nm at full speed. 4200Mn at optimal speed
- Complement: 287
- Time to activate: 4 hours
- Armament: Sea Dart missiles, removed November 2007; 4.5-inch (113 mm) Mk 8 gun; 2 x Phalanx CIWS; Stingray torpedoes
- Aircraft carried: Lynx HMA8
- Notes: Batch 2A version of Type 42 Destroyer

HMS Exeter was a Type 42 destroyer, the fifth ship of the Royal Navy to be named Exeter, after the city of Exeter in Devon. The vessel fought in the Falklands War and the first Gulf War; she was scrapped in 2011.

== Design and construction ==
Exeter was the first of the modified Batch 2 Type 42 destroyers, which incorporated weapons and sensor upgrades without hull modifications. She was the first British warship to carry the 1022, 992Q, and 1006 radars in a combined fit.

The ship was built by Swan Hunter and commissioned into the Royal Navy on 19 September 1980. In 1981, London fired the last Mk 1 Sea Slug missiles to enable Exeter's radars to integrate fully with the Sea Dart missile system for engaging high and low missile targets.

Early in her first commission, Exeter had a turquoise hull on and below the waterline, painted with an experimental copolymer coating available only in limited non-standard colours. The light-blue boot topping on the waterline was repainted to the standard brick red and black scheme during her first docking period after the Falklands War.

== Operational history ==
=== 1981 – 1990 ===
Exeter served in the Falklands War, deploying from the Caribbean after the loss of HMS Sheffield (D80) as a Type for Type replacement, under Captain Hugh Balfour. She provided area air defence for the task group using her Type 1022 radar and Sea Dart missile system. Exeter took station in the outer ring of the carrier screen, defending against Argentine strike aircraft approaching from the mainland.

On 30 May 1982 she engaged an Argentine strike force aimed at the carrier HMS Invincible (R05), downing two A-4C Skyhawks with Sea Dart. She is also reported to have engaged an Exocet missile during the same attack, although the outcome of this engagement is disputed. On 7 June she destroyed a reconnaissance Learjet 35A that had been shadowing the task force. On 13 June an Argentine Canberra B.62 was shot down west of Stanley with another Sea Dart.

Following the conflict, Exeter resumed routine Royal Navy and NATO deployments. From mid-1983 to mid-1984 she served under Captain George Tullis, operating primarily in the Atlantic and Mediterranean. Captain David Dobson assumed command in mid-1984, overseeing continued operational duties, including exercises and port visits across European and West African waters.

In April 1986 Exeter took part in Operation Clover, serving as Gibraltar Guardship until May and in July embarked, Lynx (XZ733) from 815 NAS. Captain Nigel Essenhigh took command in April 1989, maintaining operational readiness and deployments into the early 1990s.

=== 1991‑2000 ===
Exeter served in Operation Granby during the 1991 Gulf War, under the command of Captain Nigel Essenhigh. Among her roles was the defensive air cover of US battleships and the mine‑hunter group operating in the northern Gulf from hostile aircraft and missile threats using her Sea Dart system .

In autumn 1998, Exeter emerged from a major refit at Rosyth dockyard. The refit involved machinery overhaul, hull repairs, and upgrades to radar, sensors, and the Sea Dart weapons system. After post‑refit trials, she undertook Operational Sea Training in spring 1999 and participated in the Joint Maritime Course with Sea Dart live firings in June. In September 1999, Exeter deployed on Armilla patrol, remaining alongside in Dubai for the millennium before being relieved by a task group led by the aircraft carrier HMS Illustrious (R06) in February 2000, arriving back at Portsmouth the following month.

=== 2001–2008 ===
As the last remaining Royal Navy ship in commission to have served in the Falklands War, Exeter attended the 25th-anniversary commemorations in Newquay, Cornwall, in 2007.

In May 2008, Exeter served as the centrepiece for the launch of the James Bond novel Devil May Care, written by Sebastian Faulks. The day before its release, seven copies of the book were brought up the River Thames aboard a Royal Navy Rigid Raider, escorted by two Lynx helicopters, to a reception held on board the destroyer. Exeter was selected for the event because, in the fictional biography of James Bond, he had served on her as an intelligence officer, attaining the rank of Commander.

== Disposal ==
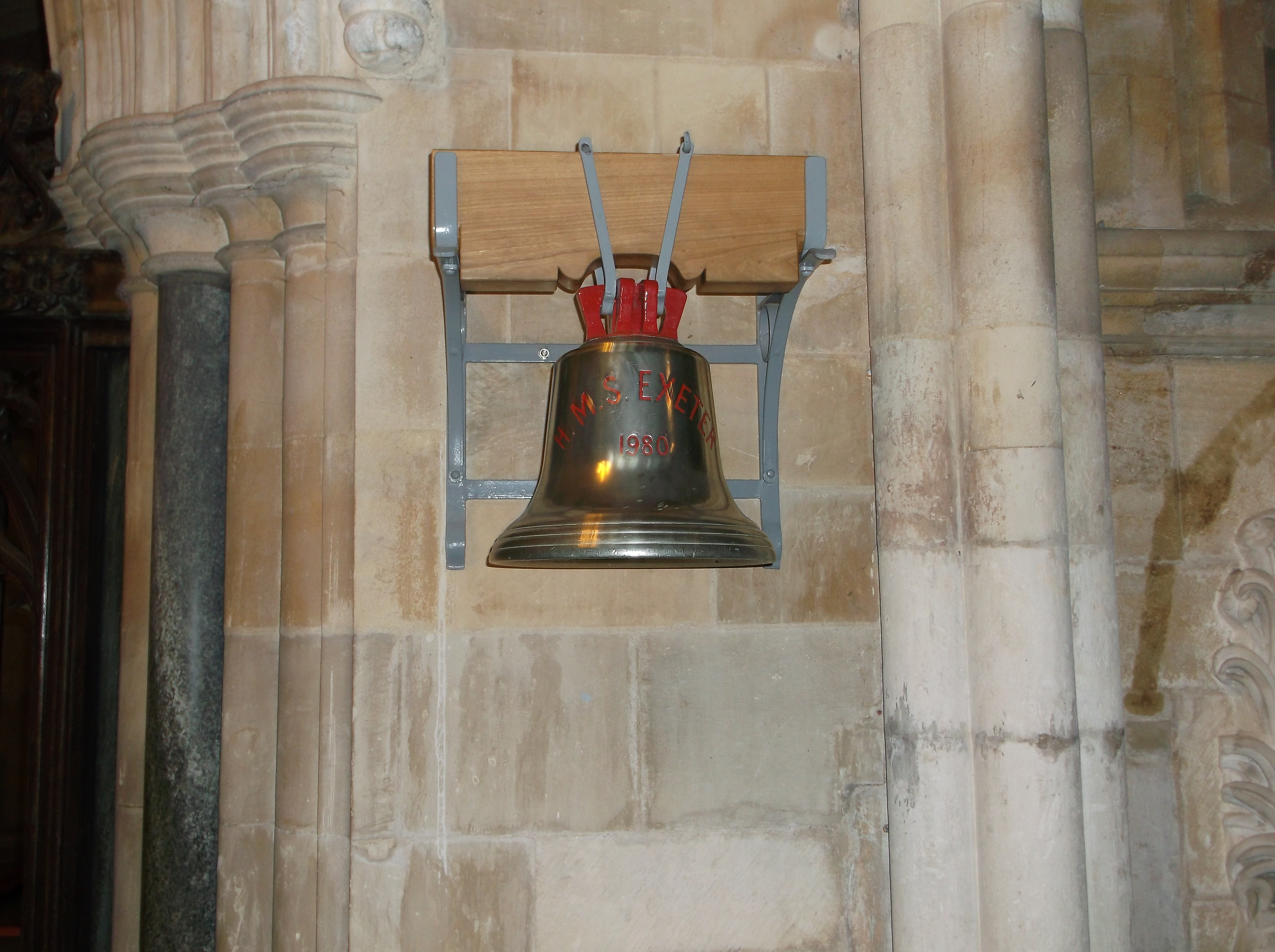
The ship's bell in Exeter Cathedral

On 30 July 2008, Exeter was placed in a state of extended readiness at HMNB Portsmouth, remaining there until being decommissioned on 27 May 2009.

In early 2010, Exeter was used to assist with the training of new naval base tugs. She was put up for sale by auction on 28 March 2011 and was subsequently towed away for scrapping at Leyal Ship Recycling in Turkey on 23 September 2011. This decision provoked criticism from former crew members, who expressed frustration that the Ministry of Defence had failed to inform them of the ship’s fate.

== Affiliations ==
- The Rifles – Infantry regiment of the British Army
- Exeter College, Oxford
- Worshipful Company of Plaisterers – Livery company of the City of London
