= International Scott Centenary Expedition 2012 =

Planned expedition to Antarctica

The International Scott Centenary Expedition 2012 was a planned expedition to Antarctica and the last tent site of Captain Robert Falcon Scott, to hold a memorial service on the centenary of his death. The patrons of the expedition included Jonathan Band. The expedition was to be led by Antony Jinman and Felicity Aston, who had previously led the Kaspersky Commonwealth Antarctic Expedition. The expedition's goal was to commemorate the death of Scott.

== Historical background ==
Robert Falcon Scott's British Antarctic Expedition took place from 1910 to 1913. The main objective, as expressed by Scott in his prospectus, was "To reach the South Pole and to secure for the British Empire the honour of this achievement". The expedition had further objectives in scientific research and geographical exploration and intended to make "... bagging the Pole merely an item in the results". To achieve this, Scott took with him an extensive team of scientists.

== The expedition ==
The expedition was to consist of two parties: a sledge team and a flight team. The sledge team would replicate the route of the search party that found Scott and his men. The flight party would include members of the Polar explorers’ families, patrons, and media.

In the event, no trace of the expedition having taken place can be found.

== See also ==
- Robert Falcon Scott
