= St Anne's Limehouse =

Coordinates: 51°30′42.1″N 0°1′49.03″W

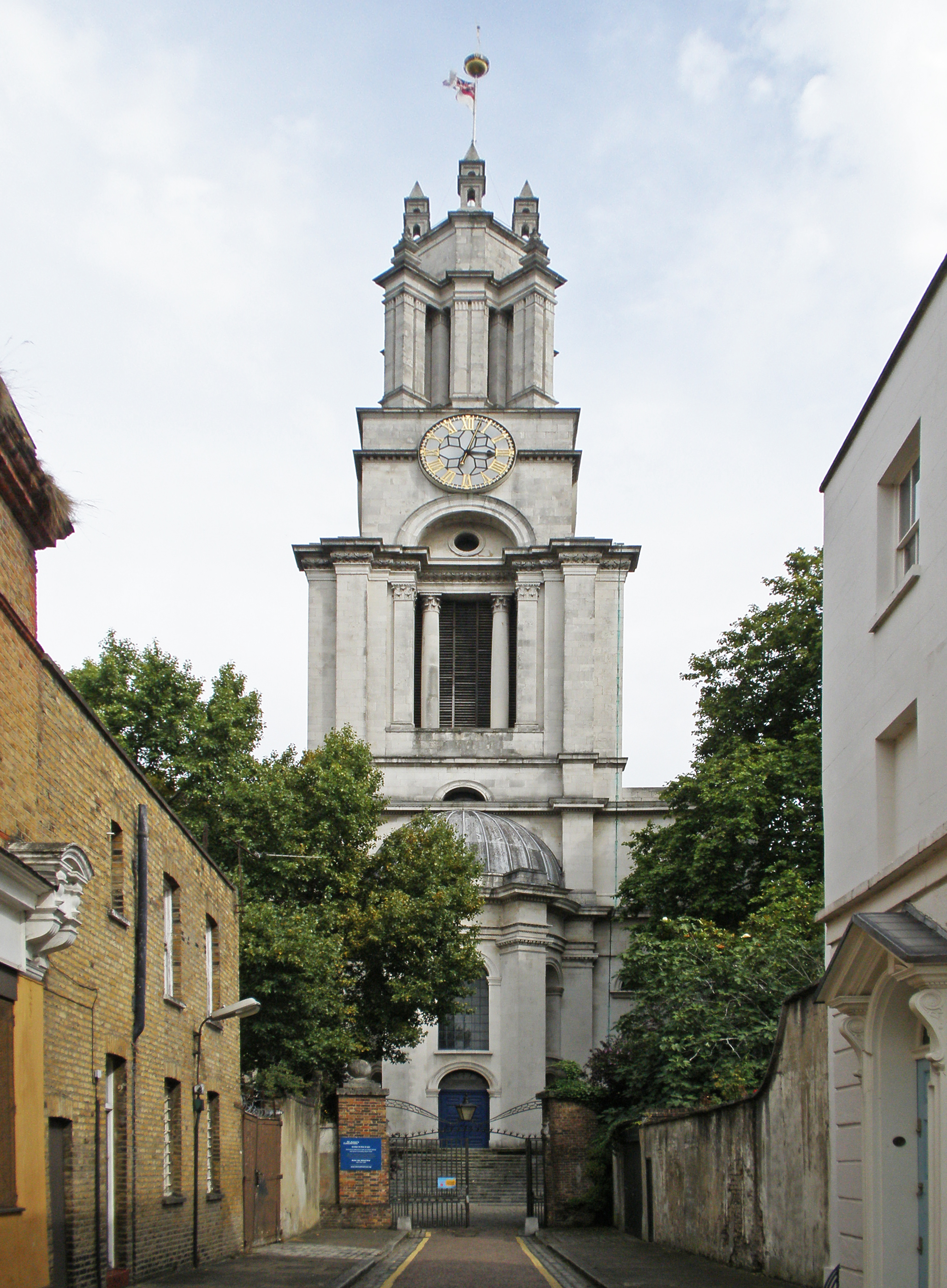
- St Anne's Limehouse
- Denomination: Church of England
- Churchmanship: Conservative Evangelical
- Website: Church website

Architecture
- Heritage designation: Grade I listed

Administration
- Province: Canterbury
- Diocese: London
- Deanery: Tower Hamlets Deanery
- Parish: Limehouse

Clergy
- Rector: The Revd Richard Bray

St Anne's Limehouse is a Hawksmoor Anglican Church in Limehouse, in the London Borough of Tower Hamlets. It was consecrated in 1730, one of the twelve churches built through the 1711 Act of Parliament.

== History ==
Limehouse Parish Act 1729
- Act of Parliament
- Parliament of Great Britain
- Long title: An Act for making the Hamlet of Limehouse, and Part of the Hamlet of Ratchiffe, in the Parish of St. Dunstan, Stebonheath, alias Stepney, in the County of Middlesex, a distinct Parish; and for providing a Maintenance for the Minister of the new Church there.
- Citation: 3 Geo. 2. c. 17
- Territorial extent: Great Britain

Dates
- Royal assent: 15 May 1730
- Commencement: 13 January 1730 (Note: Start of session.)
- Repealed
Other legislation
Repealed by	London Government (Borough of Deptford) Order in Council 1901

Status: Repealed

Text of statute as originally enacted

St Anne's Limehouse was formed by the Limehouse Parish Act 1729 (3 Geo. 2. c. 17) from part of the parish of St Dunstan's, Stepney, prior to the 18th century a large (but then thinly populated) East London parish that extended all the way down to the Thames River. As the population of London increased, growing parishes were subdivided. In 1709 a new parish in Limehouse was formed from part of the parish of St. Dunstan. The church may have been named after Queen Anne as she raised money for it by taxing coal passing along the River Thames.

The building was designed by Nicholas Hawksmoor, as one of twelve churches built to serve the needs of the rapidly expanding population of London in the 18th century. The scheme never approached its ambitious target of 50 churches, but those built were also known as the Queen Anne Churches. The building was completed in 1727 and consecrated in 1730. The church was built by Edward Strong the Younger a friend of Christopher Wren the Younger.

Queen Anne decreed that as the new church was close to the river it would be a convenient place of registry for sea captains to register vital events taking place at sea. Therefore, she gave St. Anne's Church the right to display the second most senior ensign of the Royal Navy, the White Ensign. The prominent tower with its golden ball on the flagpole became a Trinity House "sea mark" on navigational charts, and the Queen's Regulations still permit St. Anne's Limehouse to display the White Ensign 24 hours a day, 365 days a year.

The church was gutted by fire on Good Friday 1850, and restored between 1851 and 1854 by Philip Hardwick. It was further restored by Julian Harrap between 1983 and 1993, when tubular steel trusses were added to support the roof. The church was Grade I listed in 1950. St Anne's underwent extensive restoration during 2007–2009, including complete restoration of the organ and work on the altar and floor.

The original 1741 pipe organ, destroyed in the 1850 fire, was by Richard Bridge, modified by William Russell in 1799. The replacement organ, by Gray and Davison, won first prize in the Great Exhibition of 1851 at Crystal Palace, and is much prized by musicians. In 2009, the church became the main rehearsal venue for the recently formed Docklands Sinfonia, and occasionally hosts classical concerts. Today, the church remains the parish church of Limehouse, and is within the Diocese of London.

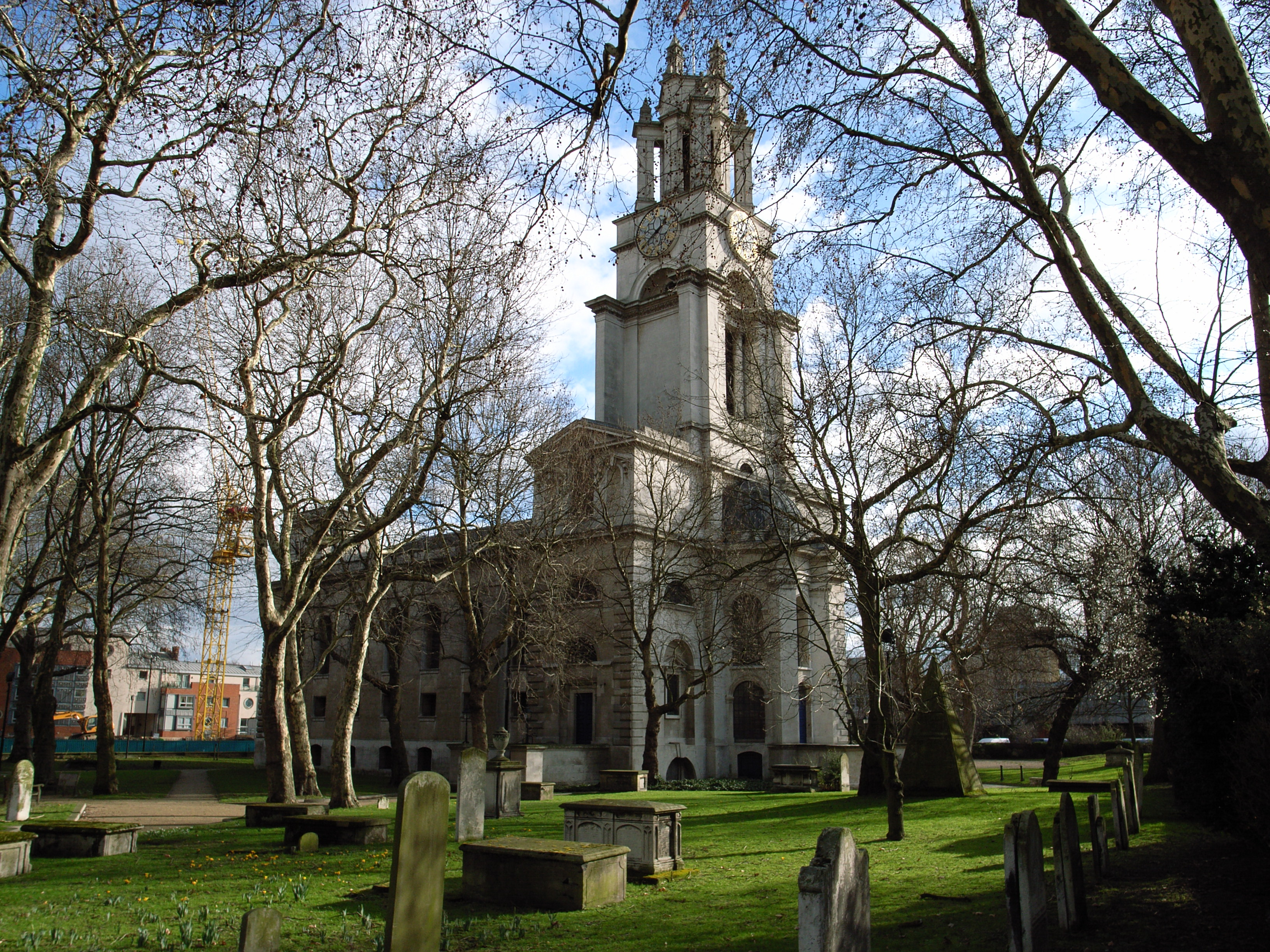
St Anne's viewed from the churchyard

After the churchyard closed to burials, it was converted to public gardens with the assistance of the Metropolitan Public Gardens Association. The garden was laid out by the Association's landscape gardener Fanny Wilkinson. She retained the notable stone pyramid by Hawksmoor, dating from c. 1730 and bearing the inscription "The wisdom of Solomon". Also located within the churchyard is a 1918 white stone war memorial with bronze figure of Christ. They are separately Grade II listed.

=== Present day ===
St Anne's is within the Conservative Evangelical tradition of the Church of England, and it receives alternative episcopal oversight from the Bishop of Ebbsfleet. It describes itself as, "A genuinely mixed East End Church with a passion for straightforward Bible teaching."

== Location ==
The church is next door to Limehouse Town Hall and close to Limehouse Library, both Grade II listed buildings, the former now used as a community centre. Across the road is the former Sailors' Mission, where Situationist International held its conference in 1960.

The address is: St Anne's Church, Three Colt Street, London E14 7HP

The nearest Docklands Light Railway station is Westferry.

== St Peter's Barge ==
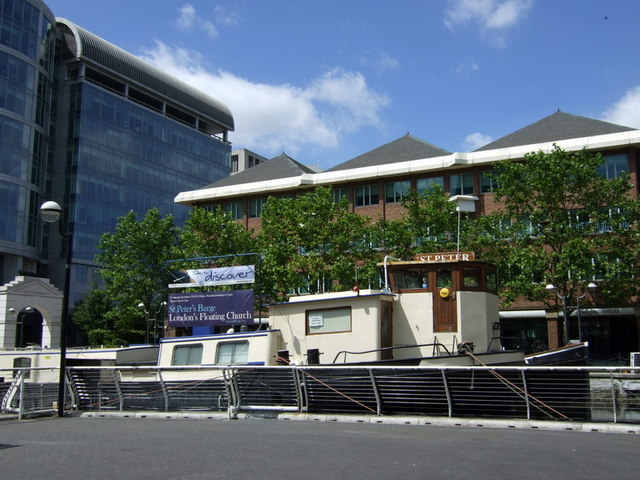
St Peter's Barge, Canary Wharf

With the redevelopment of the East London Docklands in the late 20th century, over 100,000 people work in the Canary Wharf estate, and a large part of this centre of business and finance lies within the parish of St Anne's Church. As a result, St Anne's began to run lunchtime meetings in pubs and wine bars to reach out to those working in the Wharf. This effort developed with the support of St Helen's Bishopsgate, but further growth was hampered for lack of a permanent venue on the site, which has high property values.

The idea to build a floating church was realised with the formation of the St Peter's Canary Wharf Trust and the purchase of a Dutch freight barge in 2003. The barge was refitted in the Netherlands and brought across the North Sea under its own power in the summer of that year – a journey which was chronicled in a BBC documentary shown in the autumn. The barge now has a permanent mooring at the heart of the West India Quay area.

A permanent full-time Church of England minister was appointed by the Trust in July 2004 and licensed by the area bishop to head the clergy. In September 2004 St Peter's launched a new Sunday evening congregation with its own programme of meetings and groups to serve the many thousands who now live in the area.

== Reception ==
Amid a 1734–1735 paper-war over architectural taste, the Grub Street Journal—writing under Batty Langley’s freemasonic persona “Hiram”—singled out St Anne’s as “a most surprising beautiful structure,” defending Nicholas Hawksmoor against the dismissals of The Weekly Register.

== See also ==
- List of churches and cathedrals of London
