= Docklands Sinfonia =

Docklands Sinfonia is a symphony orchestra in London's Docklands. Since January 2009, the orchestra has been based at St Anne's Limehouse near Canary Wharf.

== History ==
Docklands Sinfonia was formed in January 2009 by conductor Spencer Down and is the only symphony orchestra based in London's Docklands. The orchestra, which is made up of professional musicians, music college students and amateurs, is self-funding. The orchestra's patron is the former head of the Royal Navy Alan West, Baron West of Spithead. Docklands Sinfonia held its first rehearsal on Wednesday 14 January 2009 at St Anne's Limehouse. The orchestra's inaugural concert on Friday 13 March featured the world premieres of 'Machination 1' by British composer Andrew Keenan and 'The Sanctuary suite for Saxophone and Orchestra' by saxophonist Christian Forshaw. Forshaw's orchestral adaptation of his 'Sanctuary' album also featured baroque soprano Elin Manahan Thomas. The sell-out concert, which finished with Tchaikovsky's Fifth Symphony, was met with a full standing ovation by the audience. Following the success of its inaugural concert, Docklands Sinfonia was asked to film for the BBC1 music series 'Clash'. The first episode of the programme was screened on 7 July 2009. In November 2009, international cello virtuoso Leonard Elschenbroich, winner of the 2009 Leonard Bernstein award, performed the Dvorak cello concerto in B Minor with Docklands Sinfonia. For its first anniversary concert, Docklands Sinfonia performed Gustav Mahler's Symphony No 1 in D Minor. In July 2010, Docklands Sinfonia was rated as one of the top five non professional orchestras in London by Classical Music magazine.

== Conductor ==
Spencer Down is Docklands Sinfonia's conductor and founder. Spencer is Associate Conductor of the Junior Guildhall School of Music and Drama Symphony Orchestra, has taught conducting at the Royal Academy of Music summer school and adjudicated the London College of Music’s Wind and Brass Competitions. Currently working at the Junior Guildhall School of Music and Drama, he is brass co-ordinator, professor of euphonium and conductor. In 2008, he designed the Trinity Guildhall euphonium diploma syllabus. Down has conducted members of both the London Symphony Orchestra and Scottish Chamber Orchestra in educational projects. He is also musical director of the Kew Wind Orchestra, which claims to be one of Britain's leading amateur wind orchestras. In April 2008, the orchestra was given a rare consistent achievement award for winning three successive gold awards at the National Concert Band Festival Finals. Down has conducted in the United Kingdom’s major concert halls including the Royal Festival Hall, the Barbican, Symphony Hall Birmingham, Snape Maltings and the Sage Gateshead. Down is also the musical director of Pioneer Brass - a professional ensemble featuring some of Britain's leading orchestral and West End players. Down says his grandfather, who was a trumpeter and a shipwright in the old docks, was his inspiration for setting up Docklands Sinfonia. The conductor, who was brought up in Grays Essex, says his aim is to make the orchestra a 'major cultural force' in the Canary Wharf area. In August 2010, Down founded the first Kew Music Festival in Kew, Surrey. He is now musical director of the annual festival.

== Buckingham Palace ==
In May 2011, Docklands Sinfonia performed for The Queen in the ballroom of Buckingham Palace at a reception to celebrate youth in the performing arts. The orchestra was joined by performers from the English National Ballet, Royal Opera House, Joe McElderry, Ironik, Sara-Jane Skeete and Rumer during the 30-minute performance based around the theme of Romeo and Juliet.

== Royal Albert Hall ==
On 5 November 2010, the orchestra performed the world premiere of singer songwriter Imogen Heap's orchestral composition 'Love The Earth' at the Royal Albert Hall. The singer conducted the orchestra in a second performance of the piece on 3 December 2010 in St Anne's, Limehouse.

== Press coverage ==
Docklands Sinfonia has attracted media interest. In the run-up to its formation in September 2008, The East London Advertiser remarked that the area would soon have its "own posh symphony orchestra to rival anything in the West End." The orchestra has also had repeated mentions on LBC 97.3 by presenters Nick Ferrari and Andrew Pierce. On 14 January 2009, Classical Music magazine ran a feature on Docklands Sinfonia entitled 'Anchors Away'. The magazine wrote: "It may not be the most propitious time to be launching a new orchestra, but conductor Spencer Down is tackling it with infectious bravado." On 7 July 2009, Docklands Sinfonia made its first TV debut on the BBC1 series 'Clash'. It had been asked to film for the BBC programme just eight weeks after its first rehearsal. The BBC appearance prompted The Docklands newspaper to remark that the orchestra "now has the world at its feet". Classical Music magazine critic Hannah Nepil commented "This ensemble has something that even some professional orchestras struggle to maintain, real joy in the music-making."
