= Nigel Essenhigh =

Royal Navy Admiral (born 1944)

Admiral Sir Nigel Essenhigh GCB DL
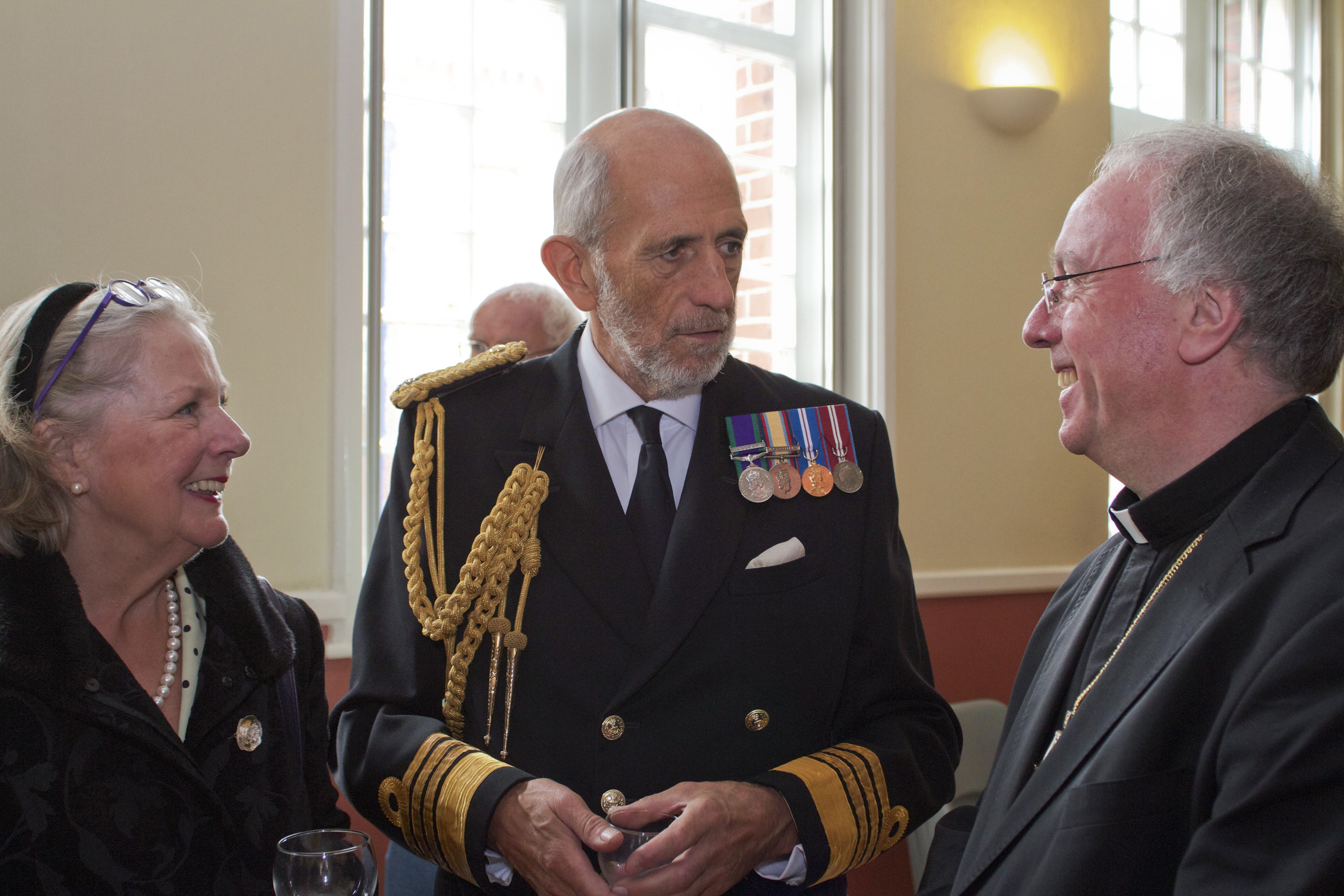
- Admiral Essenhigh (centre) in 2013
- Born: 8 November 1944 (age 81); Newcastle upon Tyne, England
- Military career
- Allegiance: United Kingdom
- Branch: Royal Navy
- Service years: 1963–2002
- Rank: Admiral
- Commands: First Sea Lord; Commander-in-Chief Fleet; HMS Exeter; HMS Nottingham
- Conflicts: Gulf War
- Awards: Knight Grand Cross of the Order of the Bath

Admiral Sir Nigel Richard Essenhigh GCB DL (born 8 November 1944) is a former Royal Navy officer who served as First Sea Lord and Chief of the Naval Staff from 2001 to 2002. He served as a navigating officer before commanding the Type 42 destroyer HMS Nottingham and then the Type 42 destroyer HMS Exeter during the Gulf War. As First Sea Lord he entered into a contract to acquire up to 150 Joint Strike Fighter aircraft for the UK's two new aircraft carriers. In retirement he worked for Northrop Grumman and became a non-executive director of Babcock International. He remains a Deputy Lieutenant of Devon.

== Naval career ==
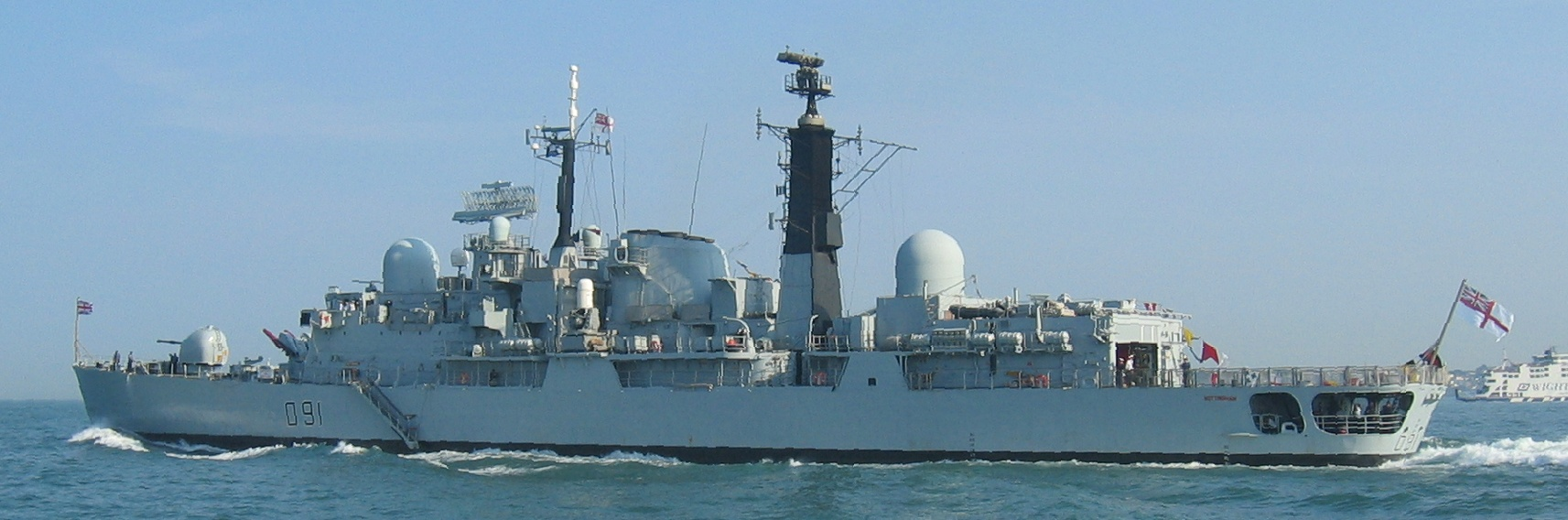
The destroyer HMS Nottingham which Essenhigh commanded during the early 1980s

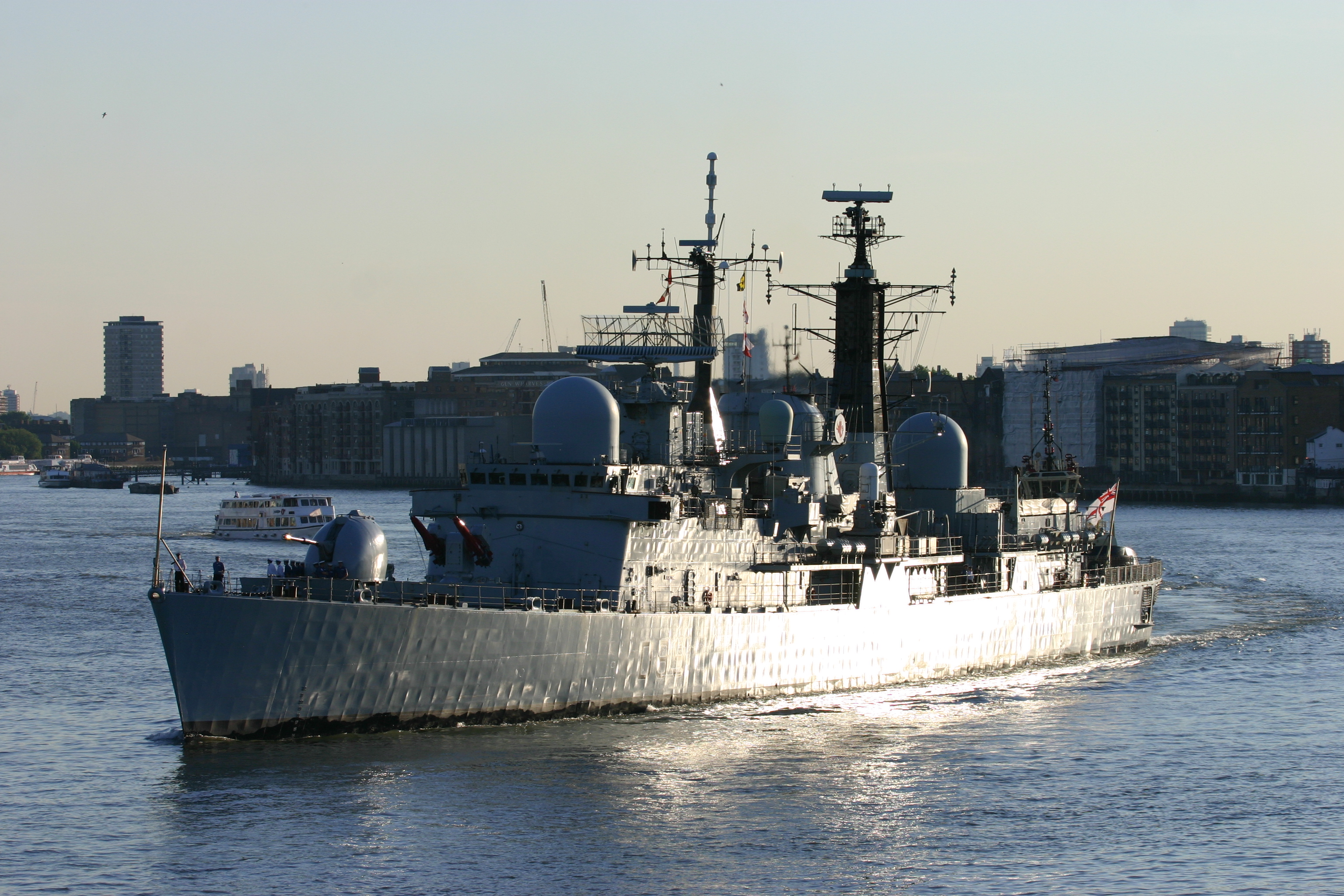
The destroyer HMS Exeter which Essenhigh commanded during the Gulf War

Essenhigh was born in Newcastle upon Tyne and educated at St. Cuthbert's School. He joined the Royal Navy in 1963, and was promoted to sub-lieutenant on 4 June 1965 and to lieutenant on 1 May 1967. He qualified as a principal warfare officer in 1972, specialising in navigation. He served as a navigating officer on the frigate HMS Juno and then the destroyer HMS Antrim before joining the staff of the Flag Officer Sea Training. Promoted to lieutenant commander on 1 May 1975, he was posted to the destroyer HMS Glasgow in 1978.

After his promotion to commander on 31 December 1980, Essenhigh joined the Ministry of Defence for duty with Naval Manpower Training: he worked on the 1981 Defence Review. He took command of the Type 42 destroyer HMS Nottingham in 1982 and saw service in the Atlantic, Mediterranean and West Indies. His next post was on board HMS Ark Royal during its construction in 1984. Promoted to captain on 31 December 1985, he attended the Royal College of Defence Studies in 1986 and then returned to the Ministry of Defence to be Assistant Director (Weapons and Ships) in the Naval Plans Department in 1987. He took command of another Type 42 destroyer, HMS Exeter, in April 1989, and saw operational service during the Gulf War.

Essenhigh attended the Higher Command and Staff Course at the Staff College, Camberley in 1992 before being promoted to commodore and becoming Director of Naval Plans and Programmes at the Ministry of Defence later that year. Following promotion to rear admiral, he took up the position of Hydrographer of the Navy in February 1994, and was subsequently Assistant Chief of Defence Staff (Programmes) from March 1996. In September 1998 he was promoted to full admiral and was appointed to the post of Commander-in-Chief Fleet as well as NATO Commander-in-Chief Eastern Atlantic and NATO Commander Allied Naval Forces North West Europe. He was appointed a Knight Commander of the Order of the Bath in the 1999 Birthday Honours.

In January 2001 he became First Sea Lord and Chief of the Naval Staff. In that role he entered into a contract to acquire up to 150 Joint Strike Fighter aircraft for the UK's two new aircraft carriers. He was advanced to Knight Grand Cross of the Order of the Bath in the 2002 Birthday Honours and retired on 3 December 2002.

== Later career and family ==
In retirement Essenhigh became an advisor to Northrop Grumman and from 2010 to 2011 he was chief executive of its Information Systems Europe business, involved in the supply of command, control, and intelligence and counter-IED products to customers throughout Europe. He was also a non-executive director of Babcock International and Patron of Journey South 2007, an expedition to the South Pole. He has an interest in local matters and he remains a Deputy Lieutenant of Devon. His wife Susie is sponsor of the frigate HMS St Albans. His son Rear Admiral Angus Essenhigh served as the fourth captain of the aircraft carrier HMS Queen Elizabeth from January 2020 and was appointed national hydrographer in July 2023.

=== As essayist ===
On 13 June 2015, after the previous month's general elections, and together with Admiral of the Fleet Lord Boyce, Field Marshal Lord Walker and Air Chief Marshal Sir Peter Squire, he painted the UK Armed Forces as "feeble" and said "We are appeasing our enemies and making the same mistakes as in the 1930s during the rise of Nazism." He characterised the status quo as "parlous", argued for a review that would be "policy-led" as opposed to "resource-driven" and closed with an appeal for a review that "must demonstrate to potential enemies that Britain continues to be a country that will not be coerced into submission through military weakness when diplomacy fails in the future, as it did in the Thirties." The essay garnered at least two responses:

- A journalistic report that restated Essenhigh's case, and noted that the Chancellor sought sweeping cuts, while Squire added that "Russia must now be the number one and major threat. What is going on in Eastern Europe, in Ukraine and so forth, could spill over into a major conflict" and Boyce reiterated that "Putin is behaving in a very aggressive and expansionist way and the Government does not seem to take it seriously because it is inconvenient to have to do something about it."
- A direct response from Secretary of State for Defence Michael Fallon, that "Our Armed Forces are anything but 'feeble'". Fallon reiterated the government position that the international aid for law enforcement and women's rights budget should also be taken into account, as he said that "Those who belittle our Armed Forces’ efforts fail to recognise that our national security depends on tackling the causes of instability, not just treating the symptoms."

Military offices
| Preceded by Sir Michael Boyce | Commander-in-Chief Fleet; 1998–2000 | Succeeded by Sir Alan West |
| Preceded by Sir Michael Boyce | First Sea Lord; 2001–2002 | Succeeded by Sir Alan West |
