= Jonathon Band =

Royal Navy Admiral (born 1950)

Admiral Sir Jonathon Band GCB DL
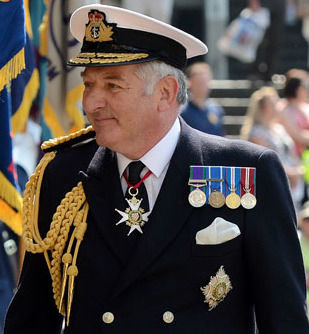
- Admiral Band in 2014
- Born: 2 February 1950 (age 76)
- Military career
- Allegiance: United Kingdom
- Branch: Royal Navy
- Service years: 1967–2009
- Rank: Admiral
- Commands: First Sea Lord; Commander-in-Chief Fleet; HMS Illustrious; HMS Norfolk; HMS Phoebe; HMS Soberton
- Conflicts: Falklands War; Bosnian War; Iraq War
- Awards: Knight Grand Cross of the Order of the Bath

Admiral Sir Jonathon Band, GCB, DL (born 2 February 1950) is a retired Royal Navy officer who was the First Sea Lord and Chief of the Naval Staff from 2006 to 2009. Before serving as First Sea Lord he was Commander-in-Chief Fleet. Since becoming First Sea Lord, Band had been a firm advocate of the creation of new ships to meet new threats and maintain the status of the Royal Navy as one of the world's leading naval forces.

== Early life ==
Born the son of Victor and Muriel Band, Band attended two independent schools: Brambletye School, a preparatory school, in Ashurst Wood, West Sussex, and from the age of thirteen, Haileybury and Imperial Service College. He entered the Royal Navy in 1967, before undertaking sea training in the Far East. He returned to the UK on an undergraduate programme and studied for three years at the University of Exeter, gaining a BA in 1972.

== Early naval career ==
After graduating from Exeter, Band served in junior officer appointments in HMS Lewiston and HMS Rothesay. He was confirmed in the rank of sub-lieutenant on 1 September 1971. In the mid 1970s, he undertook an exchange programme with the United States Navy and served on board the guided missile cruiser, USS Belknap, which is now no longer in service. He was promoted to lieutenant on 30 January 1974. Following warfare training in 1976 and 1977 he served for two years as the principal warfare officer and operations officer on board the frigate HMS Eskimo. This appointment included deployments to the West Indies and South Atlantic.

From 1979 and 1981 he commanded the minesweeper HMS Soberton for nearly two years in the Fishery Protection Squadron around the British coast. Between 1981 and 1983 he also served as flag lieutenant to Commander-in-Chief Fleet, a period where he was involved in the Falklands War. Promoted to the rank of commander on 30 June 1983, he assumed command of the frigate HMS Phoebe. The frigate operated in NATO waters, at the time of the RN’s first operational experience with surface ship towed passive sonar. In 1985 he attended the Joint Services Defence College and was soon appointed to the Defence Staff in the Ministry of Defence in the Directorate of Defence Policy. Promoted to captain on 30 June 1988, he left the Directorate of Policy and commanded HMS Norfolk. He was also responsible for helping re-equip 9th Frigate Squadron, the first Type 23 frigate squadron.

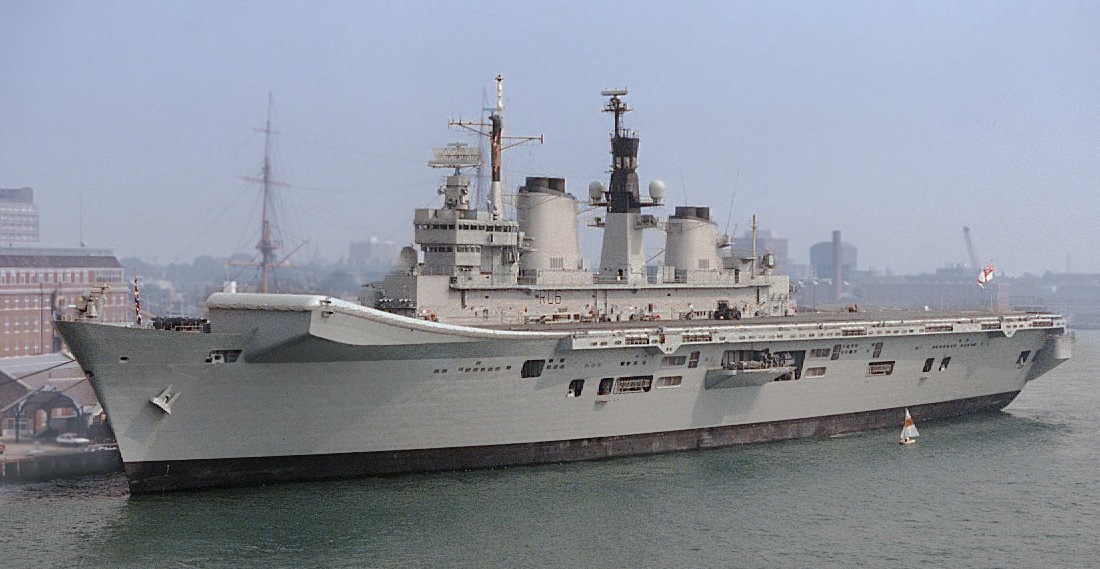
The aircraft carrier HMS Illustrious which Band commanded during the Bosnian War

In 1991, he became the Assistant Director Navy Plans and Programmes in the Ministry of Defence, a period that saw the implementation of the "Options for Change" Review. In 1994 he was a member of the Defence Costs Study (Front Line First) Secretariat. He was appointed Aide-de-Camp to the Queen on 9 April 1995. His last sea command was that of HMS Illustrious, the aircraft carrier, between 1995 and 1997. The period included two operational deployments to the Adriatic in which he and Illustrious supported the intervention of the U.S., the United Nations, and NATO operations in Bosnia.

In May 1997 he was elevated to flag rank and promoted to rear admiral. He returned to the Ministry of Defence as Assistant Chief of the Naval Staff. This appointment included the period of the Strategic Defence Review, in which he was heavily involved in the Royal Navy's contributions to the review. He left this appointment in December 1999 and assumed the position of team leader of the Defence Education and Training Study in January 2000 with the rank of vice admiral.

== Commander-in-Chief Fleet ==
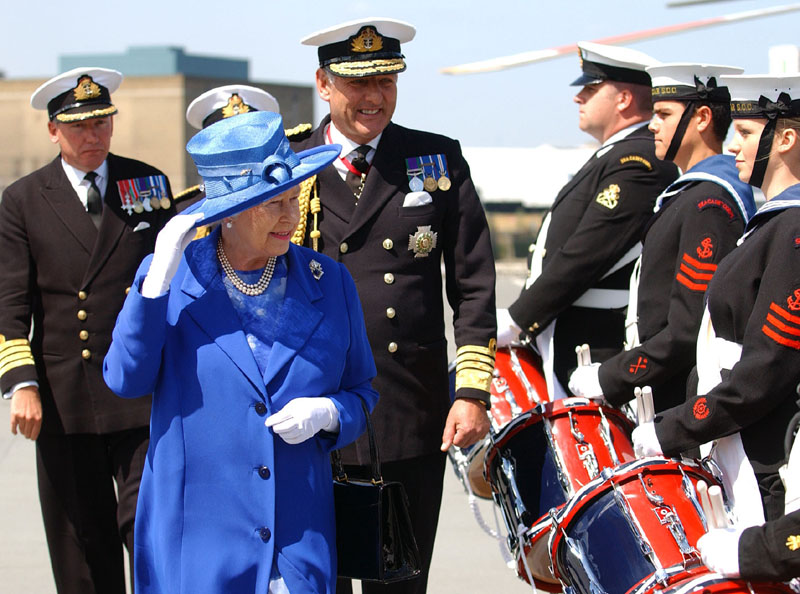
Admiral Band with Queen Elizabeth II in 2006

After a tour as Deputy Commander-in-Chief Fleet from May 2001, Band was promoted to full admiral and served as Commander-in-Chief Fleet, responsible for the preparation and operation of the ships, submarines and aircraft of the Royal Navy based at Northwood between August 2002 and November 2005. In that post he was involved in the planning of the Iraq War and also had a NATO command as Commander Allied Maritime Component Command, Northwood. He was appointed a Knight Commander of the Order of the Bath (KCB) in the 2002 New Year Honours.

In 2003 he spoke out for the crew of HMS Turbulent, for their efforts on achieving the longest deployment time of a submarine. Turbulent was away for more than ten months and he stated "They are a huge credit. The submarine has done the equivalent of going twice around the world." In March 2004 he spent several weeks touring naval facilities and ships in the Caribbean, including Antigua.

In the Trafalgar 200 celebrations, celebrating the British victory at the Battle of Trafalgar in 1805, Band attended the ceremonies and the fleet review in the UK. In an interview, he stated:

Trafalgar 200 is important internationally. It celebrates the fact that mariners are a great club of people who have a joint respect for the sea. There is no greater connecting medium in the world than the ocean, and it unites us

— Jonathan Band, Interview with BBC News, 2006

== First Sea Lord ==
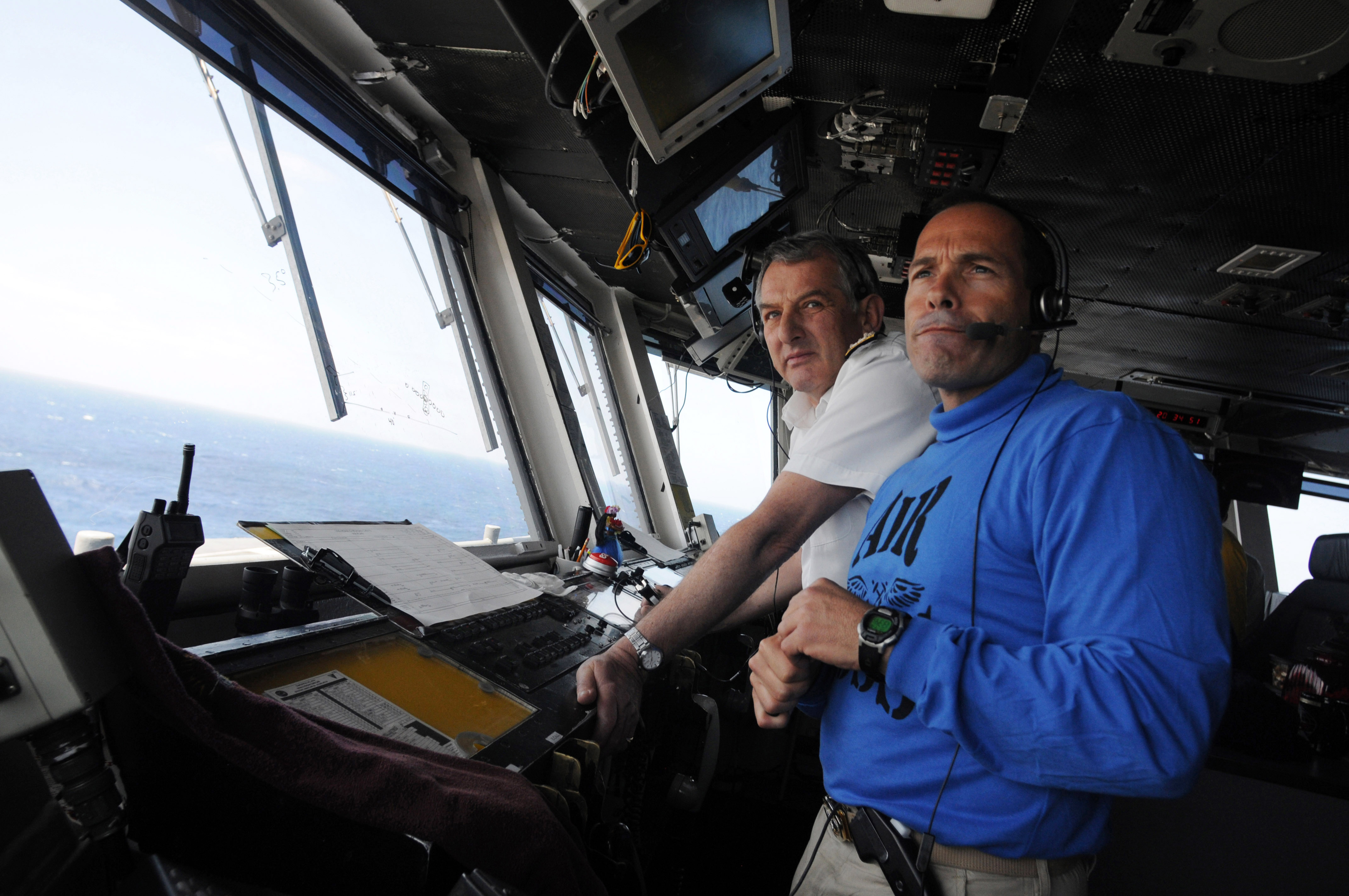
Band aboard USS Ronald Reagan (April 2009)

In February 2006 Band took over the positions of First Sea Lord and Chief of Naval Staff from Admiral Sir Alan West and in a press statement set out the Navy's priorities in the 21st century. Upon taking up the post of First Sea Lord he became the professional head of the Royal Navy. Band is a proponent for the Sustained surface combatant capability and the creation of new ships to maintain the Royal Navy as one of the world's leading navies. These include the new Type 45 destroyer and the Royal Navy CVF programme, designed to replace the UK's current aircraft carriers.

In June 2006 he went on a fact finding and diplomatic mission to Pakistan where he met the head of the Pakistan Air Force, the head of the Pakistan Navy and the Army Chief of Staff. On the following day he met with the President of Sri Lanka Mahinda Rajapaksa. In November 2006 he attended a press conference on HMS Illustrious, which was moored in the River Thames at Greenwich. He announced that the 25th anniversary of the Falklands War would be commemorated across 8,000 miles and four time zones – in London, Pangbourne and the Falkland Islands – from 14 to 17 June 2007.

In February 2007, at a journalists' briefing, he warned that the Royal Navy needed another £1 billion to meet future foreign policy demands and appealed to the Government for additional funding, a third of the navy's annual operating budget, to spend on building more modern ships. In a later interview with the Daily Telegraph he said that an increase of more than 30 per cent in the fleet's day-to-day budget was necessary to pay for better sailors' wages, the running of ships and improved accommodation. He threatened to resign as head of the navy if the Government failed to agree to pay for two new aircraft carriers – the Royal Navy CVF programme, which it had previously promised.

In May 2007 the Government gave the £3.9bn go-ahead for the new aircraft carriers. Band said:

This is a significant decision to invest in the future, to be able to deliver air power around the world. I am entirely content that the country will get the navy it deserves; a powerful navy for the future; which is entirely right because we are a large player on the world scene.

— Jonathan Band, Interview with the Guardian, 2007

In 2007 he was awarded an honorary degree in law from the University of Portsmouth. He was appointed Knight Grand Cross of the Order of the Bath in the 2008 Birthday Honours and succeeded by Mark Stanhope as First Sea Lord on 21 July 2009.

== Later professional life ==
Band became a Deputy Lieutenant of Hampshire on 27 November 2009 and a non-executive director of the cruise company Carnival Corporation & plc, in April 2010. He has served on the Boards of Directors of Carnival Corporation and Carnival plc. He is Chair of Carnival's Health, Environmental, Safety & Security Committees.

Band has also become a non-executive director of the British arm of the American defence contractor Lockheed Martin who produce the F35-B aircraft which will be utilized on the new aircraft carriers. He is also a defence adviser at British defence firm Babcock International and a non-executive director of military consultancy Survitec Group.

Band was a patron of the International Scott Centenary Expedition 2012; its aim was to commemorate the 100th anniversary of Scott's race to the South Pole and the subsequent deaths of the polar party on the Ross Ice Shelf.

Band is a Younger Brother of Trinity House and a liveryman of the Shipwrights' Company. Band is also President of the 1805 Club.

== Personal life ==
In 1979 he married Sarah Asbury: they have two daughters and live in Southsea, Portsmouth. He is Patron of the local residents association (the Southsea Association).

Military offices
Preceded by Jeremy Blackham	Assistant Chief of the Naval Staff; 1997–1999	Succeeded by James Burnell-Nugent
Preceded by Sir Fabian Malbon	Deputy Commander-in-Chief Fleet; 2001–2002	Succeeded by Sir Mark Stanhope
Preceded by Sir Alan West	Commander-in-Chief Fleet; 2002–2005	Succeeded by Sir James Burnell-Nugent
Preceded by Sir Alan West	First Sea Lord; 2006–2009	Succeeded by Sir Mark Stanhope
