= Alan West, Baron West of Spithead =

Retired Royal Navy Admiral and life peer (born 1948)

Admiral The Right Honourable The Lord West of Spithead GCB DSC PC
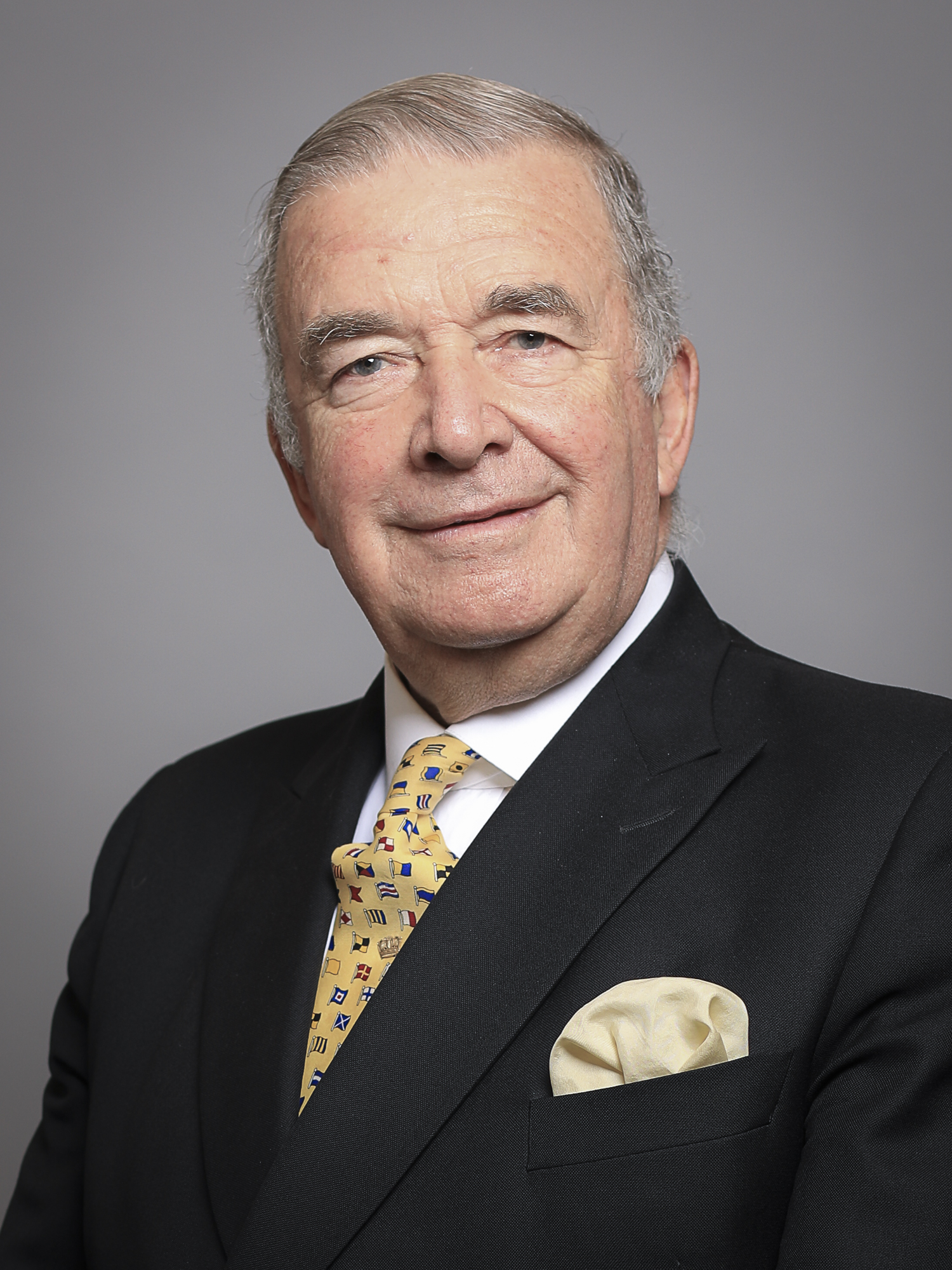
- Official portrait, 2020

Parliamentary Under-Secretary of State for Security and Counter-Terrorism
- In office 28 June 2007 – 11 May 2010
- Prime Minister: Gordon Brown
- Preceded by: Tony McNulty
- Succeeded by: The Baroness Neville-Jones

First Sea Lord and Chief of the Naval Staff
- In office September 2002 – February 2006
- Prime Minister: Tony Blair
- Preceded by: Sir Nigel Essenhigh
- Succeeded by: Sir Jonathon Band

Chancellor of Solent University
- In office 28 June 2006 – 1 October 2018
- Deputy: Professor Graham Baldwin
- Succeeded by: Theo Paphitis

Member of the House of Lords
- Lord Temporal
- Life peerage 9 July 2007

Personal details
- Born: Alan William John West; 21 April 1948 (age 78) London, United Kingdom
- Party: Labour
- Spouse: Rosemary Anne Linington Childs (m. 1973)
- Children: 3

Military service
- Allegiance: United Kingdom
- Branch: Royal Navy
- Years: 1965–2006
- Rank: Admiral
- Commands: First Sea Lord; Commander-in-Chief Fleet; Chief of Defence Intelligence; COMUKTG; Director of Naval Staff Duties; HMS Bristol; HMS Ardent; HMS Yarnton
- Wars: Falklands War; Iraq War
- Awards: Knight Grand Cross of the Order of the Bath; Distinguished Service Cross

Alan William John West, Baron West of Spithead, GCB, DSC, PC (born 21 April 1948) is a retired admiral of the Royal Navy and formerly, from June 2007 to May 2010, a Labour Parliamentary Under-Secretary of State at the British Home Office with responsibility for security and a security advisor to Prime Minister Gordon Brown. Prior to his ministerial appointment, he was First Sea Lord and Chief of the Naval Staff from 2002 to 2006.

== Early career in the Royal Navy ==
West was born on 21 April 1948 in Lambeth, London, and was educated at Windsor Grammar School and Clydebank High School. He joined Britannia Royal Naval College in 1965 and served in HMS Albion during her standby duty for the Nigerian Civil War and circumnavigated the globe in HMS Whitby, taking part in the Beira Patrol. He was confirmed as a sub-lieutenant on 1 September 1969, and promoted to lieutenant on 1 May 1970. After his command of the Ton-class minesweeper HMS Yarnton in Hong Kong in 1973, he qualified as a principal warfare officer in 1975 and then served as operations officer in the frigate HMS Juno in 1976 and then the frigate HMS Ambuscade in 1977. Promoted to lieutenant commander on 1 April 1978, he attended the Royal Navy Staff College that year and then qualified as an advanced warfare officer before being posted to the destroyer HMS Norfolk in 1979.

In 1980 he was promoted to commander and took command of the frigate HMS Ardent, and deployed to the Indian Ocean taking part in the first Armilla Patrol. In 1982 he laid a wreath off Norway, on the spot inside the Arctic Circle where the previous Ardent had been sunk in 1940 by the German battleships Scharnhorst and Gneisenau. Shortly after, the ship deployed to the South Atlantic for the Falklands War, where she was sunk in Falkland Sound on 21 May during the successful retaking of the islands. West was the last to leave the sinking ship and was subsequently awarded the Distinguished Service Cross for his leadership. West led the victory parade through the City of London on return from the Falkland Islands. He remains the President of the HMS Ardent Association. He was promoted to captain on 30 June 1985.

In 1986, while working on the Naval Staff at the Ministry of Defence, West left documents detailing large cuts to the Navy on a canal towpath. These documents were recovered and then published by a journalist from The Mail on Sunday. At a subsequent court martial West pleaded guilty to charges of negligence and breaching security. He explained that they had fallen from his coat pocket whilst walking a friend's dog. West was issued with a severe reprimand, the second lightest sentence available. The reprimand was time expired before he became eligible for promotion to flag rank.

== Senior Royal Navy career ==
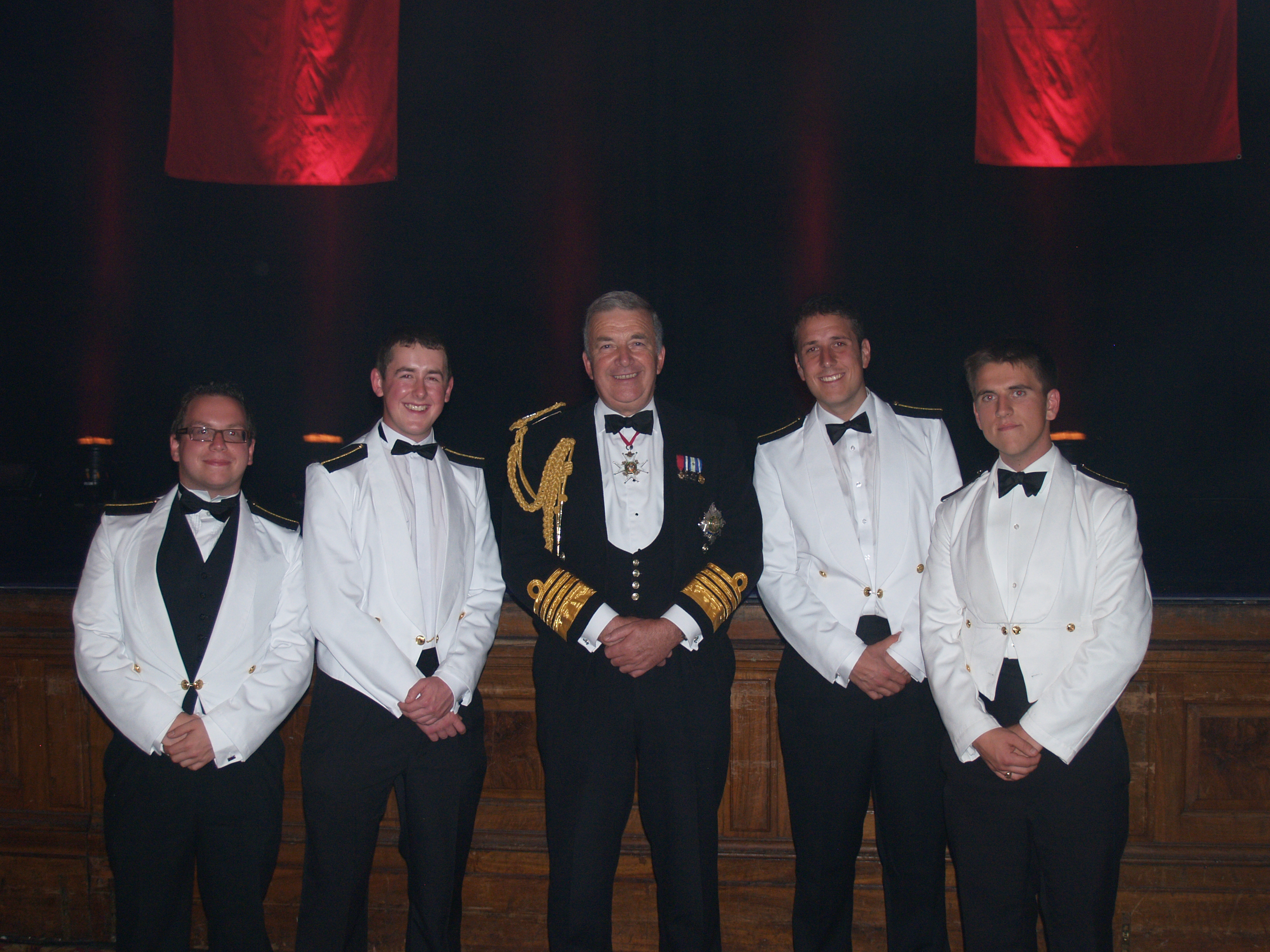
The Former First Sea Lord in his capacity as Chancellor of Southampton Solent University with graduating British Merchant Navy officers in 2011

In 1987 he was given command of HMS Bristol and the Dartmouth training squadron in March of that year and led the study into employment of women at sea before spending three years as head of naval intelligence rewriting the NATO intelligence manual after the collapse of the Soviet Union. In 1992 he attended the Royal College of Defence Studies, where he produced a Seaford House Paper on why the UK needed a 'Grand Strategy'. He attended the Higher Command and Staff Course at the Staff College, Camberley in 1993 before being promoted to commodore and becoming Director of Naval Staff Duties at the Ministry of Defence later that year.

West became rear admiral on appointment as Naval Secretary in March 1994, responsible for officer appointing and also naval manning and moved its organisation from London to Portsmouth. In February 1996 he became Commander United Kingdom Task Group deploying to the Gulf for the first UK fighter patrols over Iraq (conducted by Sea Harrier FA2) and to the South China Sea to cover the withdrawal from Hong Kong (Operation OceanWave).

In October 1997 he was promoted to vice admiral and Chief of Defence Intelligence. He was responsible for the move of the Intelligence school from Ashford to Chicksands, and provision of intelligence to the Chiefs of Staff on operations in Sierra Leone, East Timor, Operation Desert Fox in Iraq, and the Kosovo War. West was created a Knight Commander of the Order of the Bath in the 2000 New Year Honours. He became a full admiral in November 2000 when he took up the post of Commander-in-Chief Fleet, NATO Commander-in-Chief East Atlantic and NATO Commander Allied Naval Forces North. West co-ordinated the naval response to the September 11 attacks in the North Arabian Sea and Afghanistan.

== First Sea Lord ==
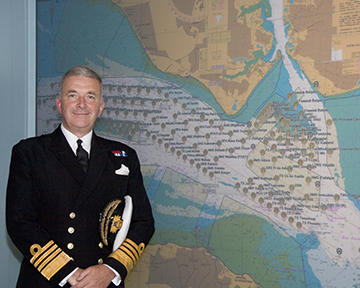
Admiral Sir Alan West, then First Sea Lord, is pictured with the official chart of anchorages for the International Fleet Review

West was appointed as First Sea Lord and Chief of the Naval Staff in September 2002. He was also a member of the Defence Council and Admiralty Board as well as First and Principal Naval Aide-de-Camp to the Queen. In his role he had overall responsibility for fighting effectiveness and morale of the Naval Service (Royal Navy, Royal Marines, Royal Fleet Auxiliary and medical services) for the successful operations on the US right flank in the invasion of Iraq.

During his time as First Sea Lord, West implemented the defence white paper entitled Delivering Security in a Changing World which proposed cutting three Type 23 frigates, three Type 42 destroyers, four nuclear submarines, six minehunters and reducing the planned purchase of Type 45 destroyers from twelve to eight. In a message to the Royal Navy, West said "We must continue the shift in emphasis away from measuring strength in terms of hull numbers and towards the delivery of military effects... I am confident that these changes will leave the Navy better organised and equipped to face the challenges of the future."

In 2004, he appeared on BBC Radio 4 and spoke about Trafalgar 200. Trafalgar 200 was a celebration of the 200th anniversary of the Battle of Trafalgar. It saw an international fleet in the Solent reviewed by Queen Elizabeth II and the First Sea Lord. West led the demand by the Royal Navy for a major ceremony. He is credited with persuading the government to make the event include a large-scale fleet review. In 2005 he served as the chief mourner at a reenactment of Horatio Nelson's funeral. In the 2004 New Year Honours, he was advanced to a Knight Grand Cross of the Order of the Bath. He completed his term as First Sea Lord on 6 February 2006 and was succeeded by Admiral Sir Jonathon Band.

== Post-naval career ==
West was installed as the first Chancellor for Southampton Solent University (formerly Southampton Institute and more recently Solent University) on 28 June 2006, appointed to the board of the Imperial War Museum on 6 July 2006 and made chairman of the advisory board of defence contractor QinetiQ in October 2006. West left his role at Southampton Solent University in summer 2018 after the graduation ceremonies.

In April 2010 West also became patron of the Docklands Sinfonia symphony orchestra. In 2014 he presented the 15-part BBC Radio 4 series "Britain at Sea". He has been, since at least November 2014, a member of the Henry Jackson Society's Political Council. He is also a non-executive chairman of Spearfish Maritime Security.

== Political life ==
On 29 June 2007, West was appointed Parliamentary Under-Secretary of State at the British Home Office, with responsibility for security in the administration of Gordon Brown, and that same day Brown announced that West was to be created a life peer. On 9 July 2007, he was created Baron West of Spithead, of Seaview in the County of Isle of Wight, and took his seat in the House of Lords. In November 2007 he told the BBC Radio 4 Today programme that he was not "totally convinced" of the need for 42-day detention (without trial) of terrorist suspects. But less than two hours later, following a meeting with the prime minister, he said he was "convinced" of the need for the new legislation. The incident was an embarrassment for the government, particularly as West was the minister charged with navigating the controversial Counter-Terrorism Act 2008 through the House of Lords. During his time with the Home Office, he produced the United Kingdom's first-ever National Security Strategy (as trailed in his Seaford House paper of 1992) and Cyber Security strategy as well as formulating a series of other new strategies: the counter-terrorist policy, cyber security, chemical, biological radiological and nuclear security, science and technology for countering international terrorism and guidance for local government in enhancing the security of crowded places. In May 2010, Lord West departed the Home Office.

=== Post-Home Office ===
In September 2011, he contributed to a book entitled What Next for Labour? Ideas for a New Generation; in his piece he highlights his view that defence spending under Tony Blair was insufficient. In August 2014, West was one of 200 public figures who were signatories to a letter to The Guardian opposing Scottish independence in the run-up to September's referendum on that issue.

In 2014, he challenged Michael Gove to a boxing match after Gove's reported comments ahead of the centenary commemorations that left-wing academics were spreading unpatriotic myths about the First World War via programmes like Blackadder.

In the wake of the June 2015 Sousse attack, he said Britain must step up the "propaganda war" against the Islamic State of Iraq and the Levant (ISIL). "They are running rings around us in terms of the social media they are putting out." He also suggested the West should consider working with Syrian president Bashar al-Assad, whom he qualified as a "loathsome man", while he called for Britain to consider joining the US in conducting air strikes against ISIL targets in Syria.

In January 2016, following news emerging about serious power and propulsion problems with the Royal Navy Type 45 destroyer, West argued it was a "national disgrace" that the Navy only had 19 destroyers and frigates. In August 2016, he described the issues facing the MoD post-Brexit as a "perfect storm", insisting that there were great difficulties for the British military as a result of Britain's exit from the European Union.

In April 2018, he expressed doubts as to whether Assad's government perpetrated the alleged Douma chemical attack and dismissed the White Helmets as having "a history of doing propaganda for the opposition forces in Syria". On BBC Television News he said, "When I was Chief of Defence Intelligence I had huge pressure put on me politically to try and say that our bombing campaign in Bosnia was achieving all sorts of things which it wasn't. I was put under huge pressure. So I know the things that can happen with 'intelligence', and I would just like to be absolutely sure."

In October 2020, he said migrants arriving in the UK across the English Channel should be put in "a concentrated place, whether it's a camp or whatever", prompting outrage.

West's commentaries on foreign militaries, such as his assessment on the strategic weaknesses of Russia's armed forces, have been distributed by news agencies such as Times Radio.

In January 2025, West backed a report calling on the UK government to halt a deal that will hand sovereignty of the Chagos Islands to Mauritius.

In December 2025, West joined the four-episode docudrama Titanic Sinks Tonight aired on BBC Two, giving professional input about the sinking of the Titanic.

== Personal life ==
In 1973, West married Rosemary Anne Linington Childs, who died in 2026; they have two sons and one daughter. West said that during one overseas posting in a foreign country, the bugging of communications and accommodation was so widespread that Rosemary would say "Goodnight everybody" before turning off the light to sleep.

West has admitted during security vetting to an extramarital affair, and was forced to respond to rumours in 2007 about his friendship with Anni-Frid Lyngstad of ABBA with "I'm not having an affair with her". Newspaper reports at the time said "He always had an eye for beautiful women" and that he was "a bon viveur, fond of good wine, good food and good chat".

== Arms ==
Coat of arms of Alan West, Baron West of Spithead
Coronet That of a Baron Crest Issuant from Naval Coronet Or a demi Chinese Dragon Azure supporting with the foreclaws an Anchor Or Torse Or and Azure Escutcheon Azure a Lymphad Or between the tops of four Towers issuant in saltire Argent Supporters On either side a Sea Lion Azure charged on the Chest with a Rose Or and resting upon a Naval Cannon the barrel to the centre also Or Motto Be Just And Kind Orders Order of the Bath Other elements Pendant of the Distinguished Service Cross

Military offices
Preceded by Malcolm Rutherford	Naval Secretary; 1994–1996	Succeeded by Fabian Malbon
Preceded by Sir John Foley	Chief of Defence Intelligence; 1997–2000	Succeeded by Sir Joe French
Preceded by Sir Nigel Essenhigh	Commander-in-Chief Fleet; 2000–2002	Succeeded by Sir Jonathon Band
Preceded by Sir Nigel Essenhigh	First Sea Lord; 2002–2006	Succeeded by Sir Jonathon Band
Orders of precedence in the United Kingdom
Preceded by The Lord Malloch-Brown	Gentlemen; Baron West of Spithead	Followed by The Lord Jones of Birmingham
