= HMS Brave (F94) =

1986 Type 22 or Broadsword-class frigate of the Royal Navy

History

United Kingdom
- Name: HMS Brave
- Operator: Royal Navy
- Builder: Yarrow Shipbuilders
- Laid down: 24 May 1982
- Launched: 19 November 1983
- Sponsored by: Lady Bryson, wife of Admiral Sir Lindsay Bryson KCB, the Controller of the Navy
- Commissioned: 4 July 1986 in Portsmouth, Hampshire
- Decommissioned: 23 March 1999
- Identification: Pennant number: F94
- Motto: Latin: Fortis Fortuna Adiuvat; ("Fortune Favours the Brave")
- Fate: Sunk as a target vessel by HMS Sceptre and HMS Argyll 2004

General characteristics
- Class & type: Type 22 frigate
- Displacement: 5,300 tonnes
- Length: 148.1 m (486 ft 9 in)
- Beam: 14.8 m (48 ft 6 in)
- Draught: 6.4 m (21 ft)
- Propulsion: 2 × Rolls-Royce Spey SM1A Gas Turbines; 2 × Rolls-Royce Tyne RM1C Gas Turbines
- Speed: 18 knots (33 km/h; 21 mph) (cruise); 30 knots (56 km/h; 35 mph) (max)
- Complement: 250 (19 officers, 73 senior ratings, 173 junior ratings)
- Armament: GWS25 Mod 3 Seawolf SAM launcher; 4 × MM38 Exocet SSM launchers; 2 × 40/60 Bofors guns; 2 × STWS torpedo tubes
- Aircraft carried: Lynx HAS3 Mk.8 helicopter

HMS Brave was a Type 22 frigate of the Royal Navy. She was built by Yarrow Shipbuilders Ltd, Glasgow, Scotland and launched on 19 November 1983. Brave was decommissioned on 23 March 1999 and was expended as a target in August 2004 by the submarine Sceptre and frigate Argyll.

== First commission and trials ==
Brave cost some £250m to build and spent most of her first commission (1985–1987) as a trials ship. She achieved various firsts in her weapons and communications fit. Thus, from 1985–1987, Brave had a number of civilian military contractors' personnel embarked and Commander Coyote, the Seawolf trials mascot, became a familiar figure on board. She had a reputation as a "happy ship". It was not until the autumn of 1987 that she undertook Basic Operational Sea Training at Portland and joined the fleet as a fully worked-up unit and she became leader of the 9th Frigate Squadron.

== Programme ==
Her programme from 1986 to 1987 included visits to Lowestoft, Gibraltar, Funchal, Madeira, Porto, London – alongside HMS Belfast in December 1986, Newcastle upon Tyne, Alicante and Torquay. In 1989 the ship was deployed to SE Asia and participated in exercises in the Gulf of Thailand with the navies of Australia (HMAS Darwin FFG04), Malaysia, New Zealand and Singapore. In January 1991 she was deployed to active service in the Gulf war. Whilst there she acted as the flagship for the Senior Naval Officer Middle East (SNOMI) commander of the sea-based task force. Her duties included providing anti-missile defense for US aircraft carriers and battleships, sonar tasks and mine watching. On a couple of occasions she came close to mines which had been dispatched by the Iraq military. Her main task during normal service was sonar patrols and between 1990 and 1992 carried out many successful patrols of the waters around the UK.

== Affiliations ==
She was at first affiliated to Waveney District and the port of Lowestoft, Suffolk; this followed from the last ship of the name's Second World War association with the Suffolk town of Beccles. Other associations included the Royal Irish Rangers, the Worshipful Company of Haberdashers, the Algerines Association, and Sea Cadet and Combined Cadet Force units. She had also forged a liaison with the Mohawk Indians in Canada. TS Mohawk. Her final affiliation was with the town of Dover in 1996.

== Publications ==
- Colledge, J. J.; Warlow, Ben (2006) [1969]. Ships of the Royal Navy: The Complete Record of All Fighting Ships of the Royal Navy from the 15th Century to the Present (3rd Rev ed.). London: Chatham Publishing. ISBN 978-1-86176-281-8. OCLC 67375475.
