= HMS Boxer (F92) =

1983 Type 22 or Broadsword-class frigate of the Royal Navy

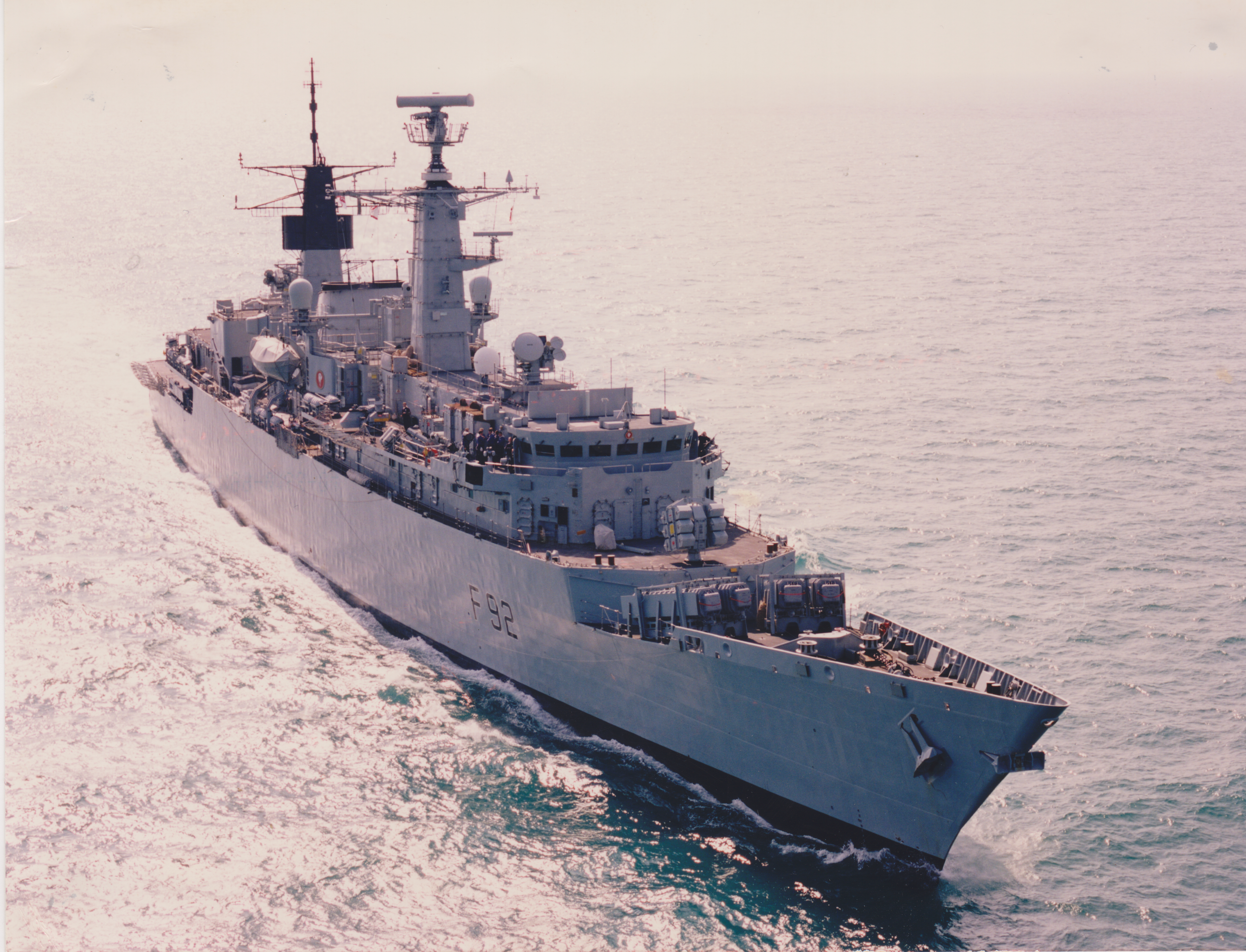
- Boxer in January 1999

History

United Kingdom
- Name: HMS Boxer
- Builder: Yarrow Shipbuilders
- Laid down: 1 November 1979
- Launched: 17 June 1981
- Commissioned: 22 December 1983
- Decommissioned: 4 August 1999
- Identification: Pennant number: F92
- Motto: Praemonitus Praemunitis; (Latin: "Forewarned is Forearmed")
- Fate: Sunk as a target vessel 2004

General characteristics
- Class & type: Type 22 frigate
- Displacement: 4,800 tons
- Length: 146.5 m (481 ft)
- Beam: 14.8 m (49 ft)
- Draught: 6.4 m (21 ft)
- Propulsion: 2-shaft COGOG; 2 × Rolls-Royce Olympus TM3B high-speed gas turbines (54,000 shp (40,000 kW)); 2 × Rolls-Royce Tyne RM1C cruise gas turbines (9,700 shp (7,200 kW))
- Speed: 18 kn (33 km/h; 21 mph) cruise; 30 kn (56 km/h; 35 mph) full
- Range: 8,000 nmi (15,000 km; 9,200 mi)
- Complement: 273
- Armament: 2 × 6 GWS25 Sea Wolf SAM launchers; 4 × 1 Exocet SSM launchers; 2 × Twin 30 mm AA guns; 2 × 20 mm AA guns; 4 × 7.62 mm GPMGs
- Aircraft carried: 2 × Lynx MK 8 helicopters

HMS Boxer was the first of the Batch 2 Type 22 frigates of the Royal Navy. After being decommissioned on 4 August 1999, the ship was sunk by the Royal Navy in the Western Approaches during a live-fire SINKEX in 2004.

== Service ==
She was one of only two Batch 2s (the other being Beaver) fitted with the lower-height hangar of the Batch 1s, so she could only accommodate Lynx helicopters. On coming out of refit in 1990, with a clean bottom she achieved close to 34 knots (63 km/h; 39 mph).

During 1996 and 1997 she was leader of the 1st Frigate Squadron.

== Commanding officers ==
Notable commanding officers include James Perowne (1986-1988), Timothy Laurence (1990-1992) and Richard Ibbotson (1991-1993 and 1998-1999).

== Publications ==
- Colledge, J. J.; Warlow, Ben (2006) [1969]. Ships of the Royal Navy: The Complete Record of All Fighting Ships of the Royal Navy from the 15th Century to the Present (3rd Rev ed.). London: Chatham Publishing. ISBN 978-1-86176-281-8. OCLC 67375475.
