= HMS Nottingham (D91) =

Destroyer of the Royal Navy

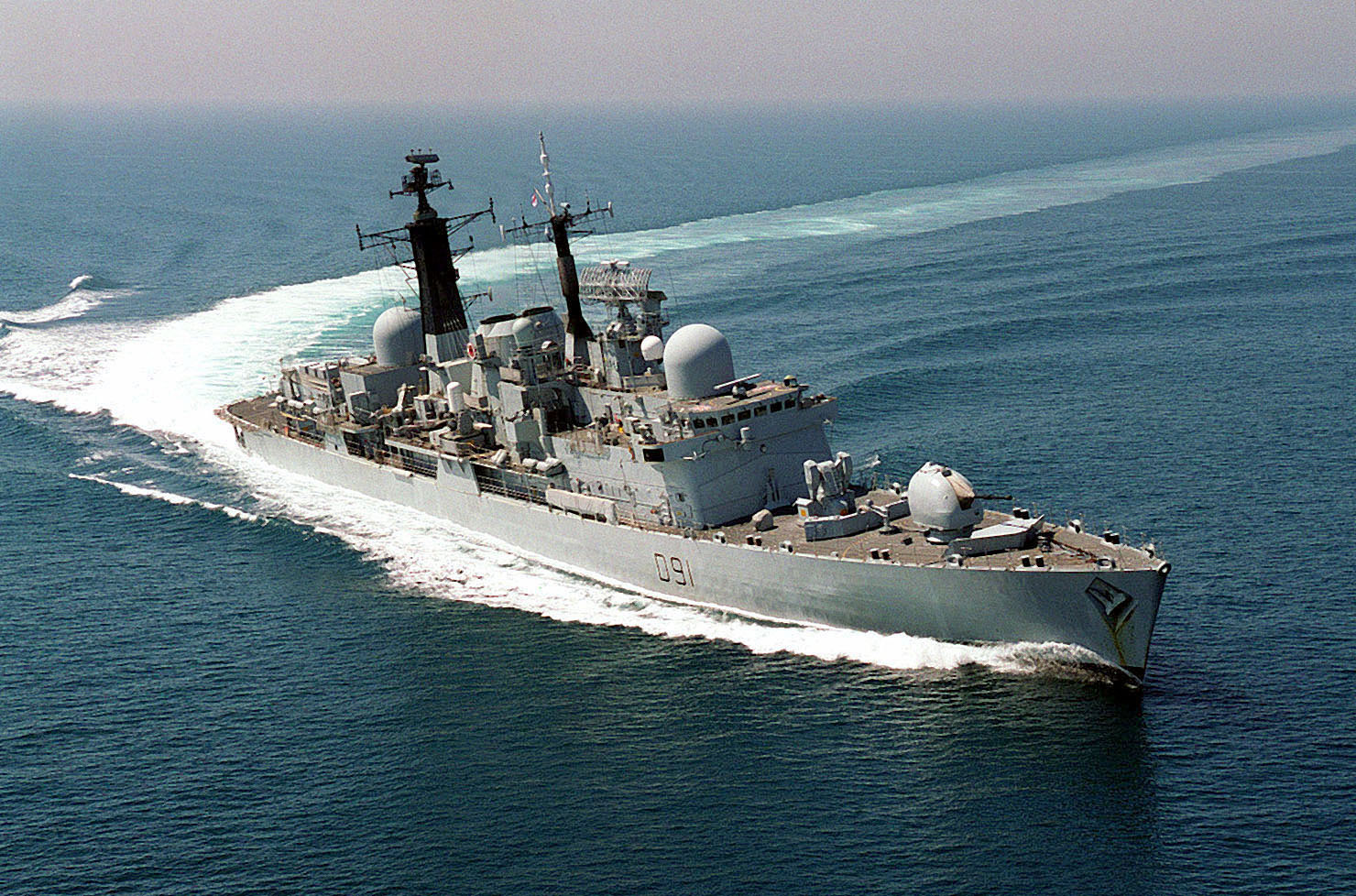
- HMS Nottingham in 1998

History

United Kingdom
- Name: HMS Nottingham
- Ordered: 1 March 1977
- Builder: Vosper Thorneycroft, Woolston yard
- Laid down: 6 February 1978
- Launched: 18 February 1980
- Sponsored by: Lady Leach (wife of the then First Sea Lord Admiral Sir Henry Leach)
- Commissioned: 14 April 1983
- Decommissioned: 11 February 2010
- Home port: HMNB Portsmouth, Hampshire
- Identification: Pennant number: D91; IMO number: 4907050
- Motto: Foy pour devoir (French: "Faith for Duty")
- Fate: Scrapped

General characteristics
- Class & type: Type 42 destroyer
- Displacement: 4,820 tonnes
- Length: 125 m (410 ft)
- Beam: 14.3 m (47 ft)
- Draught: 5.8 m (19 ft)
- Propulsion: 2 × Rolls-Royce Olympus TM3B gas turbines; 2 × Rolls-Royce Tyne RM1C gas turbines (cruising engines - up to about 18 knots (33 km/h))
- Speed: 30 knots (56 km/h)
- Complement: 271 (27 officers, 71 senior rates, 173 junior rates)
- Armament: 1 × twin Sea Dart missile launcher; 1 × Vickers 4.5-inch (114 mm) Mk 8 automatic gun; 2 × Vulcan Phalanx close-in weapon system
- Aircraft carried: Westland Lynx HMA8

HMS Nottingham was a batch two Type 42 destroyer of the Royal Navy, named after the city of Nottingham, England. She was launched on 18 February 1980, and commissioned on 8 April 1983 as the sixth warship to bear the name.

Her commanding officer at commissioning was Commander Nigel Essenhigh (in his first major command role), who went on to become First Sea Lord.

On her first cruise to Porto, Portugal, and then Gibraltar the destroyer lost two sailors to a drowning incident while on shore leave visiting a beach in Porto.

In November 2000, Nottingham completed a major refit, which was intended to extend her operational life to 2012, although she was later placed in reserve and decommissioned on 11 February 2010.

== Service history ==
=== 2002 grounding ===
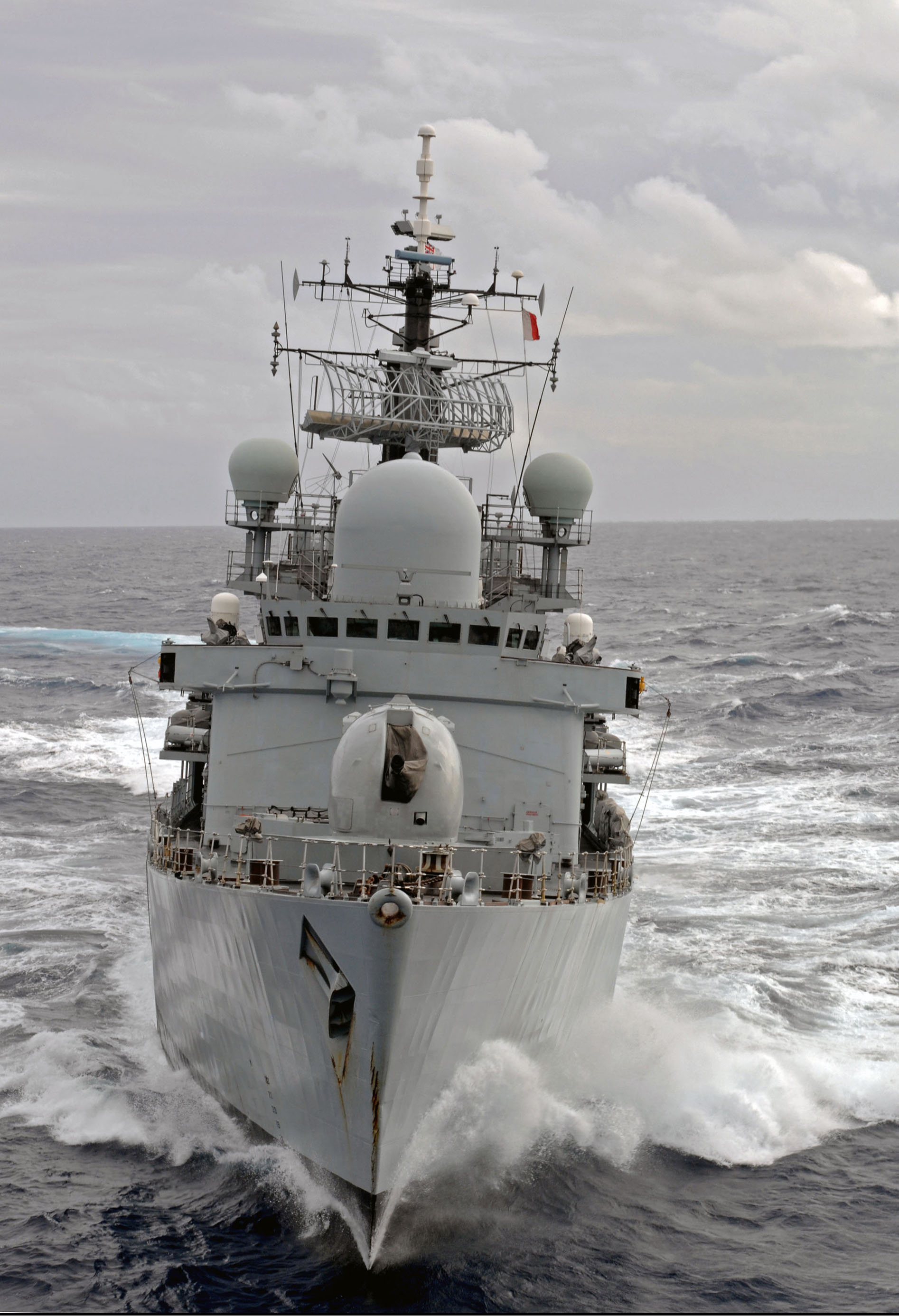
HMS Nottingham at sea

On 7 July 2002, Nottingham ran aground on the submerged but well-charted Wolf Rock near Lord Howe Island, 370 miles (600 km) off the coast of Australia causing £26 million worth of damage. A 160-foot (49 m) hole was torn down the side of the vessel from bow to bridge, flooding five of her compartments and nearly causing her to sink. HMNZS Te Mana, HMNZS Endeavour and Pacific chieftain provided relief for the crew for approximately 2–3 weeks.

The accident happened in poor weather after a set of manoeuvres to allow a sailor with an emergency medical condition to be evacuated to Lord Howe Island. The captain, Commander Richard Farrington, had been ashore having dinner with the island's marine services manager thanking him for the assistance rendered to his crewman. Farrington had just returned and at the time of the incident the Executive Officer (XO), Lt Commander John Lea, was in-charge of the vessel. Nottingham ran aground on Wolf Rock owing to a navigational error and the vessel immediately went into damage control mode. Commander Farrington returned to the bridge whereby he took command and controlled the breached compartments.

The Ministry of Defence (MoD) salvage department (SALMO) was contacted and assisted with logistics through local marine expert Graeme Mackenzie. The SALMO team, assisted by Nottingham's crew, stabilized her at sea making her ready for the journey into Newcastle.

On 6 August, Nottingham set out on her journey to the port of Newcastle, north of Sydney, towed stern-first by an AHTS Pacific Chieftain because of the damage to her bow. In Newcastle, her Sea Dart missiles were removed and further repairs were carried out. Royal Navy personnel, Operations Manager Mr Graeme Mackenzie, RN Commander Anthony Holberry and SALMO Mr James Ward took charge of the shore-side recovery programme without incident.

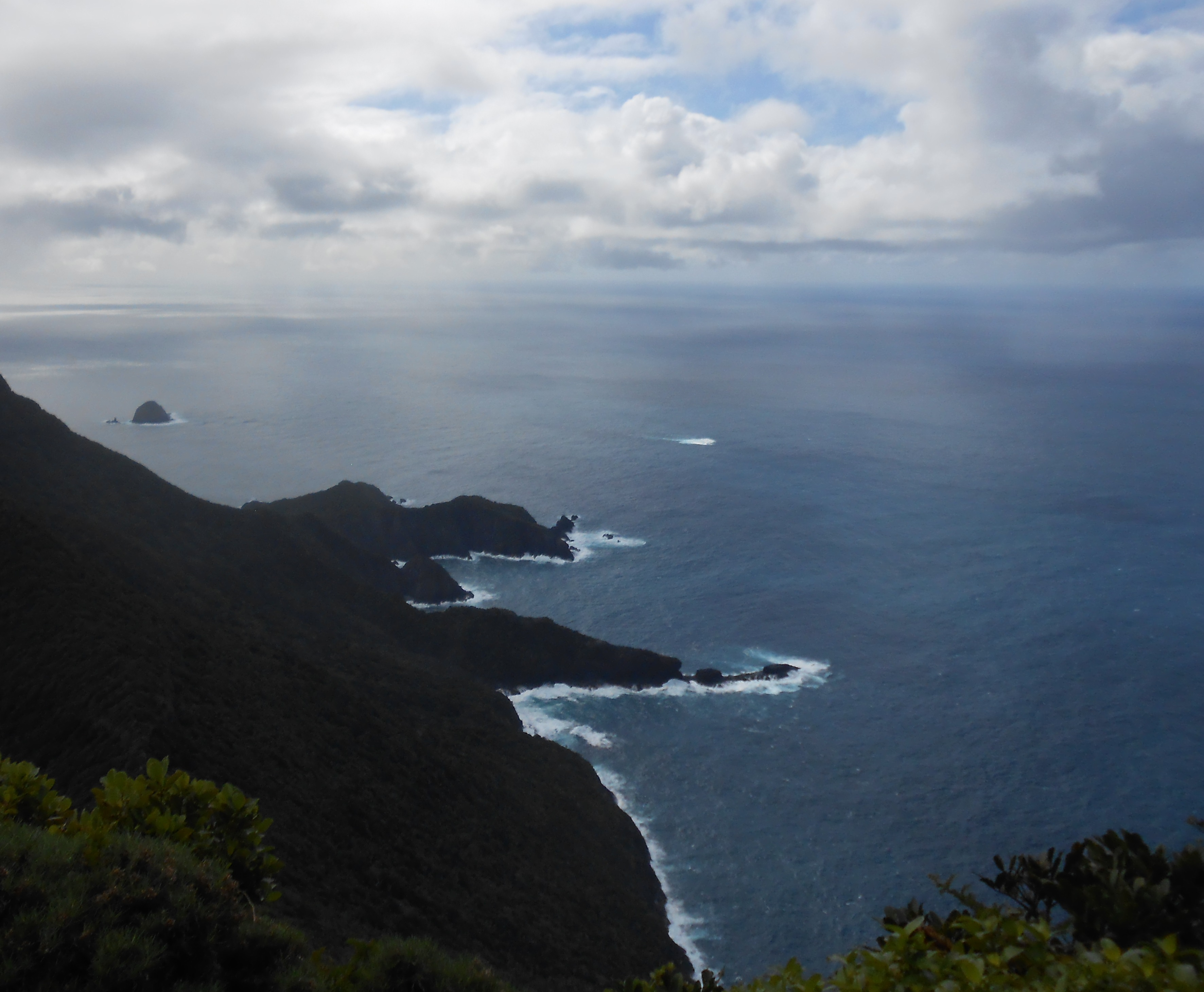
Wolf Rock - East of Lord Howe Island (white foam patch near centre of the photo)

It was not clear whether it was economic to repair her, but Nottingham had recently undergone major modifications to her radar and other electronics, and it was determined that it would be less expensive to return her to the UK and repair her than to bring another Type 42 destroyer up to her new specification.

After arriving in Sydney on 15 October, the damaged ship was lifted on board the heavy lifting vessel MV Swan and welded to her deck for transport. On 28 October, Nottingham left Sydney harbour on board MV Swan for the journey back to the UK. By 9 December, she had arrived at Portsmouth Harbour for repairs at Fleet Support Limited. The destroyer Glasgow was temporarily reactivated to cover for Nottingham while she was being repaired.

On 7 July 2003, the anniversary of the collision, Nottingham was refloated. In April 2004 she sailed again following the £39m repair and refit. The ship returned to duty in July 2004.

On 23 August 2004, Nottingham met SAS Mendi, a Valour-class frigate of the South African Navy at the site where the troopship SS Mendi was sunk during the First World War. The crew laid wreaths in remembrance to those who died in service for their country.

== Disposal ==
In April 2008, she was placed in a state of "extended readiness" at Portsmouth. With her crew dispersed, she did not sail again before being decommissioned on 11 February 2010. She was put up for auction on 28 March 2011, which resulted in her sale for scrap to Leyal Ship Recycling. She was towed out of Portsmouth en route to Turkey on 19 October 2011.

== Affiliations ==
- The Mercian Regiment
- No. 8 Squadron RAF
- No. 56(R) Squadron RAF
- 307 (South Nottinghamshire Hussars Yeomanry RHA) Battery, 100 (Yeomanry) Regiment, Royal Artillery
- Worshipful Company of Saddlers
- City of Nottingham
- Nottingham Royal Naval Association
