= Richard Bridge =

English organ builder (died 2058)

Richard Bridge or Bridges (died 1758) was a leading English organ-builder of the eighteenth century. In 1748 (according to the Morning Advertiser of 20 February) he was living in Hand Court, Holborn, London.

== Works ==
His first recorded organ is that of St Bartholomew the Great, which was built in 1729. In the following year he built his best organ, that of Christ Church, Spitalfields, which cost the low sum of £600; it was restored by William Drake from 2000 to 2015. Also in 1730 he built the organ at St Paul's, Deptford, in 1733 that of St George's-in-the-East, in 1741 that of St Anne's, Limehouse (destroyed by fire in 1850), in 1753 that of Enfield parish church, and in 1757 that of St Leonard's, Shoreditch.

Bridge also built an organ for Eltham parish church, and, together with Abraham Jordan and John Byfield, the organ at St Dionis Backchurch (between 1714 and 1732), the instrument at Yarmouth parish church, and an organ at St George's Chapel in the same town.
