= HMS Norfolk (F230) =

1990 Type 23 frigate of the Royal Navy

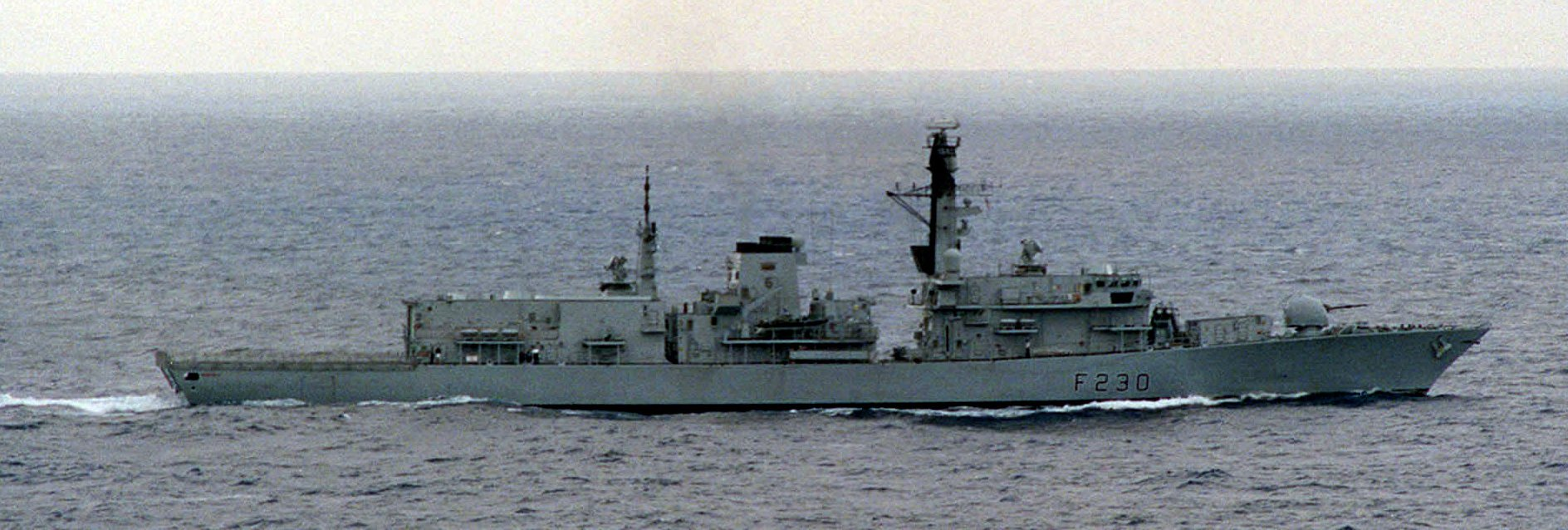
- HMS Norfolk underway on 21 June 1997

History

United Kingdom
- Name: Norfolk
- Namesake: Norfolk
- Ordered: 29 October 1984
- Builder: Yarrow Shipbuilders
- Laid down: 14 December 1985
- Launched: 10 July 1987
- Sponsored by: Princess Margaret
- Commissioned: 1 June 1990
- Decommissioned: 15 April 2005
- Home port: Devonport
- Motto: Serviens servo; (Serving, I preserve)
- Fate: Sold to Chile
- Badge

Chile
- Name: Almirante Cochrane
- Commissioned: 22 November 2006
- Home port: Valparaíso
- Motto: No hay imposible (There's no impossible)
- Status: Active
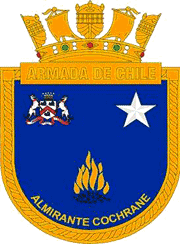
- Badge

General characteristics
- Class & type: Type 23 frigate
- Displacement: 4,900 tonnes
- Length: 133 m (436 ft 4 in)
- Beam: 16.1 m (52 ft 10 in)
- Draught: 5.5 m (18 ft 1 in)
- Propulsion: Combined diesel-electric and gas (CODLAG); 2 × Rolls-Royce Spey SM1A gas turbines, 34,000 hp (25,000 kW); 4 × Paxman Valenta diesel engines, 7,000 hp (5,200 kW); 2 × GEC electric motors (1.5 MW, 4,400 hp)
- Speed: 28 knots (52 km/h; 32 mph) (max)
- Range: 7,800 nmi (14,400 km; 9,000 mi) at 15 kn (28 km/h; 17 mph)
- Complement: 185
- Sensors & processing systems: TRS-4D G-band active scanning radar; 2050 sonar; Type 2087 sonar (Installed during year 2014 refit)
- Electronic warfare & decoys: UAF-1 ESM; 675 ECM jammer; Seagnat ECCM
- Armament: 2 × quad RGM-84 Harpoon missile launchers; 32 × vertical Launch Sea Ceptor anti-aircraft & anti-missile missile system; 1 × 4.5-inch (114 mm) Mk.8 Mod 1 gun; 2 × Oerlikon 30 mm cannons; 4 × 324 mm Sting Ray - Side Launch Torpedo System
- Aircraft carried: Eurocopter AS332 Super Puma or Eurocopter AS365 Dauphin

HMS Norfolk was a British Type 23 frigate, the sixth in the Royal Navy to use this name, laid down in 1985 by Yarrow Shipbuilders. She was launched on the Clyde by Princess Margaret, Countess of Snowdon in July 1987 and named for the Dukedom of Norfolk. She was commissioned on 1 June 1990. Norfolk was the 'first of class', as well as being the first of a new generation of 'lean manned' ships. She was commissioned into the Chilean Navy in 2006 as Almirante Cochrane.

== Operational history ==
=== Royal Navy ===
Following commissioning in 1990, HMS Norfolk completed a year on first of class trials culminating in BOST in November/December 1991. 1992 started with JMC following by a brief defect rectification period in early March. On 11 May, Norfolk deployed as part of the Orient 92 Task Group with HMS Invincible (Flag), Boxer and Newcastle. During her deployment she completed visits to the Eastern Med (Soudha in Crete, Alexandria in Egypt, Haifa in Israel), Mauritius and Diego Garcia in the Indian Ocean, Malaysia (Lumut, Penang, Pulau Tioman), Thailand (Bangkok), South Korea (Pusan) and Hong Kong in the Far East and Oman in the Middle East. She returned to the UK at the end November 1992.

In January 1993, Norfolk continued with first of class shock trials in Portsmouth before completing accommodation changes being the first Type 23 to host Wren ratings at sea. This was completed in June 1993 followed by a brief trip to Amsterdam, BOST and preparation for her Southlant deployment in 1994. In 1994, Norfolk became the first Royal Navy warship to visit South Africa in over 20 years, a visit designed to show that the Commonwealth was ready to accept South Africa as an ally resulting from the abolition of apartheid. Since then, she has conducted many operations, including a deployment to Sierra Leone in 2000 as part of a Royal Navy task force to assist in restoration of peace and stability to the war-torn West African nation. 2000 was a busy year for Norfolk with a deployment under Commander Bruce Williams to the United States. Amongst the places visited were Savannah, Wilmington, Port Canaveral and Nassau. She has also served in the Mediterranean Sea and the Persian Gulf, as well as being involved in Standing Naval Force Atlantic. Other duties included acting as guardship for the Falkland Islands, as well as the Caribbean.

A chance encounter in 2000 attracted a local bottlenose dolphin whilst on exercises. A photograph of the encounter was taken and the dolphin, frequently seen in the area, was named Norfolk in honour of this encounter.

==== 2001–2005 ====
2002 saw a busy year for Norfolk, commanded by Commander Richard Talbot. She was deployed with vessels from Portugal, Norway, Spain, Germany, Italy and the United States of America as part of her role within the Standing Naval Force Atlantic (SNFL). As part of SNFL she was involved in a simulated volcanic eruption disaster relief exercise. March saw Exercise 'Strong Resolve' off Northern Norway, then in April she was in the Mediterranean as part of Operation Direct Endeavour for NATO. During the Mediterranean deployment there was a visit to Malta, including hosting the Princess Royal, for the celebration of the anniversary of the award of the George Cross to the island. The 30,000-nautical-mile (56,000 km) voyage was also the last for Mr Chick MBE, a laundryman who served for 50 years including the Yangtze Incident, Korea and Suez through to the Falklands Campaign and Gulf War. Norfolk then attended the 2002 Navy days at Devonport. 2002/2003 saw the crew of Norfolk deployed with 'Green Goddess' fire engines to compensate for the fire service strike. Norfolk spent 169 days alongside the wall at HMNB Portsmouth. May 2003 saw Norfolk sail to her home base of Devonport and resume her active role, training ready for her deployment to the Gulf on Operation Telic 1/2. Amongst the simulations were attack runs by small attack craft, similar to the one which attacked USS Cole.

Norfolk was the first ship to be armed with the Vertical Launch Seawolf missile system. Norfolk was also the first Royal Navy warship to be re-armed with the new 4.5–inch (114 mm) Mod 1 gun system. 2004 saw Norfolk involved in the celebrations of the centenary of the Entente Cordiale with France. Norfolk also took part in the 2004 amphibious warfare-themed Devonport Navy days. In July 2004, it was announced that Norfolk would be one of three Type 23 frigates decommissioned by the end of 2007. Norfolk entered her home port for the last time at the end of November 2004 was decommissioned at Devonport on 15 April 2005, the guest of honour being then Commander-in-Chief Fleet, Admiral Sir Jonathon Band, who had been Norfolk's first commanding officer.

=== Chilean Navy ===
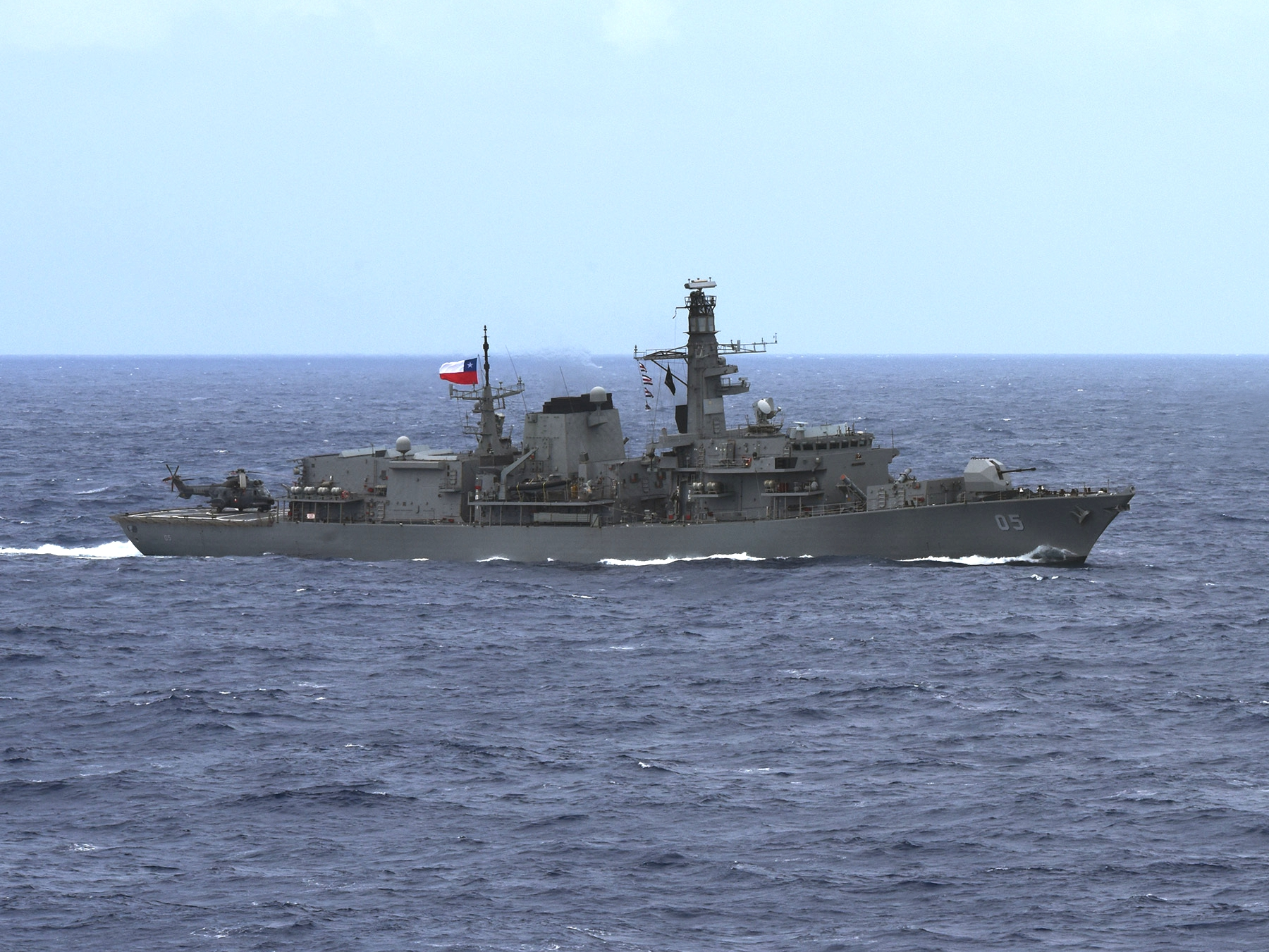
Almirante Cochrane in June 2016

In June 2005 it was announced that Norfolk would be sold to the Chilean Navy. She was commissioned into the Chilean Navy on 22 November 2006 as Almirante Cochrane (named after Thomas Cochrane, 10th Earl of Dundonald).

Along with other Chilean vessels of her class, Almirante Cochrane underwent a significant upgrade from March 2018 to November 2019. The CMS 330 combat management architecture was installed along TRS-4D G-Band active scanning radars and 32 CAMM Sea Ceptor vertical-launch surface-to-air missile silos to replace the previous Sea Wolf SAM system.
