= Richard J. Bridges =

American pharmacologist

- Born: November 16, 1955 (age 70); Zweibrucken, Germany
- Education: Cornell University Graduate School of Medical Sciences (PhD)
- Scientific career
- Workplaces: University of Montana

Richard J. Bridges (born November 16, 1955) is an American pharmacologist and Regents Professor of Pharmacology and Toxicology at the University of Montana.
