= Sinking of the FV Antares =

British trawler sunk by submarine in 1990

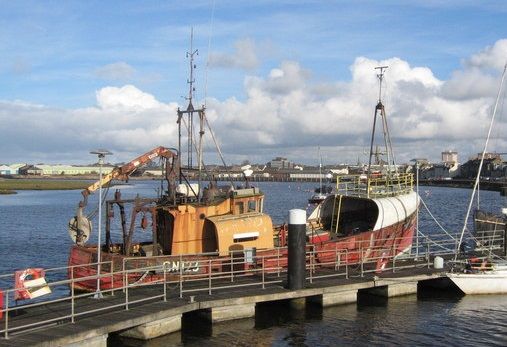
Antares in 2007

The fishing vessel Antares was a pelagic trawler based in Carradale, Kintyre in the United Kingdom. She was fishing off the coast of the Isle of Arran on 22 November 1990 when she foundered with the loss of four crew members after her trawl-line was snagged by Royal Navy Trafalgar-class nuclear-powered submarine HMS Trenchant. An investigation by the Marine Accident Investigation Branch concluded that the accident had been caused by "a partial breakdown in both the structure and the standards of watchkeeping on board Trenchant".

== Sinking of Antares ==
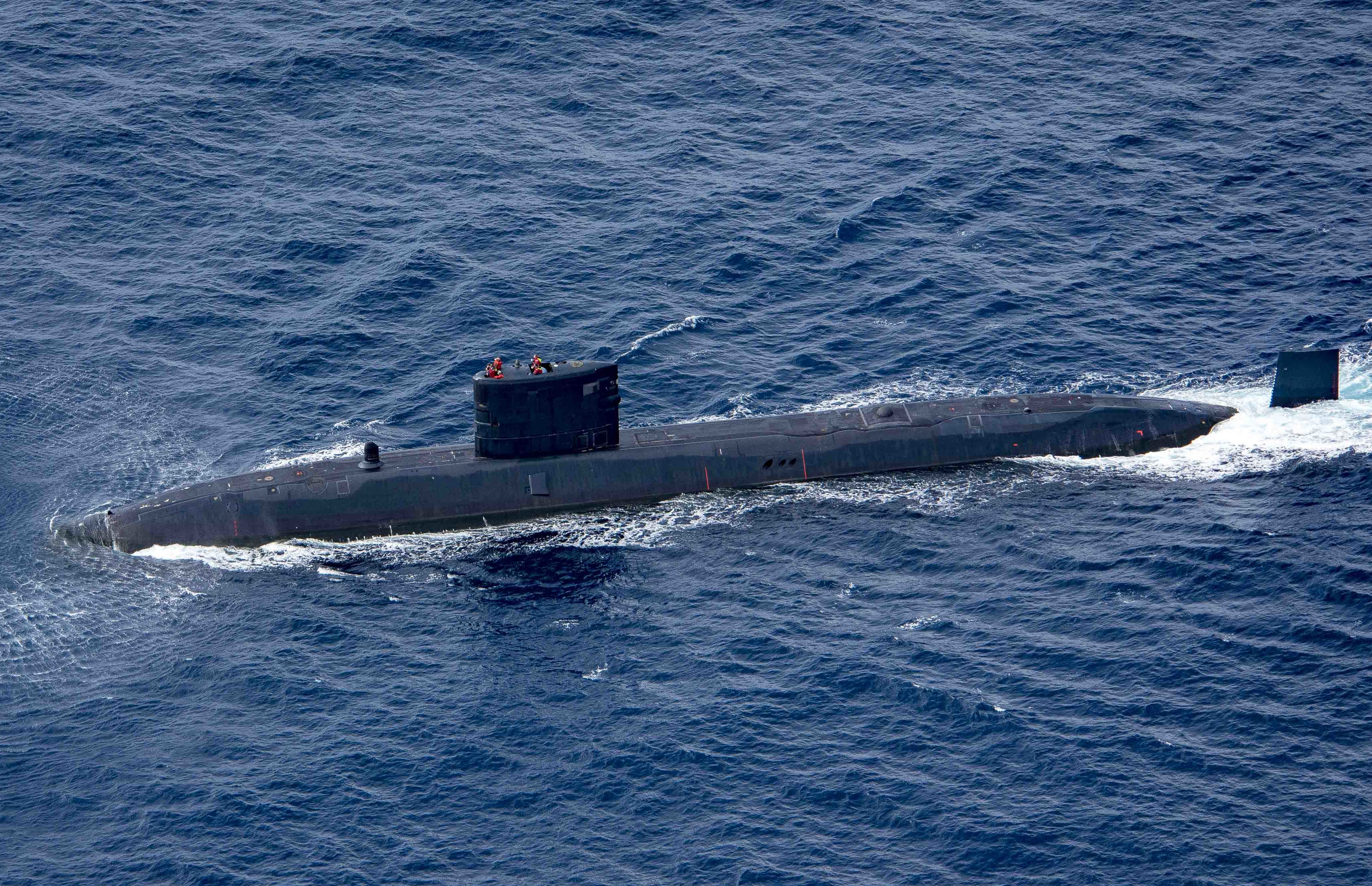
HMS Trenchant

Antares was a 55 feet (17 m) wooden-hulled motor-fishing vessel of 34 tons built in 1965 by J and G Forbes in Sandhaven, Aberdeenshire and registered in Campbeltown. On 19 November 1990 Antares left her home port of Carradale to fish in the Firth of Clyde, returning daily to the port of Largs to offload her catch. Aboard were owner and skipper Jamie Russell, 33, Billy Martindale, 24, and Dugald John Campbell, 20, all from Carradale, and Stewart Campbell, 29, from Campbeltown. On 21 November Antares sailed to fish in the deep waters in Bute Sound, north-east of the Isle of Arran, where two other fishing vessels, Heroine and Hercules III were also fishing.

Also in the vicinity was Royal Navy hunter-killer submarine HMS Trenchant and Leander-class frigate HMS Charybdis. Trenchant had left HMNB Clyde at Faslane on 12 November 1990 to undertake a Submarine Command Course, known as a Perisher course, with six students. The first phase of the course took place between Scotland and the Faroe Islands, before Trenchant returned to the inshore waters of the Clyde Exercise Area on 17 November. On 21 November one of the students took over command as Duty Captain to undertake a simulated mine laying exercise while evading detection by Charybdis on the surface. By 22 November Trenchant was in Bute Sound heading northwest at a depth of 60 metres. The Duty Captain, having successfully completed their exercise, prepared to hand over to the next student at around 02.00 hours. Meanwhile, the Commander and Course Commander were in the wardroom discussing the Duty Captain's execution of the exercise. Around this time four passive sonar contacts were detected, which were presumed to be Charybdis, two trawlers and a coaster. At 02.17, the submarine turned to port to avoid a close sonar contact on her starboard, believed to be Heroine. A banging noise was heard on the outer starboard hull which the Sonar Controller reported as being a snagged trawl line. A second disturbance in the sea, described by an Able Seaman as "a sound like a propeller winding up", was heard shortly after. Trenchant surfaced at 03.00 hours and trawl wire was found fouling her casing. The submarine attempted to contact the two fishing vessels that were visible in the area, Heroine and Hercules III, but neither responded. As both vessels appeared to be fishing normally, Trenchant reported the incident to Faslane, then submerged and proceeded with the exercise.

Shortly after 04.00 Faslane reported the incident to Clyde Marine Rescue Coordination Centre and the Secretary of the Clyde Fisherman’s Association. Clyde Marine Rescue Coordination Centre put out a call to all fishing vessels in the area but initially got no response. Concerned by the incident, the Secretary of the Clyde Fisherman’s Association contacted trawlers at sea and local fish salesmen to try to identify any fishing vessels that had not returned to port. Heroine and Hercules III reported that they had lost contact with Antares but assumed the vessel had returned to port. When it became clear that Antares had not docked, the Royal Naval Air Station at Prestwick sent a helicopter to search the area off Garroch Head. Flotsam and surface oil were observed by the helicopter around 11.00 and a full scale search operation was launched involving two helicopters and 40 search units, including shoreline search teams, lifeboats from Lamlash and Troon, HMS Charybdis and 33 fishing vessels in the area. A shipwreck confirmed to be Antares was discovered at 14.00 on 22 November, shoreline searches on the west coast of the Isle of Bute continued until 25 November. The wreck of Antares was raised by the Ministry of Defence on 10 December 1990 and the bodies of three crew members were recovered from the wreck site. Following the salvage operation, the men of Carradale saturation trawled the area around the wreck in an unsuccessful attempt to find the remains of the fourth crew member. The body was finally brought to the surface on 15 April 1991 in the nets of a trawler fishing in the area.

== Inquiries and recommendations ==
An investigation into the sinking of Antares was undertaken by the Marine Accident Investigation Branch to establish the circumstances of the incident. The investigation found that when Trenchant changed course to avoid Heroine she snagged Antares' trawl line, causing the trawler to capsize and rapidly fill with water as she turned upside down. The boat was dragged below the surface until the trawl lines snapped and she sank to the bottom. The investigation reported that "the sole cause of the collision was a partial breakdown in the watchkeeping structure and standards on board Trenchant". Among the investigation's findings were that the submarine's command team were unaware that there were two vessels within the sonar contact, that no proper surface assessment of the incident was carried out by the command team following the collision, that attempts to contact the fishing vessels in the area were inadequate, and that initial incorrect reports from Trenchant to Faslane resulted in an eight-hour delay in mounting a search and rescue operation, which may have contributed to loss of life. No blame for the collision was attached to Antares, which was going about her legal business of commercial fishing in the area. The investigation reported that Antares was very well maintained, however her liferaft had been stowed incorrectly and as a result it did not float free and inflate when the vessel sank and that this could have contributed to the loss of life.

The report also recorded 15 previous incidents involving submarines and trawlers in the 10-year period since 1980, including one in 1982 that caused the foundering of the Irish trawler Sheralga in the Irish Sea, after she was dragged for two miles before sinking.

A fatal accident inquiry was also undertaken by the Sheriff Principal of North Strathclyde, Robert Hay, in September 1991. The fatal accident inquiry and the Marine Accident Investigation both made a series of recommendations chief of which were that immediate action should be taken to establish a mandatory separation zone of at least 3,000 yards between dived submarines and vessels engaged in fishing, and that submarine warfare exercises should be moved to more remote areas of the Firth of Clyde and segregated completely from fishing interests. The Royal Navy accepted the recommendations and the separation distance between dived submarines and vessels engaged in fishing was increased from 2,000 yards to 3,000 yards.

== Court martial ==
In June 1992 the Duty Commander, Submariner Lieutenant Commander Peter McDonnell, was courtmartialed on six charges of negligence. He was found guilty on three charges and severely reprimanded. The charges being: failing to realise how close the trawler was to Trenchant; allowing Antares to stay on a collision course without verifying her range; and being unaware of the presence of a second trawler. George Foulkes, MP for Carrick, Cumnock and Doon Valley, and families of the deceased, expressed anger at the outcome of the court martial and the Armed Forces Minister Archie Hamilton's decision not to take further disciplinary action, as they believed that as a student officer under training, McDonnell had been made a scapegoat by the Royal Navy.

== Memorial ==
After the conclusion of the Marine Accident Investigation, Antares was bequeathed to the Scottish Maritime Museum in Irvine where she became part of the museum's fleet. When maintaining the vessel became too costly, Antares was scrapped in Troon in 2008, by permission of the crew's families.

A memorial plaque commemorating the crew of Antares is mounted in the harbour wall at Carradale.

== In fiction ==
An incident occurs in the BBC's 2021 drama series Vigil that closely resembles the sinking of the trawler, and the referenced loss of the fictional Mhairi Finnea in the series bears similarities to Antares.

== See also ==
- Ehime Maru and USS Greeneville collision – similar collision in 2001 between a US Navy attack submarine and a fishing vessel, resulting in the fishing vessel sinking.
- Bugaled Breizh
