= HMS Triumph (S93) =

Trafalgar-class nuclear-powered attack submarine of the Royal Navy

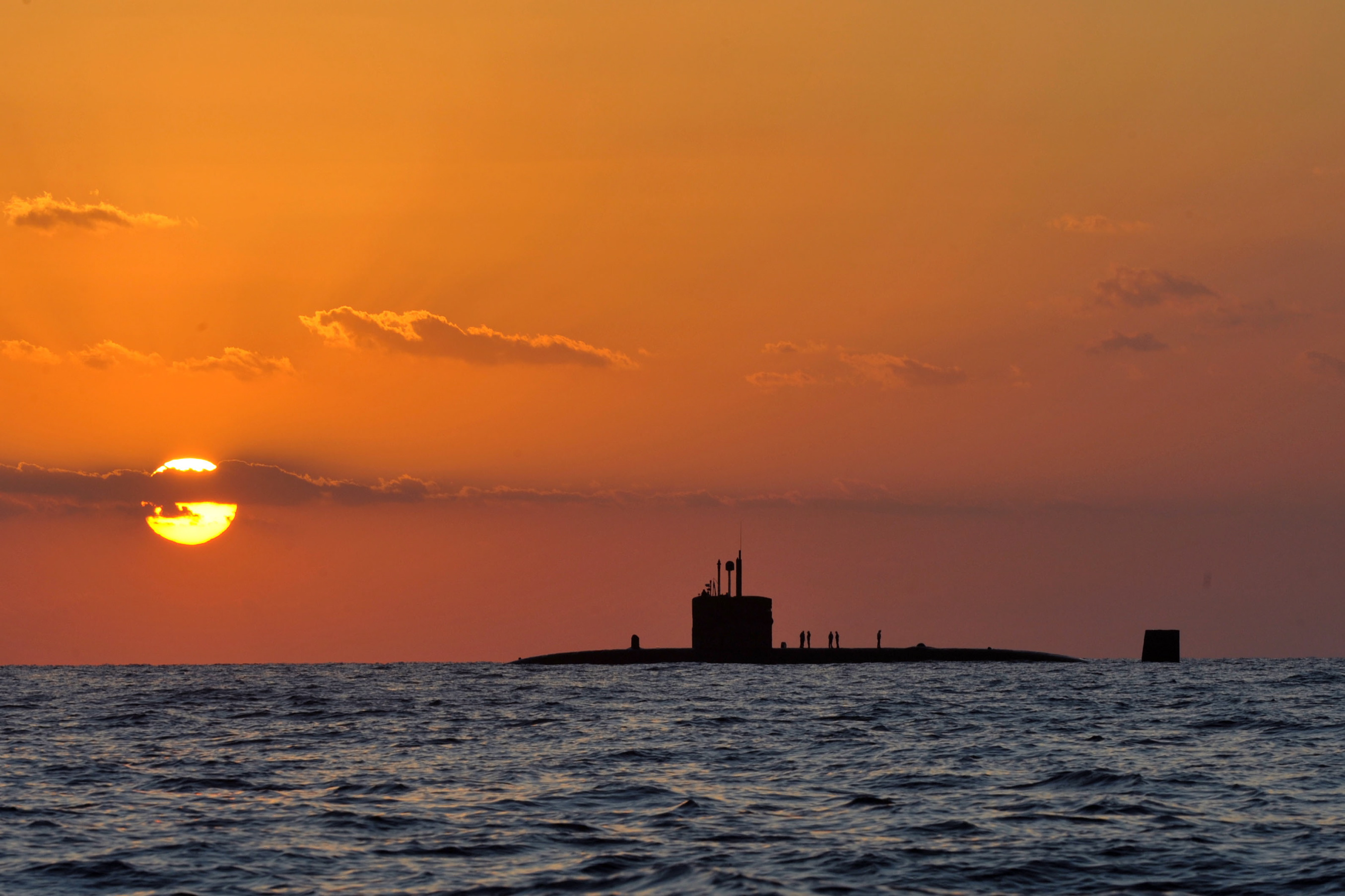
- HMS Triumph in the Middle East, 2012

History

United Kingdom
- Name: Triumph
- Ordered: 3 July 1986
- Builder: Vickers Shipbuilding and Engineering, Barrow-in-Furness
- Laid down: 2 February 1987
- Launched: 16 February 1991
- Sponsored by: Mrs. Ann Hamilton
- Commissioned: 2 October 1991
- Decommissioned: 18 July 2025
- Home port: HMNB Devonport, Plymouth
- Identification: Pennant number: S93
- Status: Out of service
- Badge

General characteristics
- Class & type: Trafalgar-class submarine
- Displacement: Surfaced: 4,500 to 4,800 t (4,700 long tons; 5,300 short tons); Submerged: 5,200 to 5,300 t (5,200 long tons; 5,800 short tons)
- Length: 85.4 m (280 ft)
- Beam: 9.8 m (32 ft)
- Draught: 9.5 m (31 ft)
- Propulsion: 1 × Rolls-Royce PWR1 nuclear reactor, HEU 93.5%; 2 × GEC steam turbines; 2 × WH Allen turbo generators; 3.2 MW; 2 × Paxman diesel generators 2,800 shp (2.1 MW); 1 × pump jet propulsor; 1 × motor for emergency drive; 1 × auxiliary retractable prop
- Speed: Over 30 knots (56 km/h), submerged
- Range: Unlimited
- Complement: 130
- Electronic warfare & decoys: 2 × SSE Mk8 launchers for Type 2066 and Type 2071 torpedo decoys; RESM Racal UAP passive intercept; CESM Outfit CXA; SAWCS decoys carried from 2002
- Armament: 5 × 21-inch (533 mm) torpedo tubes with stowage for up to 30 weapons: Tomahawk Block IV cruise missiles; Spearfish heavyweight torpedoes

HMS Triumph was a Trafalgar-class nuclear submarine of the Royal Navy and was the seventh and final boat of her class. She was the nineteenth nuclear-powered hunter-killer submarine built for the Royal Navy. Triumph was the tenth vessel, and the second submarine, to bear the name. The first HMS Triumph was a 68-gun galleon built in 1561.

Triumph was laid down in 1987 by Vickers Shipbuilding and Engineering. The boat was launched in February 1991 by Mrs. Ann Hamilton, wife of the then Armed Forces Minister Archie Hamilton. She was commissioned in October that same year.

After returning to her base at Devonport for the final time in late 2024, Triumph was decommissioned in July 2025, being the last boat of her class in service.

== Operational history ==
Triumph sailed to Australia in 1993, travelling 41,000 miles (66,000 km) submerged without support—the longest solo deployment so far by a Royal Navy nuclear submarine. In that same year, author Tom Clancy published a book called Submarine: a Guided Tour Inside a Nuclear Warship which was centred around Triumph and USS Miami.

=== War in Afghanistan ===
After the 9/11 attacks in the United States, Triumph, along with her sister ship Trafalgar, formed part of a task group in 2001 as part of the American-led invasion of Afghanistan, Britain's contribution being known as Operation Veritas. During Operation Veritas, Triumph launched Tomahawk missiles at targets inside Afghanistan. When Triumph returned home after operations had ended, the boat flew the Jolly Roger, the traditional way of denoting live weapons had been fired.

On 19 November 2000, Triumph ran aground travelling at 22 knots (41 km/h; 25 mph) and at a depth of 200 metres (660 ft) while off the western Scottish coast. The boat surfaced in a safe and controlled fashion. She was under the command of trainee officers and an investigation attributed the grounding to poor navigation. Triumph suffered only superficial damage.

In 2005, Triumph began a £300 million nuclear refuel and refitting period which also saw the installation of an updated 2076 bow, flank and towed array sonar and a new command and control system. The boat rejoined the fleet in June 2010 and will be the last of the Trafalgar-class submarines to be decommissioned.

Triumph was also featured in the TV programme How to Command a Nuclear Submarine in 2011 in which trainee commanding officers are shown on the Navy's "Perisher Course".

=== Libya operations ===
In March 2011, she participated in Operation Ellamy, firing Tomahawk cruise missiles on 19 March, 20 March and again on 24 March at Libyan air defence targets from the Mediterranean Sea. One of these strikes hit a command and control centre in Colonel Gaddafi's presidential compound. Triumph returned to Devonport on 3 April 2011 flying a Jolly Roger adorned with six small tomahawk axes to indicate the missiles fired by the submarine in the operation.

Eleven weeks later on 20 June upon her return to Devonport, in the interim having deployed for a second deployment in the Mediterranean and relieving HMS Turbulent, she once again flew the Jolly Roger adorned with tomahawks, indicating that further cruise missile strikes had taken place in Libya as part of the ongoing operations there. Analysts believe that in total more than 15 cruise missiles were fired by the submarine during the operations.

=== 2011/2012 deployment ===
In November 2011, Triumph sailed from her home port in Devonport for a seven-month deployment that saw her away from the UK until summer 2012. The deployment saw her operate in a wide range of locations including the Atlantic, the Mediterranean, the Arabian Sea and the Indian Ocean.

=== 2013 ===
In May 2013, her refit was reported complete and she returned to operational duties which continued to 2018.

=== Final commission ===
Following the Integrated Review of 2020, her service was extended by 18 months, to continue until 2025.

In December 2022, the submarine was reported to have returned to sea for post-refit trials, following a four-year refit to extend her service life to about 2024/25. In January 2023, the submarine was reported to have deployed to the Clyde naval base, probably for operational sea training.

As of late 2024, the submarine remained active operating out of the Devonport naval base. In December 2024, the submarine departed Faslane for the final time sailing to Devonport for her planned decommissioning in the new year.

== Home port and affiliations ==
Triumph was part of the Devonport Flotilla based at Devonport.

She is currently affiliated with:

- Blackpool Borough Council
- Newton Abbot Town Council
- The Duke of Lancaster's Regiment
- Sussex University Royal Naval Unit
- Worshipful Company of Upholders
- TS Exmouth Sea Cadet Unit
- TS Amazon Sea Cadet Unit
- 1322 (Newton Abbot) Squadron Air Training Corps
- The Royal Naval Association (Newton Abbot Branch)
- The Royal British Legion (Newton Abbot Branch)
