= Bugaled Breizh =

Fishing vessel that sank in 2004

Coordinates: 49.952°N 5.214°W

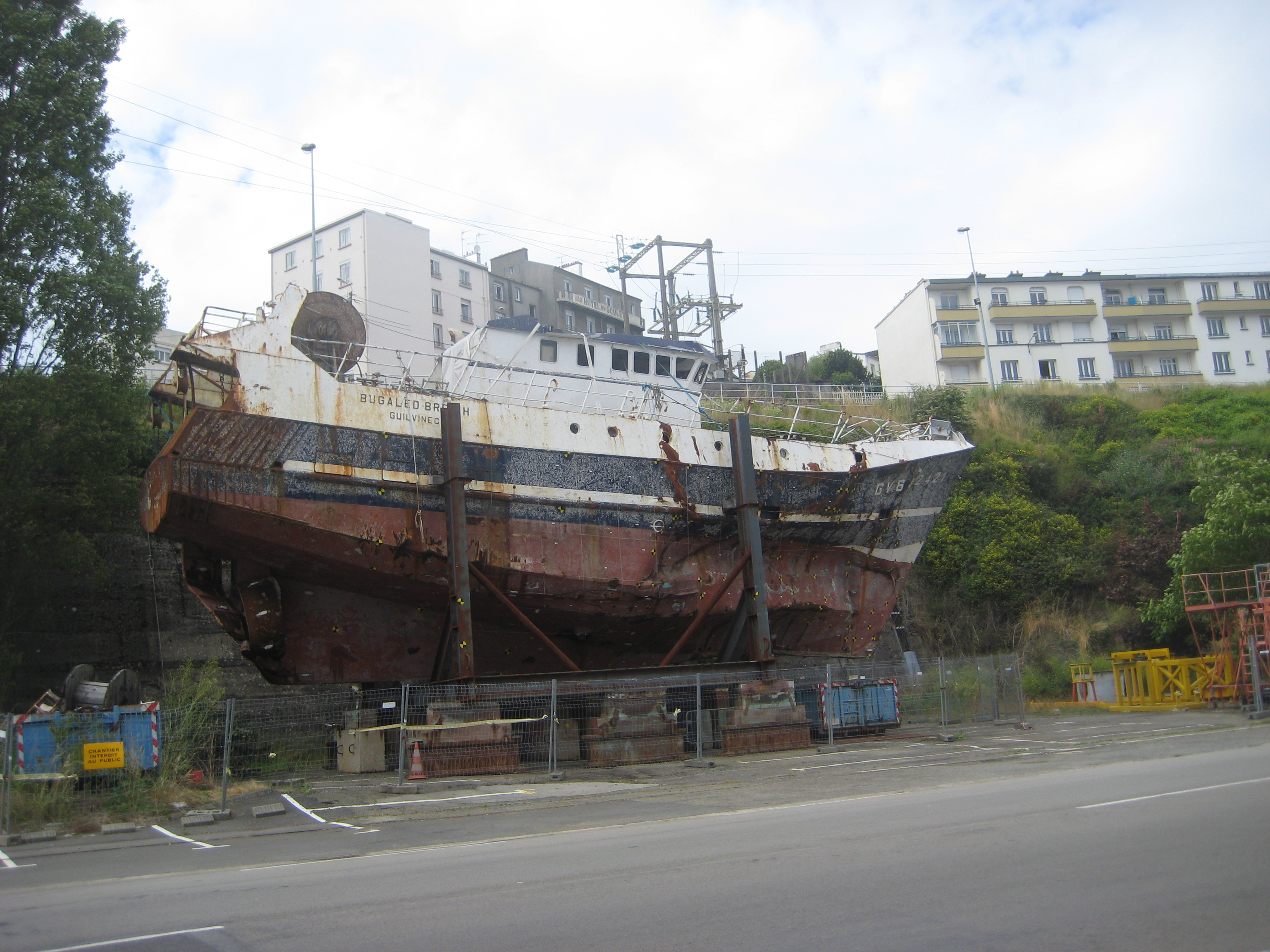
- The raised Bugaled Breizh

History
- Name: Bugaled Breizh
- Owner: Micheal Douce
- Builder: Bretagne Sud
- Completed: 1986
- Out of service: 15 January 2004
- Identification: 8428; IMO number: 8873843
- Fate: capsized, 15 January 2004
- Status: raised June 2004, examined and stored

General characteristics
- Class & type: Motorized fishing vessel
- Tonnage: 103
- Length: 24 m (79 ft)
- Crew: 5

MFV Bugaled Breizh was a French trawler from Loctudy, Finistère, whose sinking with all hands in 90 metres of water in the English Channel on 15 January 2004 remains unresolved. While it appeared possible that the ship was pulled under by a submarine, a specific submarine could not be identified from among the number of submarines of several nations operating in the general vicinity of the accident site. Moreover, the condition of the ship's recovered trawling equipment was reported by a technical inquiry to not be consistent with a submarine entanglement.

The motorized fishing vessel (MFV) was built in 1986 by the Bretagne Sud shipyard in Belz. Its name means "Children of Brittany" in the Breton language.

== The accident ==
Location of the incident

Bugaled Breizh capsized with five sailors about 14 nautical miles (26 km) southwest of Lizard Point, Cornwall on 15 January 2004 at 12h25 UTC. Weather in the area at the time was southwesterly winds of 25-30 knots and 2-3 mile visibility. The ship briefly radioed that it was sinking, and disappeared apparently very quickly; only two bodies of the five sailors were recovered at the time, while a third body was recovered on 10 July 2004 during salvage operations in 90 metres of water depth.

== Inquiry ==
Immediately investigations were started by the French authorities in Quimper. Several explanations were advanced to explain the capsizing including a fishing accident, collision with a surface ship, rock or wreck, the presence of a sandbank, and an accident involving a submarine. In June 2004 the ship was raised for forensic examinations. The fish hold showed a compression due to the water pressure. In the absence of evidence of any ramming, the hypothesis of a collision with a surface ship could be abandoned.

=== Submarine entanglement theory ===
Several hours after the sinking an announcement was made by the French Maritime Prefect for the Atlantic that a NATO naval exercise involving submarines was taking place in the area. The Dutch submarine Dolfijn was one of the first ships to reach the site of the sinking and was suspected to be involved in the accident. The British submarine Turbulent was also suspect as it was sent for repair after the exercises. However, according to authorities Dolfijn was at least 15 kilometres (8.1 nmi) away and the Royal Navy indicated as well that its submarines were not at the site where Bugaled Breizh sank. Other reports mention that the U-22, the British nuclear attack submarine Torbay, and two French nuclear attack submarines, Rubis and Saphir, were also present in the vicinity. Another submarine noted in the area was Triumph. Further, there was apparently a submarine of unknown origin that was observing the NATO manoeuvres.

The hypothesis that Bugaled Breizh was sunk by an accident with a submarine can explain a number of unusual observations. The ship apparently sank very rapidly, there was no launching of any rescue boat, and the help signal was brief, without giving the coordinates. The trawler line of the ship was drawn out on the port side in contrast to the starboard one. The long cable is also reported to have traces of titanium; it has been proposed that this originates from the surface of a submarine.

NATO documents have been declassified and were released to the French judiciary. The Minister of Defense Michèle Alliot-Marie indicated to the National Assembly that the information she had did not allow her to suspect a submarine as the cause of the accident. She indicated that the British and French authorities had cooperated and provided a list of all their ships and submarines in the area of interest. Also, the titanium issue was considered trivial as titanium dioxide is a common pigment of marine paint including the one used for Bugaled Breizh.

The report of the French Marine Accident Investigation Office (Bureau d'enquêtes sur les événements de mer or BEAmer) was published on 27 November 2006 and examined a number of possible causes; it rejected the proposition that fishing lines got entangled with a military submarine and concluded that "the hypothesis that the fishing line got buried in a sandbank is more consistent with the evidence." However, the hypothesis of a fishing accident was received with scepticism by the fishing community. It believed that the governmental BEA — it is under the jurisdiction of the Ministry of Transport — tried to avoid a diplomatic incident with the military and its allies. An analysis of the French Institute of Research for the Exploration of the Ocean subsequently rejected the proposition of BEAmer as impossible.

Expert testimony indicated that a nuclear submarine that got entangled in the net of a trawler could pull down a vessel of about 250 tons within 80 seconds.

A recent newspaper article states that an unnamed witness thought that British submarine Turbulent may have been involved in the ship's sinking. However Judge Brigette Lamy said she agreed with reports that the submarine was in Plymouth at the time.

On 9 September 2015 the British Minister for the Armed Forces, Penny Mordaunt, recognised that a British submarine caught the trawl of the Irish fishing trawler "The Karen" on 15 April 2015, in an incident similar to that of the Bugaled Breizh.

=== Conclusion of inquiry without specific cause ===
On 31 July 2008, the judges Richard Foltzer and Muriel Corre, who had been charged with the inquiry into the sinking of Bugaled Breizh, after having received expert testimony, issued a statement that a "highly probable cause" that the vessel sank was as a result of an accident with a nuclear attack submarine. However, they were unable to indicate which submarine was involved and indicated also the possibility that the accident may have been caused by the unidentified spy submarine or other technically feasible causes. As such the relatives of the dead sailors and the owner of the ship have not received any compensations.

While other causes for the ship's loss are possible, this accident and others with a clearer attribution to nuclear submarines suggest that submarines operating in fishing zones represent a danger to fishing trawlers who when "catching" a submarine may be at significant risk of being pulled under. The Celtic League indicates that accidents with submarines may have accounted for the loss of more than 20 motorized fishing vessels since 1970 with the loss of over 150 sailors and demands better communication between the military and the civilian authorities.

== Media ==
Book

- Richard, Laurent; Turay, Sébastien (January 2007). Le Bugaled Breizh, les secrets d'états autour d'un naufrage. First. ISBN 978-2-7540-0297-4.

Television

- Marie, Serge (2005). L'énigme du Bugaled Breizh.

== See also ==
- FV Antares
