= Submarine (Clancy book) =

1993 book by Tom Clancy and John D, Gresham

Submarine: A Guided Tour Inside a Nuclear Warship
- First edition cover
- Author: Tom Clancy and John D. Gresham
- Language: English
- Series: Guided Tour
- Subject: Nuclear submarines
- Publisher: G.P. Putnam's Sons
- Publication date: November 1, 1993
- Publication place: United States
- Media type: Print (Paperback)
- Pages: 384
- ISBN: 0425138739
- Followed by: Armored Cav: A Guided Tour of an Armored Cavalry Regiment

Submarine: A Guided Tour Inside a Nuclear Warship is a non-fiction book written by Tom Clancy and defense systems analyst John D. Gresham. Released on November 1, 1993, it is the first entry in Clancy's Guided Tour series of non-fiction books, which explore several different facets of the United States military. Submarine particularly explores the inner workings of two submarines, USS Miami and HMS Triumph.

Some editions of the book have a photo section in the middle; some have a special chapter on the Seawolf and Virginia-class submarines. The chapter 'Other people's submarines' has the history and other information about the submarines of other countries. The foreword in the Penguin edition was written by Vice Admiral Roger Bacon. An edition of this book also includes diagrams of various submarines.

== Content ==
"The Silent Service" explores a brief history of the submarine, from the legend of Alexander the Great deploying an earliest iteration of the vessel to the construction of the USS Seawolf, which would later be launched in 1995. "Building the Boats" discusses the lengthy training process of the U.S. submarine crew, construction of submarines in the United States, and several U.S. submarine bases worldwide.
