= HMS Turbulent (S87) =

Trafalgar-class nuclear-powered attack submarine of the Royal Navy

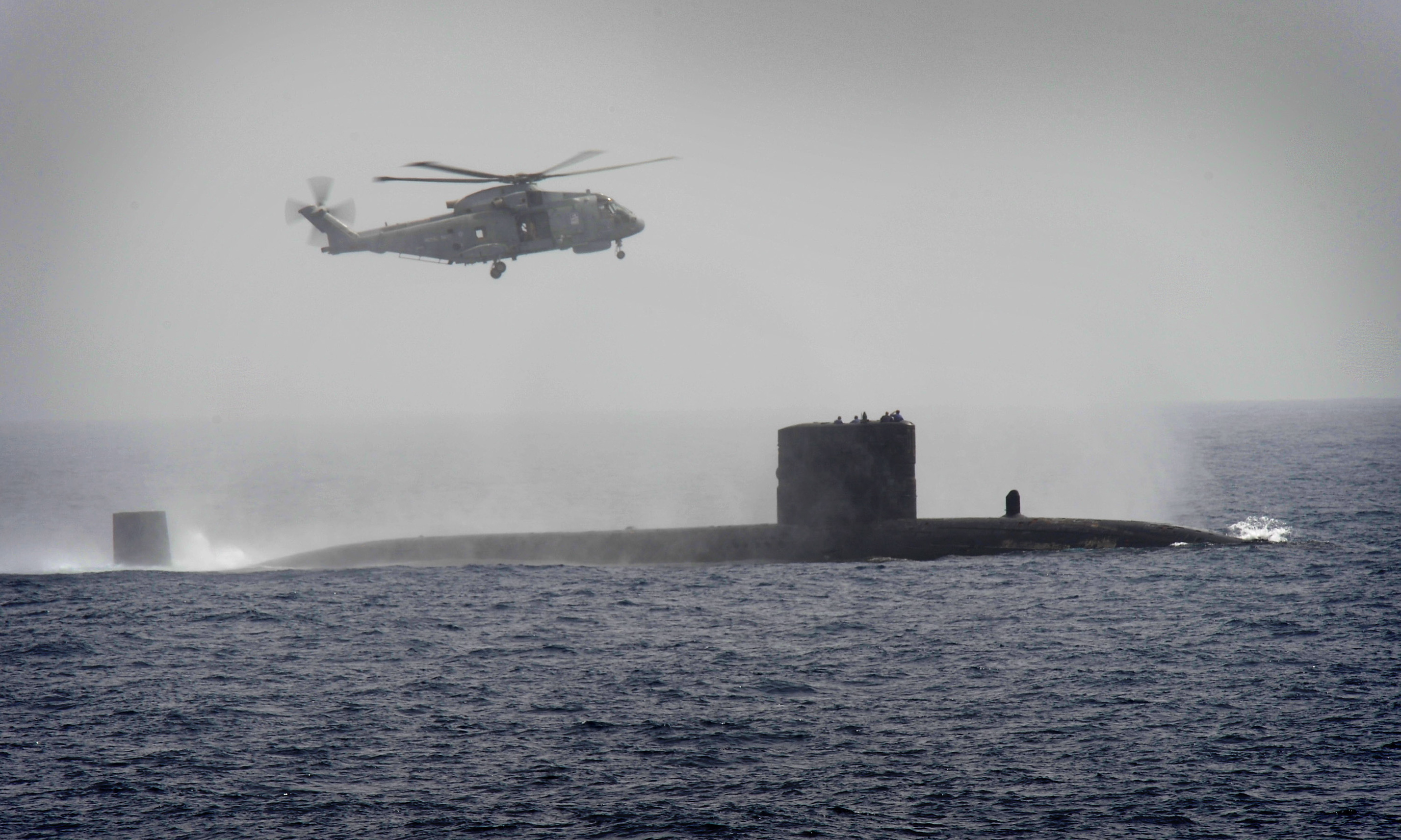
- HMS Turbulent (S87), 2011

History

United Kingdom
- Name: HMS Turbulent
- Ordered: 28 July 1978
- Builder: Vickers Shipbuilding and Engineering, Barrow-in-Furness
- Laid down: 8 May 1980
- Launched: 1 December 1982
- Sponsored by: Lady Cassidi
- Commissioned: 28 April 1984
- Decommissioned: 14 July 2012
- Home port: HMNB Devonport, Plymouth
- Identification: Pennant number: S87
- Status: Awaiting disposal
- Notes: Nicknamed "Turbs"
- Badge

General characteristics
- Class & type: Trafalgar-class submarine
- Displacement: Surfaced: 4,500 to 4,800 t (4,700 long tons; 5,300 short tons); Submerged: 5,200 to 5,300 t (5,200 long tons; 5,800 short tons)
- Length: 85.4 m (280 ft)
- Beam: 9.8 m (32 ft)
- Draught: 9.5 m (31 ft)
- Propulsion: 1 × Rolls-Royce PWR1 nuclear reactor, HEU 93.5%; 2 × GEC steam turbines; 2 × WH Allen turbo generators; 3.2 MW; 2 × Paxman diesel generators 2,800 shp (2.1 MW); 1 × pump jet propulsor; 1 × motor for emergency drive; 1 × auxiliary retractable prop
- Speed: Over 30 knots (56 km/h), submerged
- Range: Unlimited
- Complement: 130
- Electronic warfare & decoys: 2 × SSE Mk8 launchers for Type 2066 and Type 2071 torpedo decoys; RESM Racal UAP passive intercept; CESM Outfit CXA; SAWCS decoys carried from 2002
- Armament: 5 × 21-inch (533 mm) torpedo tubes with stowage for up to 30 weapons: Tomahawk Block IV cruise missiles; Spearfish heavyweight torpedoes

HMS Turbulent is a retired Trafalgar-class submarine of the Royal Navy and the second vessel of her class. Turbulent was the fifth vessel, and second submarine, of the Royal Navy to bear this name. She was built by Vickers Shipbuilding, Barrow-in-Furness, and based at HMNB Devonport. She was commissioned in 1984 and decommissioned in July 2012. She was stripped of equipment and now awaits dismantling in number 3 Basin at Devonport.

Originally intended to hunt down Soviet missile submarines, after the end of the Cold War Turbulent spent more time on intelligence gathering missions and landing commando units, as well as firing Tomahawk missiles during the 2003 Iraq war.

== Operational history ==
Turbulent undertook a modernisation program and first nuclear refuelling in 1997.

=== 2003 War in Iraq ===
Turbulent took part in the 2003 invasion of Iraq, firing thirty Tomahawk cruise missiles during the campaign. On 16 April 2003 she was the first Royal Navy vessel to return home from the war. Turbulent arrived in Plymouth flying the Jolly Roger, a tradition in the Royal Navy signifying having fired weapons in anger.

=== 2011 Military Intervention in Libya ===
Turbulent left Devonport in February 2011 for a 268-day deployment East of Suez, which was due to be her final before decommissioning. The deployment saw her operating in the Gulf of Sidra relieving HMS Triumph as part of the British contribution to the Libya intervention. She was then herself relieved by Triumph, before heading through the Suez Canal in June to take up patrol in the Indian Ocean. The boat called into the port of Fujairah, where she rendezvoused with the support ship RFA Diligence. Turbulent returned to Devonport on 14 December 2011, having spent 190 days of her 267-day deployment underwater and travelling more than 38,000 miles A documentary called Royal Navy Submarine Mission on Channel 5 featured Turbulent during this 2011 deployment.

During this deployment, just after sailing from Fujairah on 26 May, Turbulent suffered a catastrophic failure of her air-conditioning systems, while on the surface. Internal temperatures quickly rose to 60 °C with 100% humidity, and caused 26 casualties, mainly from heat exhaustion, eight of which were life-threatening. With ambient temperatures in the Indian Ocean at 42 °C, surface ventilation was ineffective and the submarine was only effectively cooled by diving to 200 metres. The cause was later found to be blockage of water inlet pipes by barnacles during an extended stay at Fujairah. The incident was only made public in 2014.

=== 2012 South Atlantic deployment ===
Turbulent was scheduled to be decommissioned at the end of 2011. In February 2012 it was reported that either Turbulent or HMS Tireless was being deployed to the Falkland Islands amid increasing tension between Argentina and the United Kingdom over sovereignty of the islands. Commander Nick Wheeler took command in December 2011 until decommissioning on 14 July 2012. She is now being stripped of equipment and will await dismantling in 3 Basin at Devonport Dockyard, Plymouth.

== Bugaled Breizh ==
On 10 December 2010, a newspaper article published in Le Marin gives a testimony from anonymous witness who identified HMS Turbulent as involved in the Bugaled Breizh sinking.

== Bibliography ==
- Hutchinson, Robert (2001). Jane's submarines : war beneath the waves from 1776 to the present day. London: HarperCollins. ISBN 978-0007105588.
