= USS Miami (SSN-755) =

Los Angeles-class nuclear-powered attack submarine of the US Navy

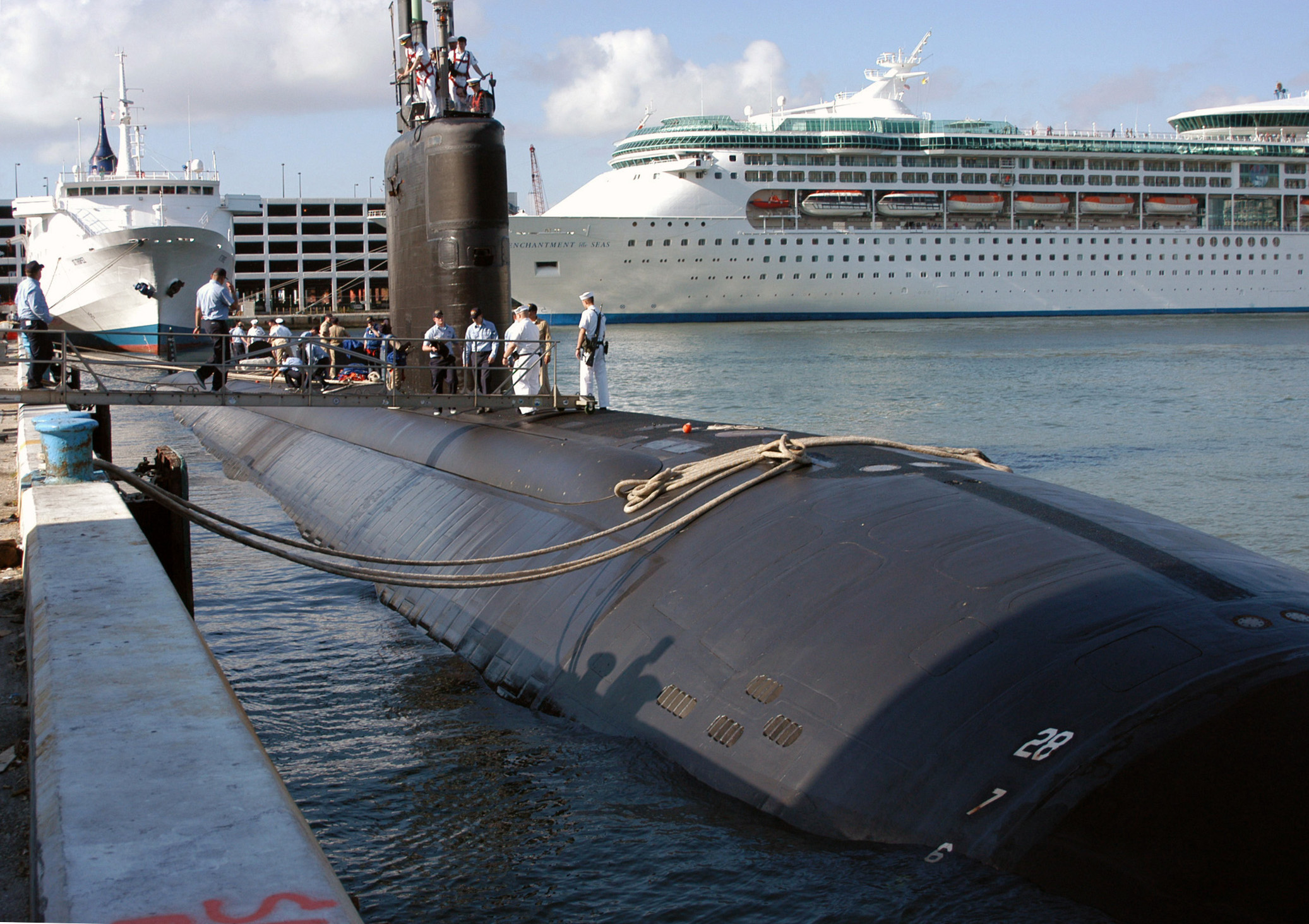
- USS Miami moored to a Port Everglades pier in April 2004.

History

United States
- Name: Miami
- Namesake: City of Miami
- Awarded: 28 November 1983
- Builder: General Dynamics Electric Boat
- Laid down: 24 October 1986
- Launched: 12 November 1988
- Sponsored by: Jane P. Wilkinson
- Commissioned: 30 June 1990
- Decommissioned: 28 March 2014
- Out of service: 8 August 2013
- Stricken: 28 March 2014
- Home port: Groton, Connecticut, U.S.
- Identification: SSN-755
- Motto: "No Free Rides, Everybody Rows!"
- Status: Stricken, to be disposed of by submarine recycling
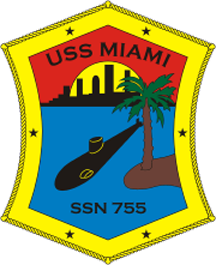
- Badge

General characteristics
- Class & type: Los Angeles-class submarine
- Displacement: 5,751 long tons (5,843 t) light; 6,146 long tons (6,245 t) full; 395 long tons (401 t) dead
- Length: 110.3 m (361 ft 11 in)
- Beam: 10 m (32 ft 10 in)
- Draft: 9.4 m (30 ft 10 in)
- Propulsion: 1 × S6G PWR nuclear reactor with D2W core (165 MW), HEU 93.5%; 2 × steam turbines (33,500) shp; 1 × shaft; 1 × secondary propulsion motor 325 hp (242 kW)
- Complement: 12 officers, 98 men
- Armament: 4 × MK 67 torpedo tubes; 12 × VLS missile tubes

USS Miami (SSN-755) was a Los Angeles-class submarine of the United States Navy. She was the third vessel of the U.S. Navy to be named after Miami, Florida. Miami was the forty-fourth Los Angeles-class (688) submarine and the fifth Improved Los Angeles-class (688I) submarine to be built and commissioned. The contract to build her was awarded to the Electric Boat division of General Dynamics Corporation in Groton, Connecticut, on 28 November 1983, and her keel was laid down on 24 October 1986. She was launched on 12 November 1988 and commissioned on 30 June 1990 with Commander Thomas W. Mader in command.

On 1 March 2012, Miami arrived at the Portsmouth Naval Shipyard in Kittery, Maine, for a scheduled 20-month Engineered Overhaul (EOH) and system upgrades. On 23 May, a shipyard employee started a fire that spread to crew living, command and control, and torpedo spaces. Repairs were initially estimated to require three years and $450 million, an estimate later revised to a range of $450 million to $700 million.

On 6 August 2013, Navy officials said that due to budget cuts, the vessel would not be repaired. The submarine was placed on the inactive list, then decommissioned on 28 March 2014.

== History ==
=== 1999 ===
Miami became the first submarine to conduct combat operations in two theaters since World War II (Operation Desert Fox and Operation Allied Force). The submarine was featured in The Learning Channel (TLC) Extreme Machines episode on "Nuclear Submarines".

=== 2012 fire ===
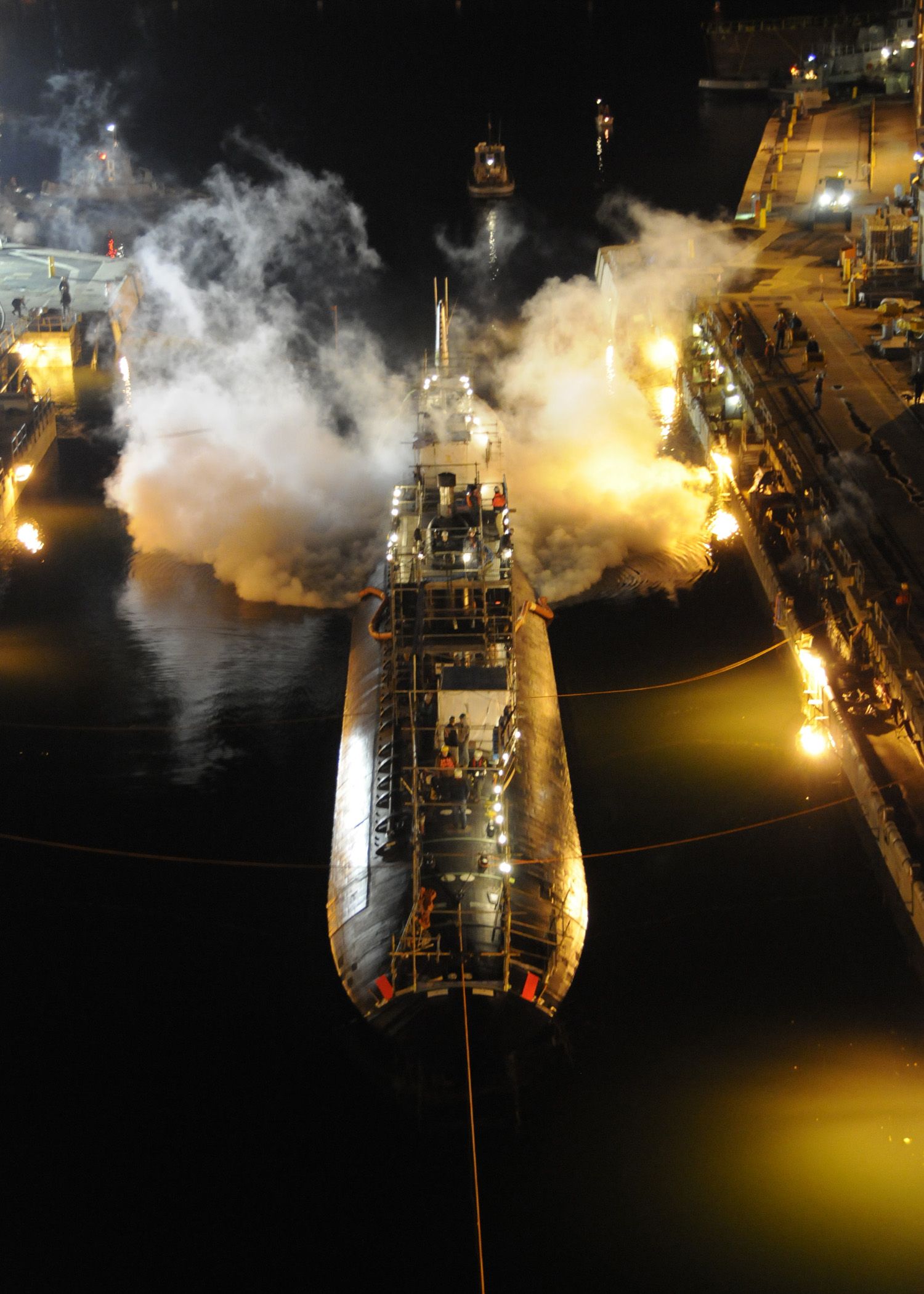
Miami enters dry dock at the Portsmouth Naval Shipyard on 15 March 2012 to begin an engineering overhaul. She was severely damaged by fire two months later.

At 5:41 p.m. EDT on 23 May 2012, fire crews were called with a report of a fire on Miami while she was being overhauled at the Portsmouth Naval Shipyard in Kittery, Maine. At the time, the submarine was in the second month of a scheduled 20-month maintenance cycle, indicating that she was undergoing an extensive "Engineering Overhaul". The national media reported that seven firefighters had been injured. One crew member suffered broken ribs when he fell through a hole left by removed deck plates during the fire. It took firefighters 12 hours to extinguish it.

Initially, the U.S. Navy reported that the fire started when an industrial vacuum cleaner used "to clean worksites on the sub after shipyard workers' shifts" sucked up a heat source that ignited debris inside the vacuum. On 23 July 2012, however, civilian painter and sandblaster Casey J. Fury was indicted on two counts of arson after confessing to starting the fire. Fury said he lit rags on a berthing compartment's top bunk so he could get out of work early. On 15 March 2013, he was sentenced to more than 17 years in federal prison and ordered to pay $400 million in restitution. As of May 20, 2026, Fury was incarcerated at FCI Fort Dix in New Jersey.

The debate over whether to repair or scrap Miami lasted more than a year. Within a month of the fire, Maine Senators Susan Collins and Olympia Snowe advocated repairing the submarine. In July 2012, Navy leaders asked Congress to add $220 million to the operations and maintenance budget for emergent and unfunded ship repairs. In August, the Navy decided to repair the boat for an estimated total cost of $450 million. The repair cost was expected to be trimmed by using spare parts from the recently decommissioned USS Memphis and by repairing rather than replacing damaged hull sections, as had been done with another Los Angeles-class boat, San Francisco. But both of these approaches proved unworkable with the newer Miami. As well, a detailed assessment raised the estimated repair bill to $700 million.

On 6 August 2013, the U.S. Navy announced its intention to decommission Miami, concluding the cost was more than it could afford in a time of budget cuts. The sub was officially decommissioned on 28 March 2014, to be disposed of via the nuclear Ship-Submarine Recycling Program.

== In popular culture ==
- USS Miami is one of two vessels featured in Submarine: A Guided Tour Inside a Nuclear Warship, a 1993 non-fiction book by Tom Clancy.

== Gallery ==
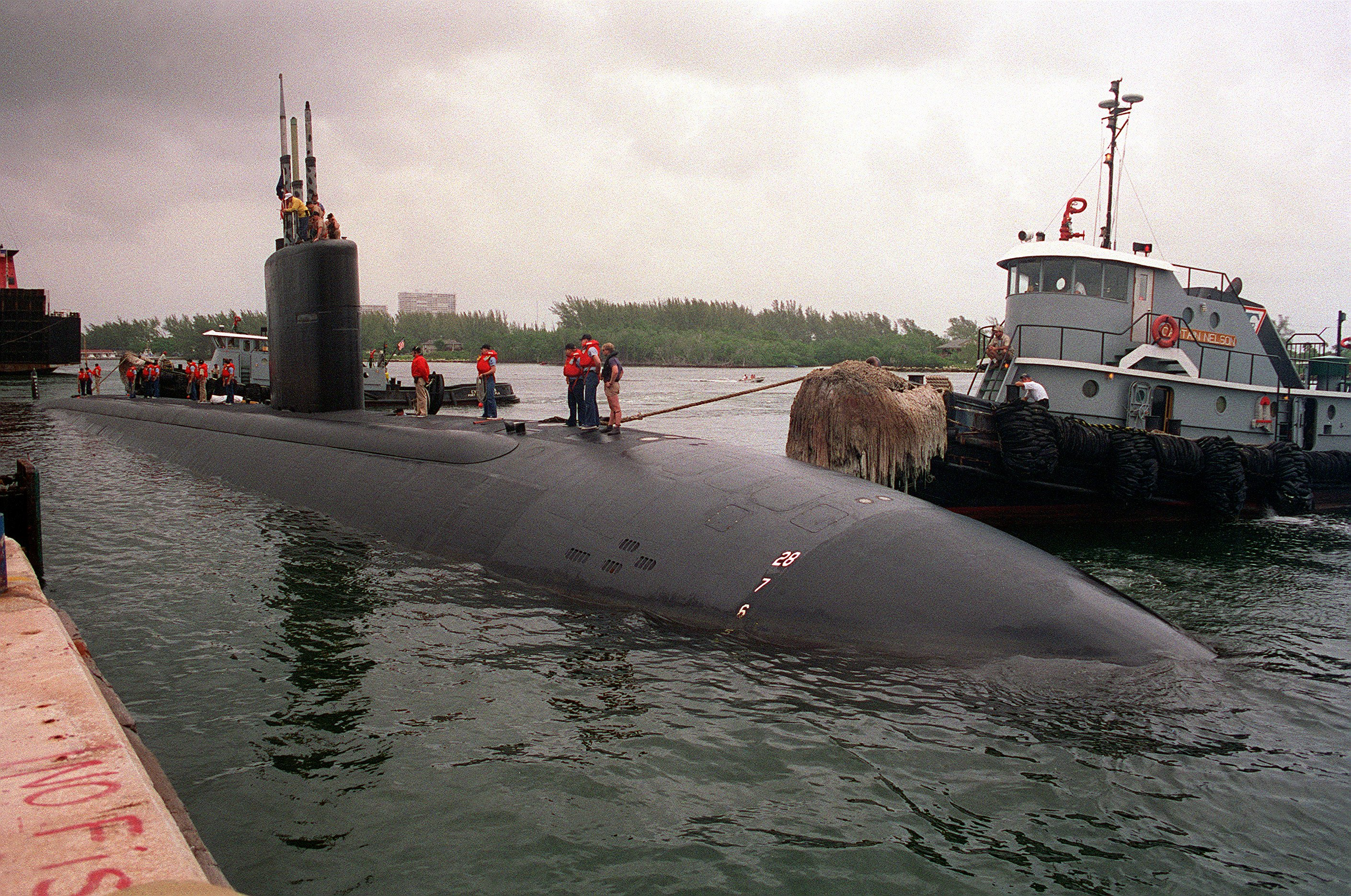
Tugboats maneuver Miami into a berth at Port Everglades, Florida on 17 July 1993.

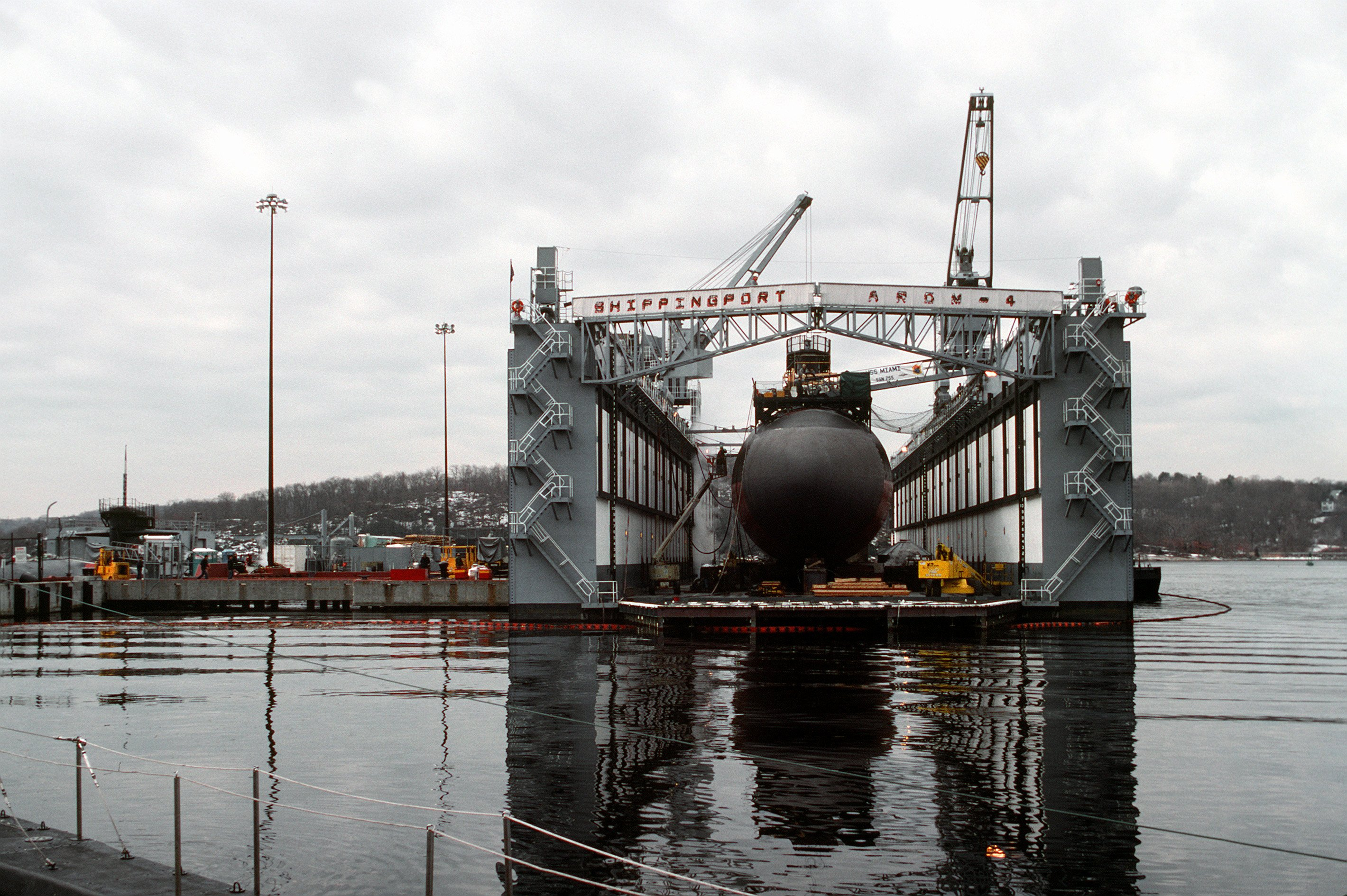
A bow-on view looking down on Miami in the auxiliary medium repair dock Shippingport (ARDM-4) during a routine hull inspection at Naval Submarine Base New London. (16 March 1994)

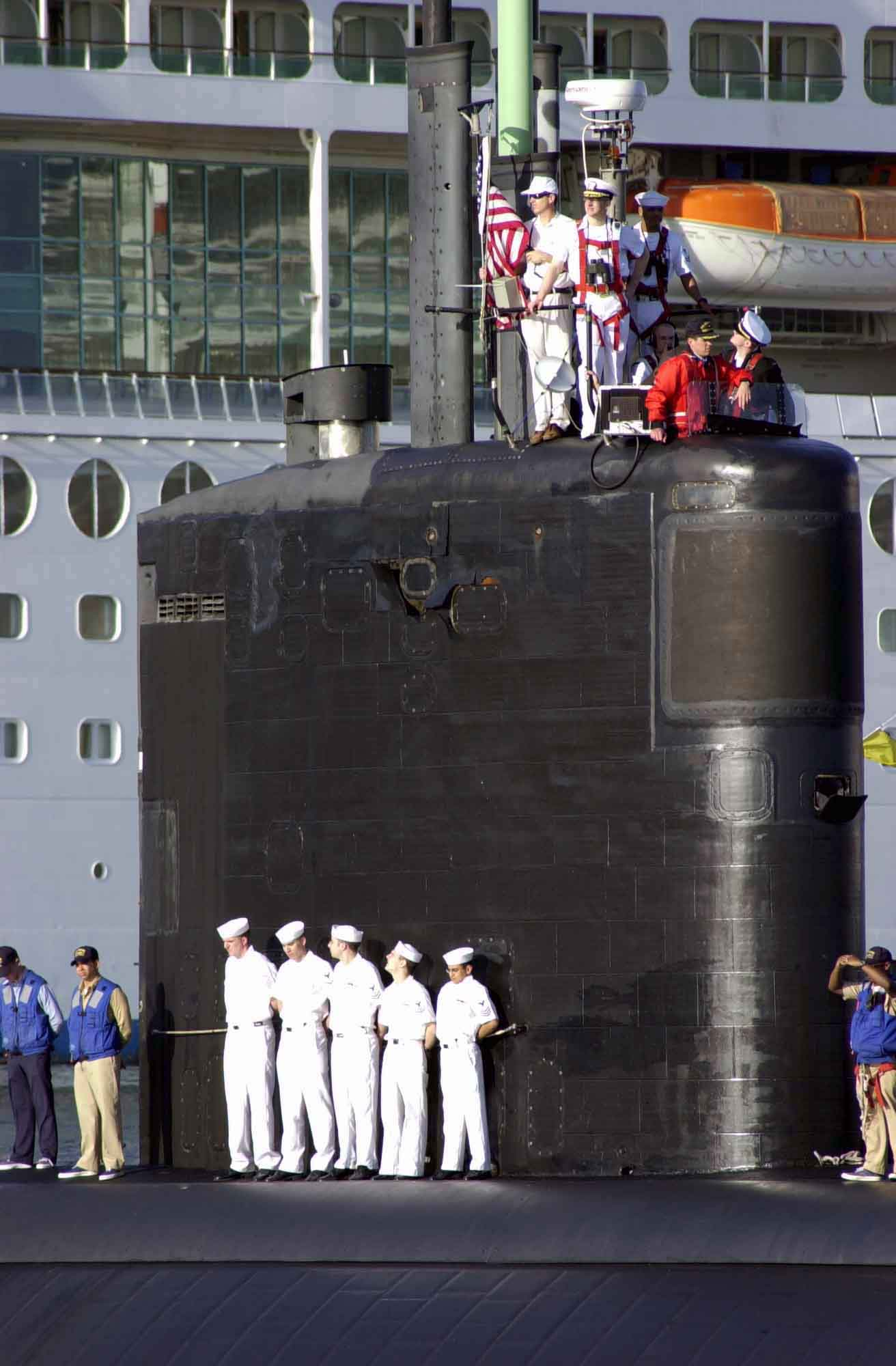
Sailors aboard Miami man the rails as they prepare to moor at Port Everglades, Florida, Fleet Week. (26 April 2004)

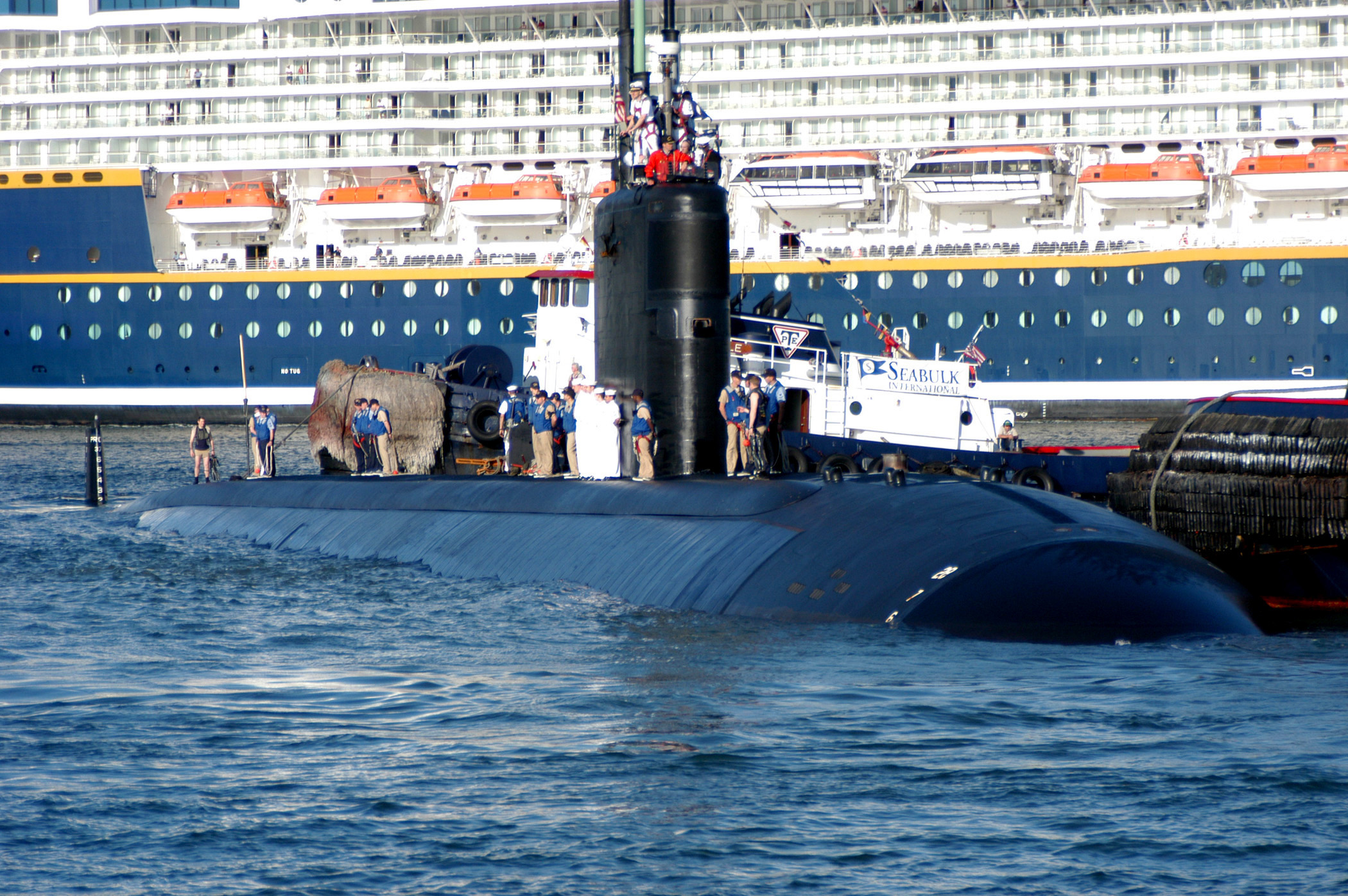
Miami moored at Port Everglades, Florida. (26 April 2004)

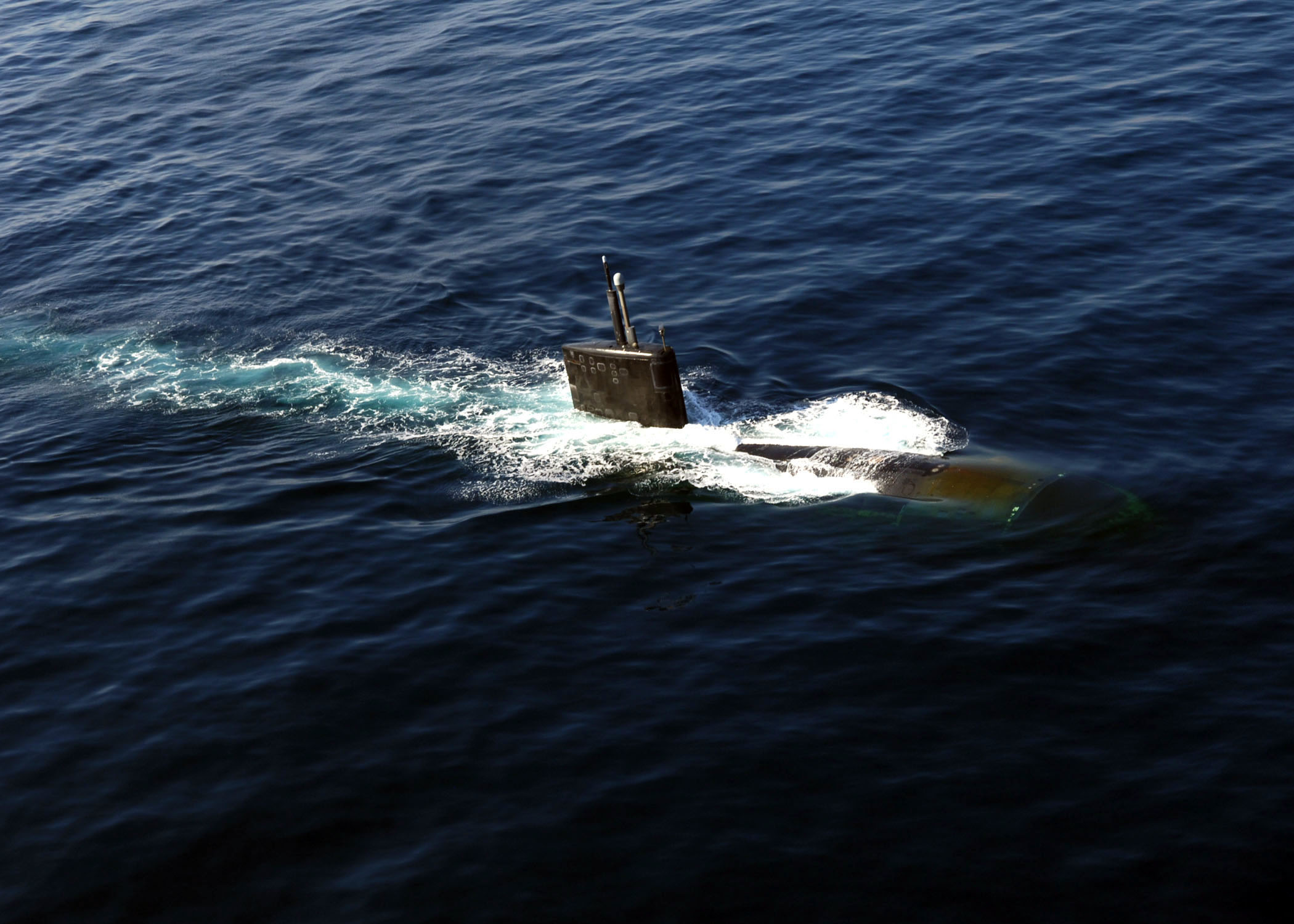
Miami surfaces in the North Arabian Sea during an anti-submarine warfare exercise with the Enterprise Carrier Strike Group. (11 November 2007)

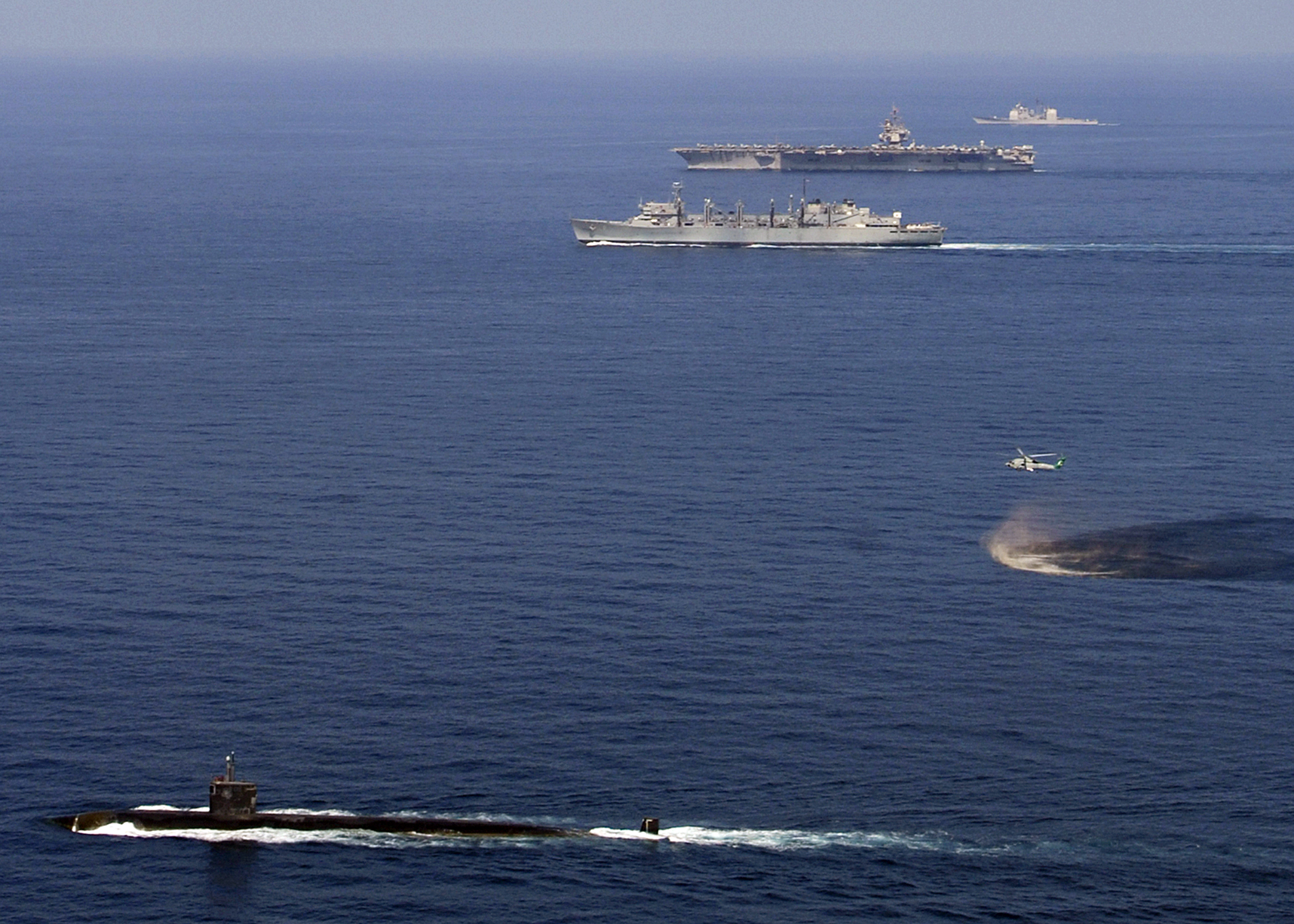
Miami steams through the Arabian Sea accompanied by the USS Enterprise (CVN-65), USNS Supply (T-AOE-6), and USS Gettysburg (CG-64). (11 November 2007)

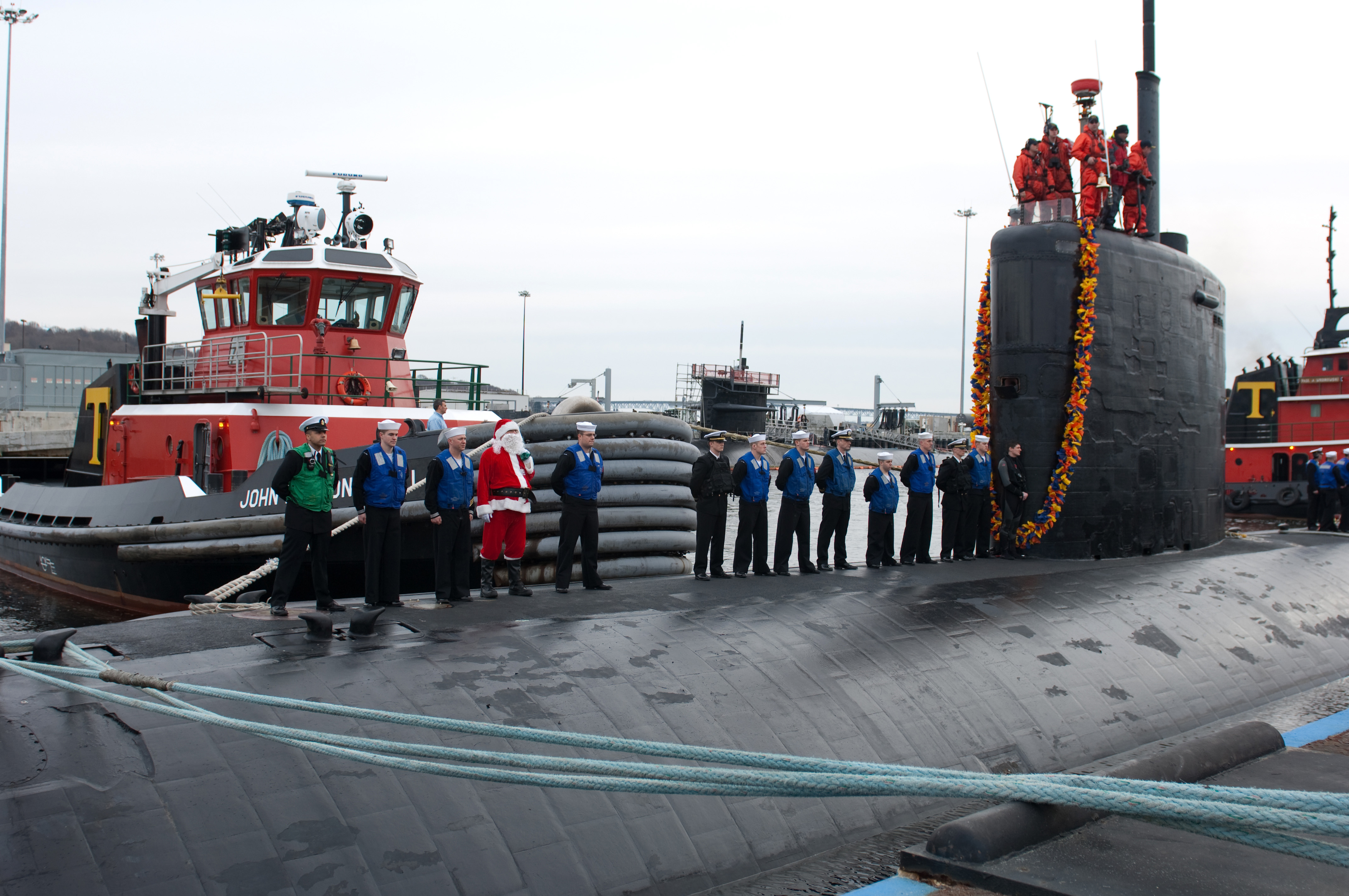
Santa Claus stands with sailors aboard Miami during the submarine's return to Naval Submarine Base New London after an eight-month deployment. (2 December 2009)

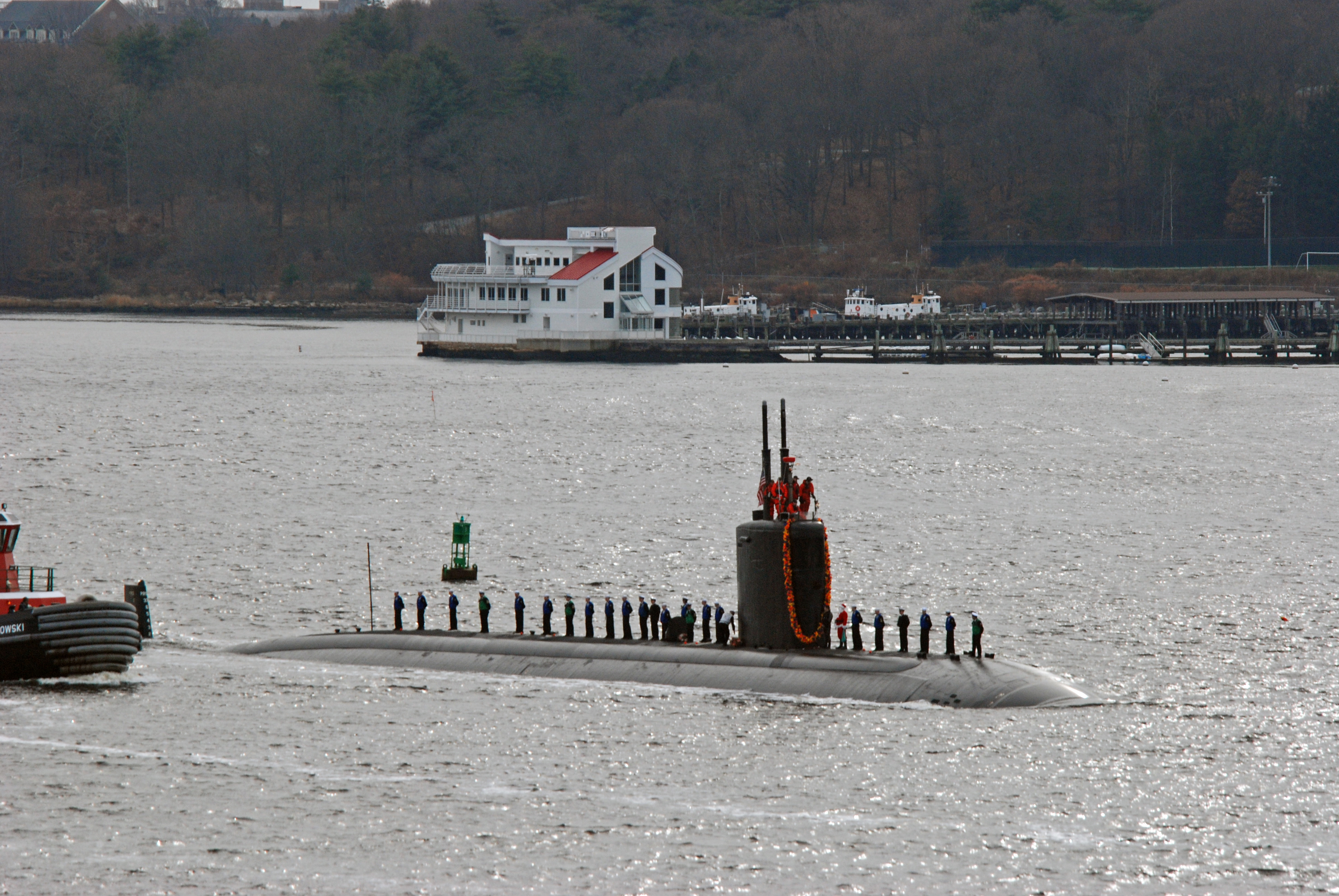
Sailors man the rails as the submarine transits the Thames River en route to Naval Submarine Base New London after an eight-month deployment. (2 December 2009)

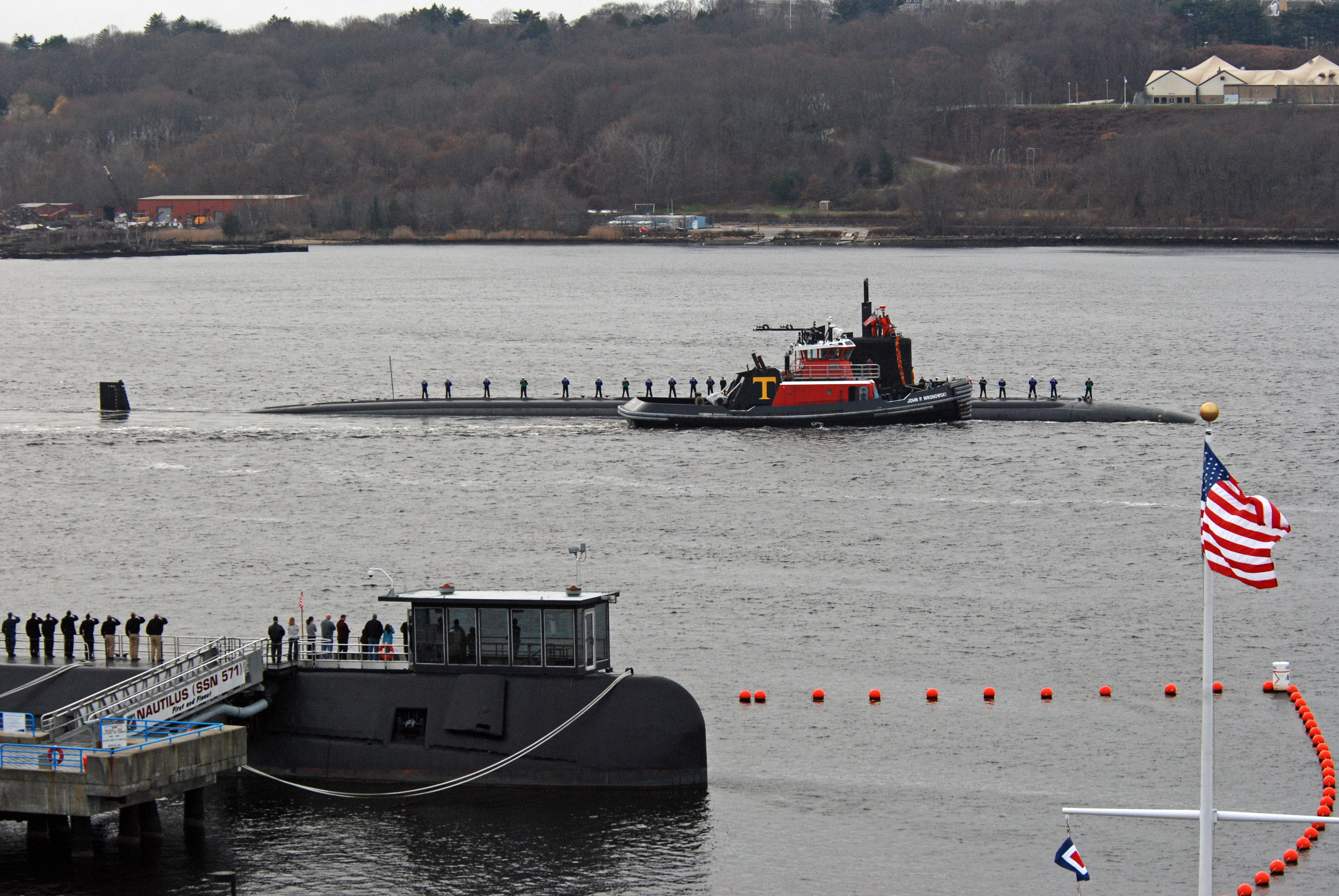
Sailors aboard the decommissioned nuclear submarine Nautilus salute the sailors aboard Miami as the boat returns home to Naval Submarine Base New London following an eight-month deployment. (2 December 2009)

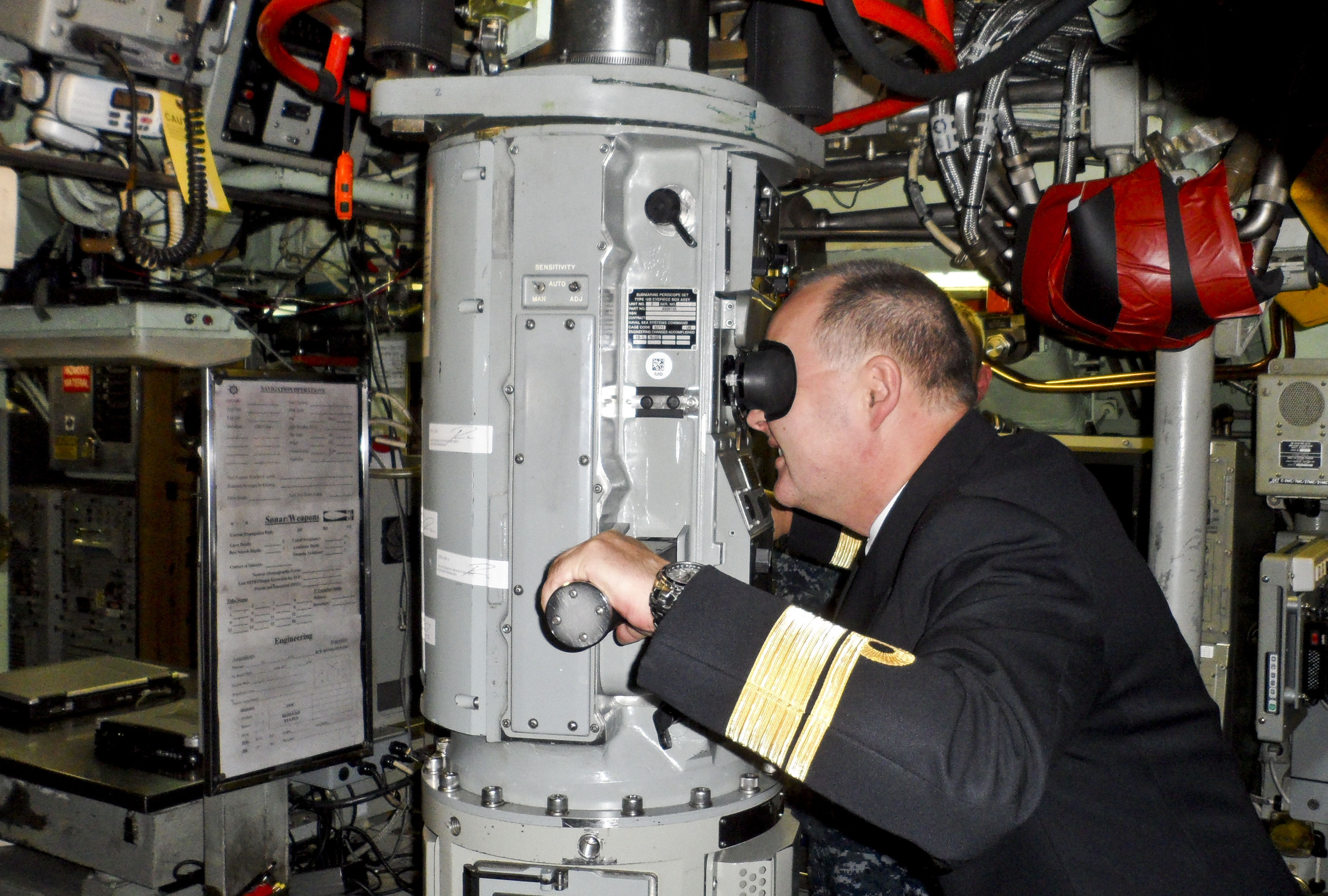
Rear Admiral Bernt Grimstvedt, chief of the Royal Norwegian Navy, looks through the periscope during a port visit to strengthen maritime partnership with Norwegian counterparts. (11 October 2011)

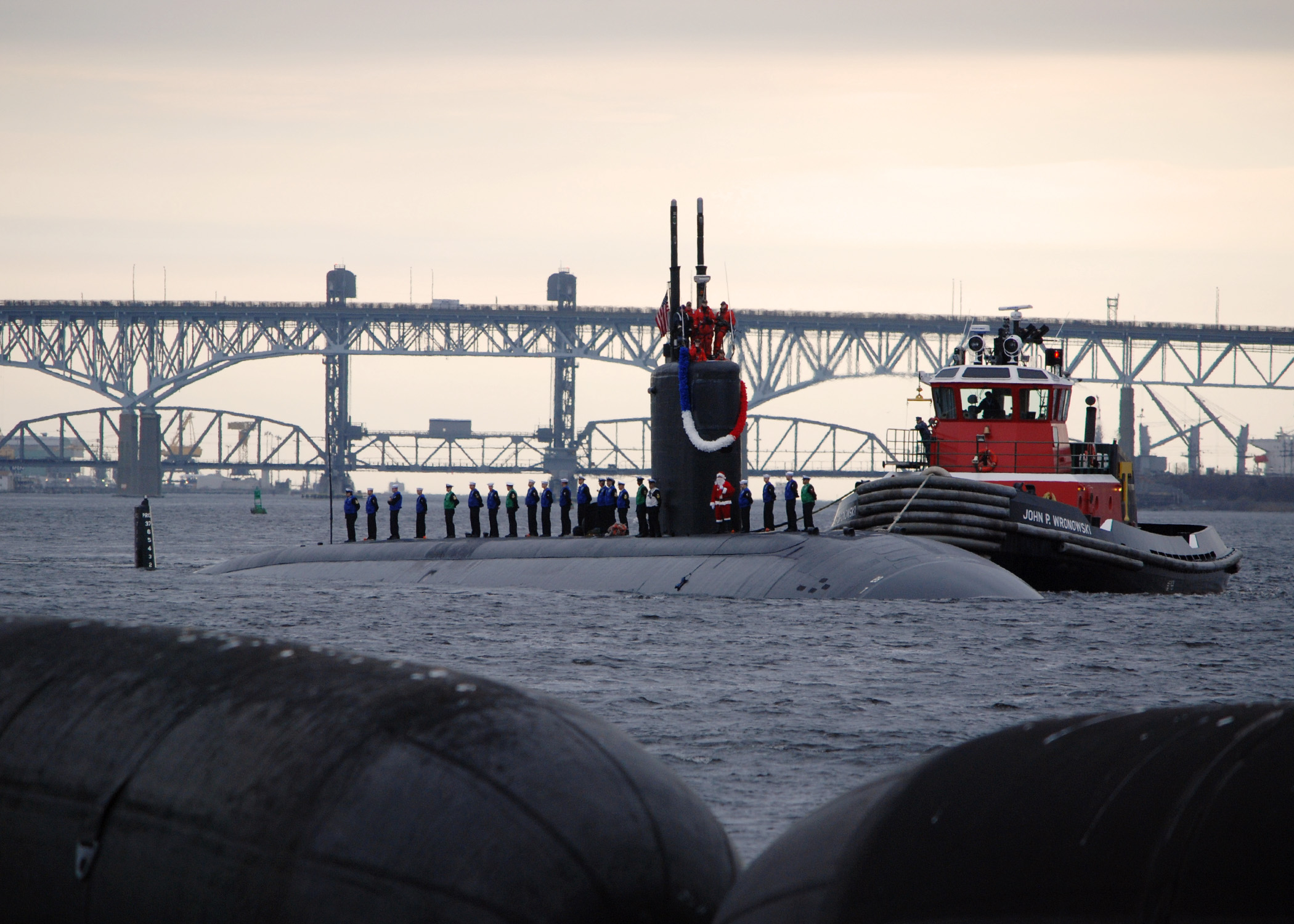
Miami returns home to Submarine Base New London following a five-month deployment conducting operations in the United States Sixth Fleet area of responsibility. (15 December 2011)

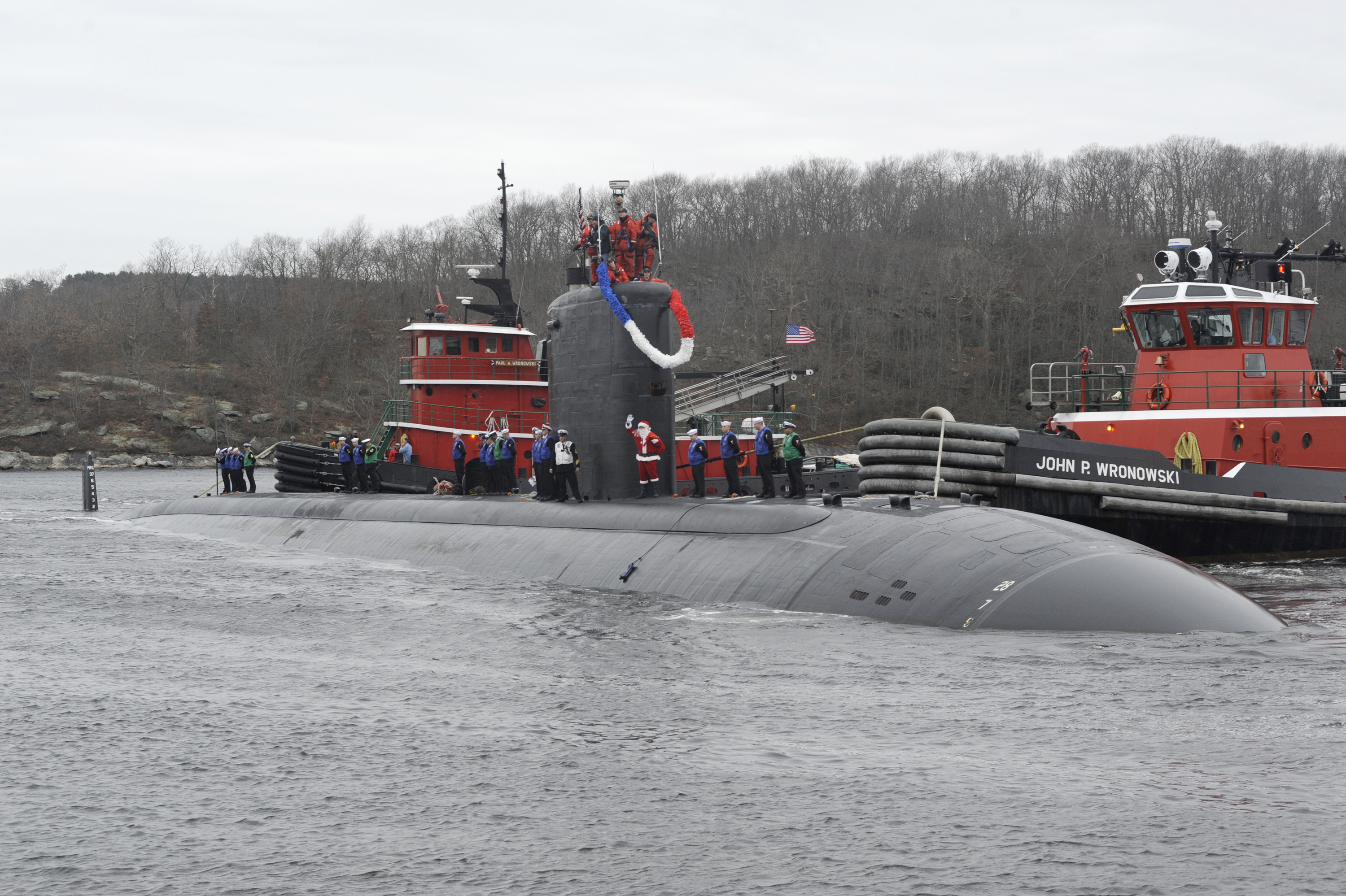
Miami returns home following a five-month deployment. (15 December 2011)
