= Marine accident investigation =

Marine Accident Investigation (MAI) is the process of systematically examining and investigating marine accidents relating to ships or other marine crafts, in order to determine the causes of the accident (collision, fire/explosion, grounding, foundering, and other) and suggest recommendations to avoid accidents in the future. Marine accident investigators have both national and international professional organizations.

The IMO requires all flag states of their registered ships to investigate and report serious marine accidents.

National Administration usually assign their professional investigators conduct marine accident investigation by interview of witnesses, collect evidences and data for accident analysis, the probable causes and findings of the accident are concluded and recommendation are suggested to prevent future occurrence of similar accident in the final accident investigation report for public.

Voyage Data Recorders (VDR) are now installed on most of the oceangoing vessels according to the IMO requirement, VDR have made a substantial contribution to the understanding of accident causes and the improvement of safety. Recorded data has enabled accident investigators to reconstruct events to identify precisely what went wrong and to ensure that effective, rather than convenient, more reliable recommendations can be made to prevent the same thing happening again from the correct lessons learned.
