= Submarine Command Course =

Training course for naval officers preparing to take command of a submarine

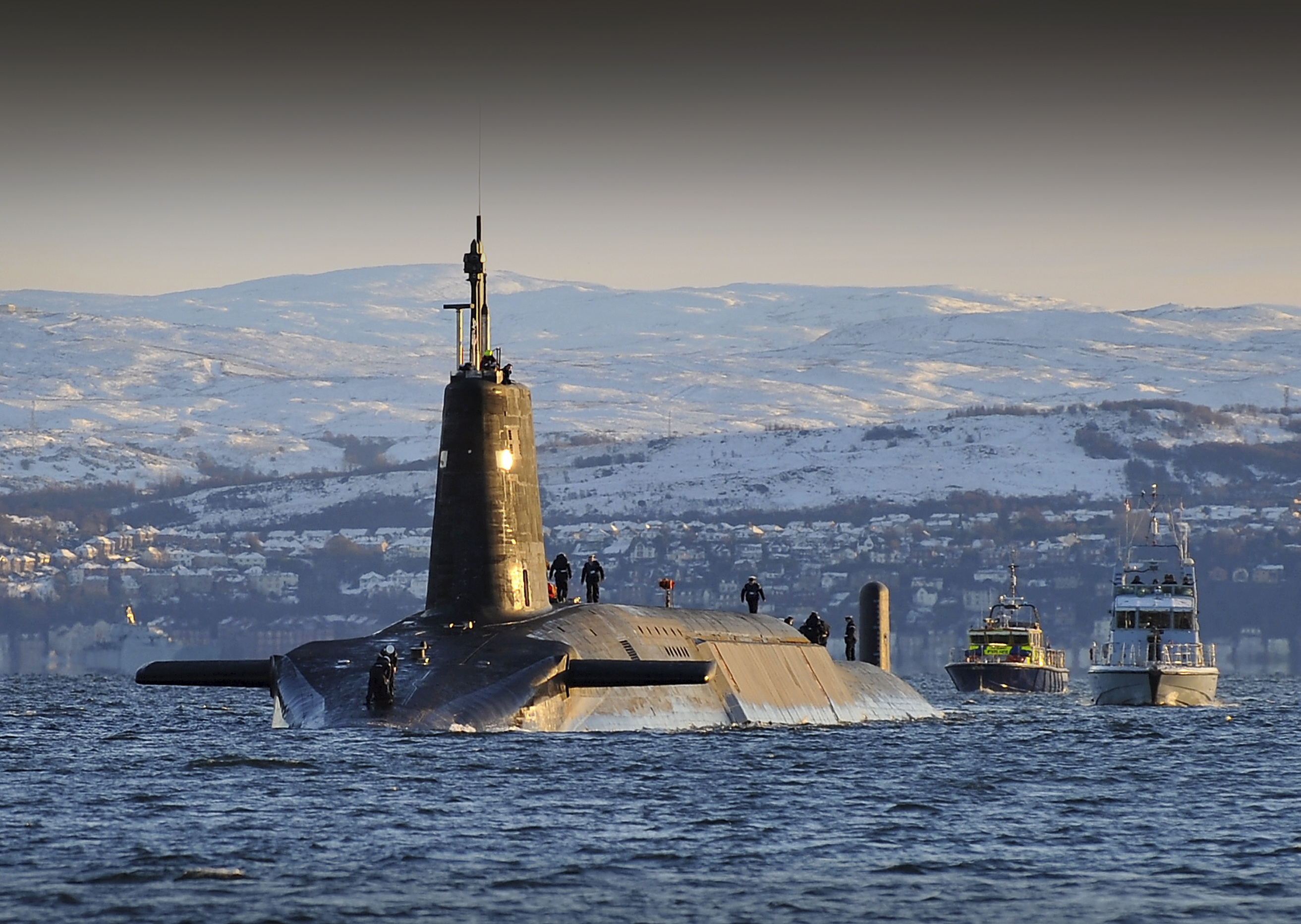
Passing the Submarine Command Course is a requirement to command, or be executive officer on a Royal Navy submarine

The Submarine Command Course (SMCC), previously known as the Commanding Officers Qualifying Course (COQC), is a training course for naval officers preparing to take command of a submarine. It is informally known as The Perisher.

Created by the Royal Navy during World War I, the course was originally intended to address the high attrition rate of submarine commanders, as the previous method of handing down knowledge from officer to officer was prevented by wartime deaths. Following World War II, the Royal Netherlands Navy became involved in the course; the Dutch later partnered with the British to run the course, and following the British conversion to a fully nuclear submarine fleet, took over responsibility for running the course for diesel-electric submarines. Officers from other nations regularly participate.

The four-month course is run in four stages, the first and third involve learning ashore in simulators, while the second involves learning at sea. The fourth phase is the assessment, during which the candidates (of which the maximum is six) show their ability to command a submarine unaided during war-like conditions. The success rate for the SMCC is 60% and, on failing, candidates are prevented from serving on submarines in any capacity.

== Formation and history ==
Prior to World War I, knowledge relating to command of a submarine was passed on from a boat's commander to his replacement. However high attrition rates during the war meant this training could not always be passed on, and the less experienced submarine commanders were in turn more likely to make errors resulting in their death and the loss of the boat. In 1917, the Royal Navy established the COQC for potential commanding officers.

Perisher (as the Submarine Command Course is better known - owing to the fact the course used to be called the Periscope School and those officers attending being referred to as Perishers) is a 24-week course that officers must take prior to serving as an executive officer on board a Royal Navy Submarine. It has been run twice a year since 1917, usually starting on 2 July and 14 November each year. It is widely regarded as one of the toughest command courses in the world.

Following World War II, the Royal Netherlands Navy began to send officers to the course. Until 1995, the Royal Navy and Royal Netherlands Navy were jointly responsible for running the SMCC. In 1995 the Royal Netherlands Navy took over the Perisher course for diesel-electric submarines, since the Royal Navy no longer operates boats of that type.

The SMCC is attended by submariners from other navies, including the Royal Australian Navy, the Brazilian Navy, the Royal Canadian Navy, the Republic of Korea Navy, and the United States Navy. Officers of the Royal Danish Navy also attended, prior to Denmark's withdrawal of its submarine capability. Overseas candidates attend the course because its high standards enjoy widespread respect, and because it fosters links between allied navies and the Royal Navy.

The SMCC was ISO certified in 2004.

== Course structure ==
The diesel-electric course is four months long, with a combination of simulator time ashore and sea time under war-like conditions while operating off the coasts of Norway and Scotland. At most, six students will participate, under the tutelage of an instructor referred to as Teacher. The course has four stages, the first of which is training on Dutch Walrus class submarine simulators at Den Helder. The second stage, known as COCKEX (a corruption of the old COQC name plus the standard shorthand for exercise), takes the candidates to sea, where they practise the skills learned in the simulators, along with tactical safety training. They return to the simulators for stage three, where they are taught both the tactical aspects (including rules of engagement, evasion measures, and interception procedures) and personnel management skills (including stress management, maintaining working conditions, and medical skills) of commanding a submarine, while learning other skills required for command. On conclusion, the students return to sea for the 'Cockfight', where Teacher evaluates each submariner's ability to command a submarine independently. During this, the candidates will be run through multiple war-like exercises with little respite between each. One example of the type of exercise, from the 2004 course, required the candidate to take their submarine into a harbour (simulating a naval base) to lay mines, with less than 6 metres (20 ft) of clearance between the fin and ferries passing overhead, and even less distance between the keel and the harbour floor, while a warship used active sonar to hunt for the submarine.

Students who fail the course are, in most cases, no longer permitted to serve on submarines in any capacity. According to Commander Marc Elsensohn, Teacher for the 2004 diesel-electric course, the main reasons for failing are that the candidate regularly loses situational awareness, or shows a narrow focus or over-reliance on one tool or aspect of operations. Making mistakes does not cause a student to fail automatically, as long as the mistake is recognised and corrected before the submarine is endangered.

If at any point during the training a candidate is withdrawn from training he will be nominated for boat or helicopter transfer and kept occupied until the transfer. Their bag is packed for them and they are notified of the failure when the helicopter or boat arrives. On departure they are presented with a bottle of whisky. A failure on Perisher means that the unsuccessful candidate is not permitted to return to sea as a member of the Submarine Service (although they are still allowed to wear the dolphin badge). They are, however, permitted to remain in the Royal Navy, moving into the surface fleet.
