= History of aviation in Bangladesh =

The history of aviation in Bangladesh began with kites, the traditional heavier-than-air man-made object, that is flown by one or more people while staying on the ground. The first recorded manned flight was arranged by the Dhaka Nawab Family in 1892, which resulted in the death of the flyer.

== Early era ==
=== Unmanned flight ===
Kite flying was one of the many different forms of entertainment of the elite people of Dhaka, since the Mughal period. It became a festive tradition during the period of Nayeb-e-Nazim Nawajesh Mohammad Khan in the 1740s. Kite flying is still a popular pastime in Bangladesh, especially right after the monsoon. In the older parts of Dhaka it is one of the most popular activities. Kite painting was a specialised art form in the 18th century in Bangladesh. Some kites of Bengal has been known to keep flying for three months. They were big kites tied to anchors with stout ropes.

Kite flying festival had long been a major festival. The Chaitra Sankranti festival (known as Shakrain or Hakrain in Old Dhaka) is celebrated annually on the last day of the Bengali calendar (30th Choitro, mid April). Traditionally, kite flying and boat racing have been events at the festival. Combating fighter kite flyers trying to slash each other's carefully sharpened kite-string is a major part of the competition. In West Bengal, the major kite flying festival happens on the day of Makar Sankranti or end of winter (mid January), and Vasant Panchami (late February).

=== First manned flight ===
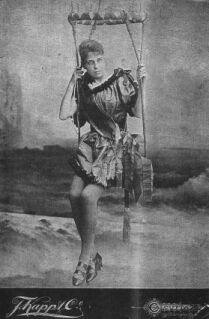
Jeanette Rumary (as "Jeanette Van Tassell") performed with Park Van Tassell when she died following the first manned flight in Bangladesh in 1892.

Jeanette "Jenny" Rummary (performing as "Jeanette Van Tassell" along with Park Van Tassel), was a young balloonist from the United States, was hired as a part of the Van Tassell Troupe by the then incumbent Nawab Khwaja Ahsanullah to make a balloon ascension and parachute descent. She had made several previous parachute descents across India since October 1891. At 6.20 pm on 16 March 1892, she launched from the bank of the Buriganga River opposite from the Ahsan Manzil. Ascending in the balloon, she jumped via parachute as planned to make her descent but was caught in a Casusrina tree in Ramna Park. During her rescue, she fell to the ground and died two days later from her injuries. She was interred in the Christian Cemetery at Narinda, Dhaka.

=== World War II ===
Thunderbolts in East Bengal during Burma Campaign

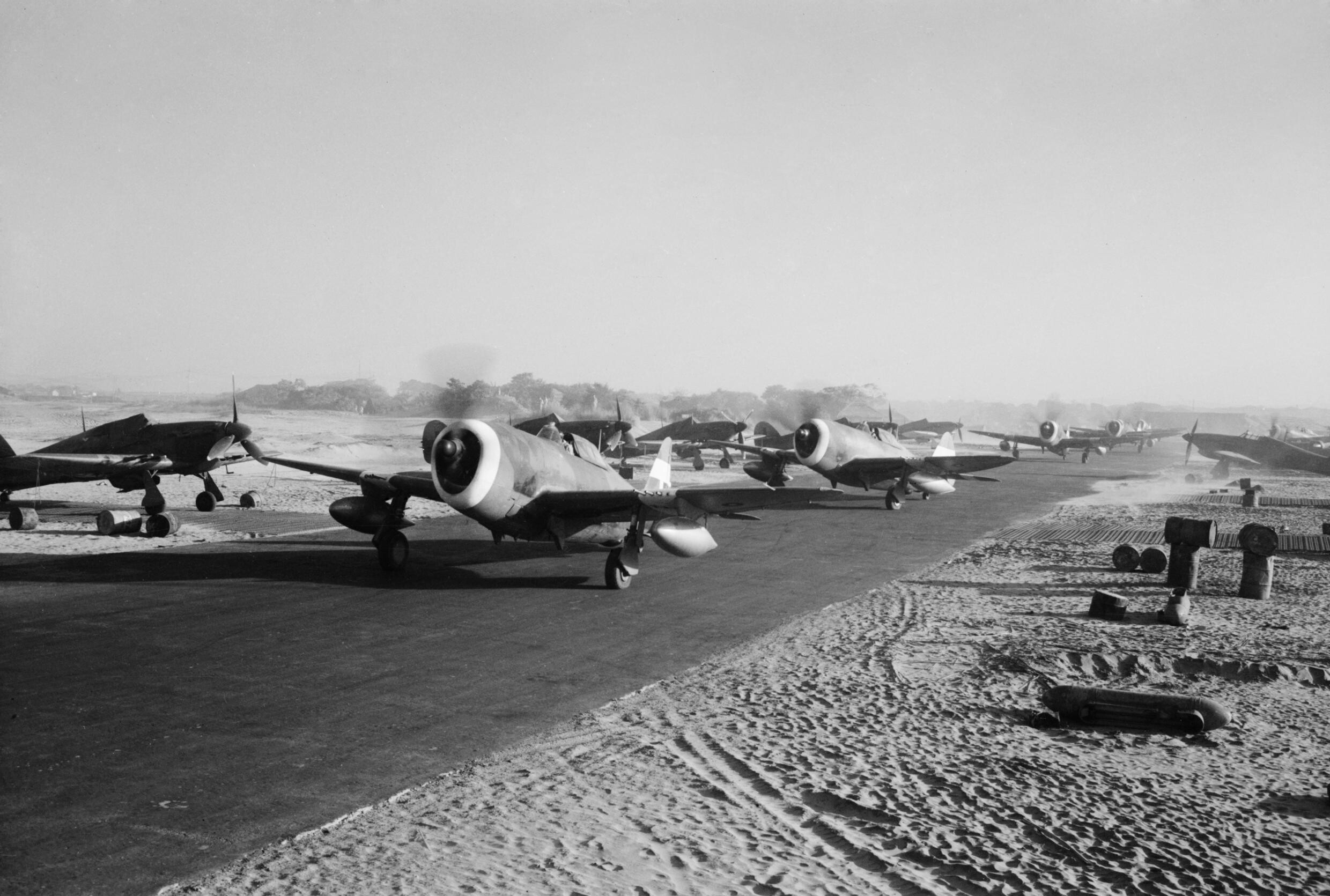
Thunderbolts of No. 30 Squadron RAF taxiing past a line of Hawker Hurricane Mark IICs, at Cox's Bazar

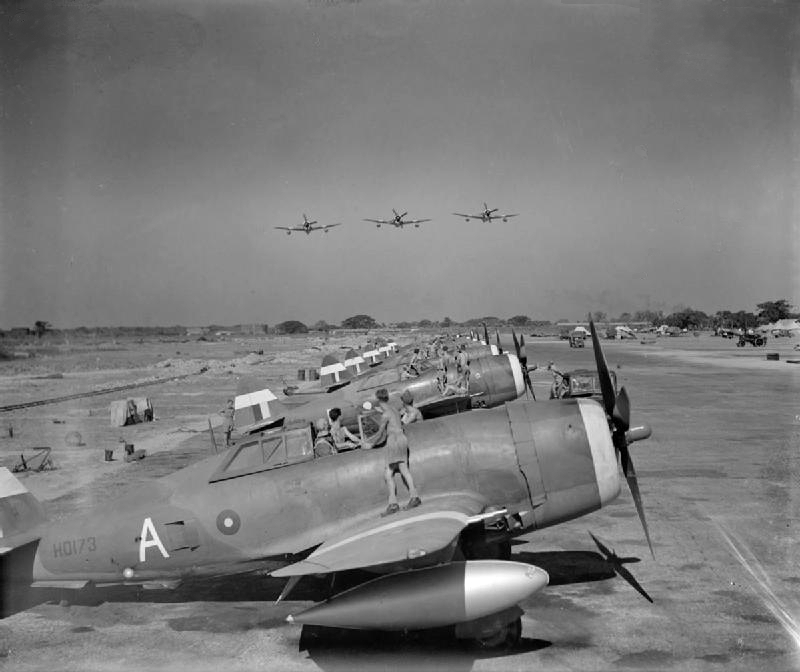
Thunderbolt Mark Is of No. 135 Squadron RAF lined up, being overflown by three other Thunderbolts at Chittagong

Modern aviation in modern Bangladesh area began when the British Government of India built a Royal Indian military airstrip in Tejgaon during World War II to fly warplanes towards the battle fields of Kohima and war theatres in Burma. Other airstrips were built in Comilla, Feni, Chittagong, Cox's Bazar, Chakaria, Sylhet, Jessore, Rajshahi and Lalmonirhat.

In August 1943, a South Asia Command was formed under Admiral Mountbatten, including the RAF Third Tactical Air Force (Third TAF), which launched the second Burma Campaign against the Empire of Japan in the December that year. The Royal Indian Airforce (RIAF), Indian part of the Royal Air Force played a crucial role by providing tactical reconnaissance and extensive close support to the army when a British Corps started advancing down the Arakan coast in January 1944.

In November 1943, 6 Squadron and later 8 Squadron were moved to Cox's Bazar. By the end of February 1944, No 6 Squadron pilots had completed over 1,000 operational sorties, averaging 6 sorties a day per pilot, a record for the entire the Third TAF. Towards the end of March 1944, 4 Squadron joined the operations when it was moved first to Feni airfield, and then to Comilla in June to replace 6 Squadron. In March 1944, the squadron moved to Feni for operations against the Japanese. The role of the squadron was to provide close Air support to the XIV Army. It was from Feni that the squadron carried out its first operational sorties by providing fighter escort to Dakota, engaged in supply dropping missions in the northern Burma. From August 1944 to January 1945, No. 4 Squadron was based at Cox's Bazar and carried out CAS, interdiction and tactical recce operations.

In May 1944, 9 Squadron was moved to Comilla after a brief spell of tactical reconnaissance duties supporting the battles of Imphal and Kohima. During August 1944, the two squadrons carried out intensive bombing of Japanese positions in the Sangu River valley, specially for three consecutive days in Labawa to support an offensive by 81 Division to expel the Japanese from the area. By the end of December 1944, 10 Squadron had also been moved into the operational area at Ramu. With the fall of Rangoon on 3 May 1945, the operations in Burma were reduced to mopping up of small pockets of resistance. By the end of June, most of the Royal Air forces squadrons were withdrawn, leaving only 8 Squadron to assist in the mopping up.

The Shahjalal International Airport originated in 1941, during the second world war, as the British government built a landing strip at Kurmitola, several kilometres north of Tejgaon, as an extra landing strip for the Tejgaon Airport. At that time Tejgaon was a military airport, to operate warplanes towards the war fields of Kohima (Assam) and Burmese war theatres. Shah Amanat International Airport was a combat airfield as well as a supply point and photographic reconnaissance base by the United States Army Air Forces Tenth Air Force during the Burma Campaign 1944-1945. Known American units assigned to Chittagong were: 80th Fighter Group, flew P-38 Lightning fighters over Burma between March 1944 and February 1945; 8th Reconnaissance Group, between October and December 1944 (various detachments); and 4th Combat Cargo Group, flew C-46 Commando transports between January and June 1945. Osmani International Airport in Sylhet was built during British rule as Sylhet Civil Airport, partly to check Japanese aggression from Burma. Biman Bangladesh Airlines earns most of its revenue from this airport.

=== Civil aviation ===
A DC-3 from the 1940s

When the war was over, the colonial government decided to build the Tejgaon Airport along with a landing strip at Kurmitola to meet the needs of a Royal Indian Air Force (RIAF) station in Dhaka. In 1946, the Mirza Ahmad Ispahani and his partners formed an airline – Orient Airways – which soon started using the airport as a civil airport. Shifting its base from Kolkata to Karachi when Pakistan was born, Orient Airways started DC-3 flights from Karachi to Dhaka on 7 June 1954, forming a critical connection between the capitals of geographically separated East and West Pakistan. On 11 March 1955, Orient Airways merged with the government's proposed airline, becoming Pakistan International Airlines Corporation, later rechristened as Pakistan International Airlines (PIA).

The Eastern Pakistan Flying Club was established in 1948. By 1960, British Overseas Airways Corporation and Pan American Airways had started operating flights out of Dhaka, PIA had started operating Boeing 707 and Vickers VC10 jet services, and new airports had been established out of former Royal Air Force stations at Jessore, Chittagong, Thakurgaon, Ishwardi, and Comilla. During the 1962 Sino-Indian War, services to East Pakistan (now Bangladesh) were proving to be difficult, therefore PIA placed their Sikorsky S-61 helicopters on these routes until 1966 when conditions improved. In the 1971 war, PIA aided the Pakistan Army by transporting soldiers to East Pakistan in the Indo-Pakistani War of 1971 and lost a couple of its aircraft to Indian Air Force fighters. Between 10 and 13 March, immediately before the war started, Pakistan International Airlines cancelled all their international routes to urgently fly "Government Passengers" to Dacca. These "Government Passengers" were almost all Pakistani soldiers in civilian dress.

=== Incidents and accidents ===
- 1 July 1957: A Pakistan International Airlines Douglas DC-3 (registered AP-AJS), that was performing a flight from Chittagong Patenga Airport to Dhaka Tejgaon Airport crashed into tidal flats in the Bay of Bengal near Charlakhi Island, killing all 20 passengers and four crew on board.
- 2 February 1966: Pakistan International Airlines Flight 17 was a scheduled domestic flight from Dacca to Faridpur in East Pakistan operated by a Sikorsky S-61 twin-engined helicopter. The Pakistan International Airlines helicopter crashed near Fardipur because of a mechanical failure due to insufficient lubrication. Twenty passengers and three crew died, there was just one survivor.
- 2 December 1970: A Cargolux Canadair CL-44 (registered TF-LLG) crashed into farm houses near Dhaka Tejgaon Airport, killing all four crew on board and three people on the ground. The origin of the flight was Hamburg, where it was loaded with 27.5 tons of child food by the Swiss Red Cross. The cargo was intended to help flood victims in East Pakistan. While the flight was approaching Dhaka Tejgaon Airport, the hydraulic gust lock system activated in flight, causing the controls to lock. The crew lost control of the aircraft and it crashed. It was speculated that the lock system had activated as hydraulic back pressure had built up caused by a malfunctioning switch valve when hydraulics were armed on descent.

== Liberation War ==
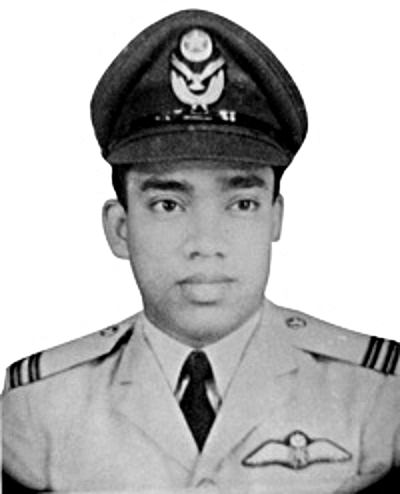
Bir Sreshtho Flight Lieutenant Matiur Rahman

During the 1971 Liberation War of Bangladesh Indian Air Force (IAF) and the Pakistan Air Force (PAF) had fought extensive engagements in the sky over Bangladesh. The first engagement was on 22 November over the Salient of Boyra in West Bengal. In the process Tejgaon Airport suffered extensive damage.

Bangladesh Air Force was organised in India with the initiative of Squadron Leader Sultan Mahmud (Ex-PAF Pilot), Captain Shahabuddin Ahmed (Ex-PIA Pilot), Captain Akram Ahmed (Ex-Plant protection Pilot) and Captain Sattar (ex-PIA Pilot) and Captain Sarfuddin (Ex-PIA Pilot). Later many Bangladeshi ex-PAF Officers joined in Bangladesh Air Force in India. Finally Bangladesh Air Force was formed in late July 1971. Indian Air Force trained these Officers July 1971 through November 1971 as fighter pilots. Bangladesh Air Force first went in action on 3 December 1971 and attacked the Chittagong-based Oil tank depot and oil tank depot was totally destroyed by that air attack. The Air attack was conducted by Capt. Akram Ahmed. The second Bangladesh Air Force attack was on 6 December 1971 at Moulovi Bazar Pakistani Army barracks under the command of Squadron Leader Sultan Mahmud, where Captain Shahabuddin Ahmed was co-pilot.

Then, on the night of 3 December 1971, Canberra bombers of Eastern Air Command struck Tejgaon, which was guarded by PAF No. 14 squadron equipped with Sabre jets which lacked night fighting capability. By the morning of 4 December, strike missions against Tejgaon were assigned to 11 IAF squadrons, including Hunters of the No. 7 Squadron, No. 14 Squadron, No. 17 Squadron and No. 37 Squadron of IAF, as well as Su-7s of No. 221 Squadron and MiG-21s of No. 28 Squadron.

Throughout 4 and 5 December, IAF concentrated in attacking the aircraft on the ground. But, it failed to cause significant damage to the PAF assets in well-dispersed and camouflaged locations. By the evening of 5 December, the IAF changed tactics. On the morning of 6 December four MiG-21s (No. 28 Sqn), flying from Gauhati hit Tejgaon with 1000lber, scoring several hits on the runway. Kurmitola was attacked on the morning of 7 December, when Mig-21s of No. 28 Sqn again hit the runway. No. 7 Sqn was pulled out of the eastern ops on 6 December to help the Indian Army in the west. Repeated attack by MiG-21s and Hunters of No. 14 and No.28 however, kept the runway cratered. The IAF assault effectively grounded the PAF by 7 December, and No. 14 Squadron was taken out of the war. The IAF also bombed other airfields including the abandoned WWII airfields of Comilla, Lalmanirhat and Shamsher Nagar through the war, denying their use to PAF.

On 20 August 1971 Flight Lieutenant Matiur Rahman attempted to pilot a T-33 trainer from Karachi, Pakistan to India to defect from the Pakistan Air Force and join the liberation movement of Bangladesh. However, Matiur could not take the plane out of Pakistani territory, as reportedly, Pilot Officer Rashid Minhas, the other pilot in the plane, forced it to crash in Thatta, a place near the Indian border. Matiur was awarded Bir Sreshtho and Minhas was awarded Nishan-E-Haider, respectively the highest military honours in Bangladesh and Pakistan, and both has air bases named after them, respectively in Jessore and Kamra.

== Post-independence ==
=== Resumption of civil aviation ===
The first civil flight of independent Bangladesh operated from Tejgaon Airport by Capt. A. Rahim on 1 January 1972 with a Cessna 150. The first international flight from Independent Bangladesh destined to Calcutta departed on 10 January 1972. The aircraft, a Douglas DC-3 subsequently crashed, killing the aircrew.

Biman Bangladesh Airlines was formed with one Boeing 707 left behind by PIA.

=== Bangladesh Air Force ===
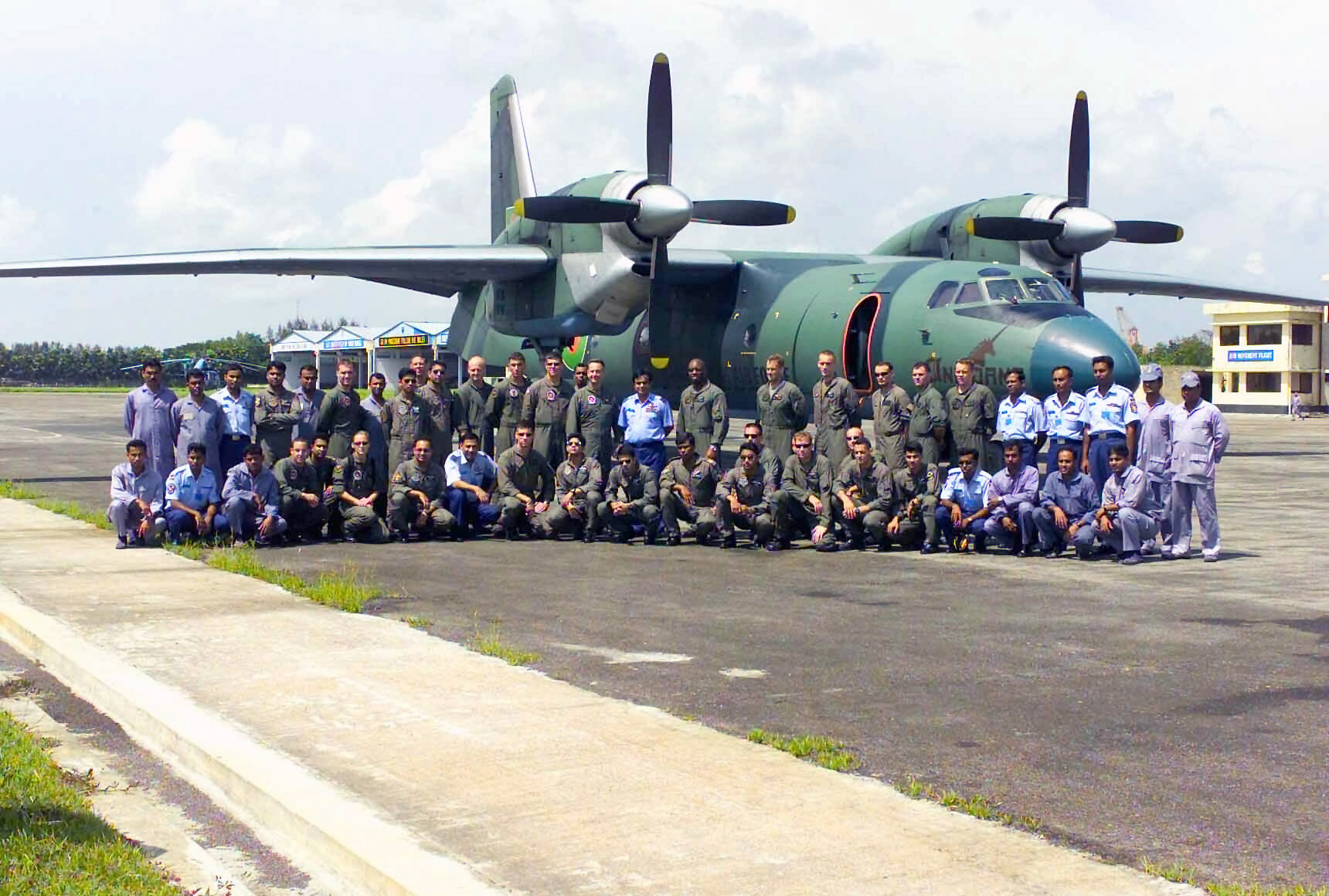
A BAF An-32 Cline

The Bangladesh Air Force (BAF) was formed at Dimapur, Nagaland, India on 28 September 1971 under the command of Air Commodore A.K. Khandker (later Air Vice Marshal and Chief of Air Staff, Bangladesh Air Force). At that time, the nucleus of the (BAF) was formed as 'Kilo Flight' to assist the Mukti Bahini (Freedom Fighters). Initially, 'Kilo Flight' consisted of three aircraft provided by the Indian Air Force, 09 officers and 47 airmen. Squadron Leader Sultan Mahmud (retired as Air Vice Marshal and Chief of the Air Staff of BAF) was appointed as the commander of 'Kilo Flight'. After having some basic training on air to ground weapon delivery, 'Kilo Flight' successfully bombed a fuel storage in Chittagong and Narayangonj area and thus the journey of BAF had commenced. During the last phase of the Bangladesh Liberation War the newly formed Bangladesh Air Force carried out 12 successful attack missions over Pakistani targets.

After liberation in 1971, the Bangladesh Air Force received equipment from the Soviet Union and the People's Republic of China—a clutch of Mikoyan-Gurevich MiG-21 fighters; Antonov An-24 and Antonov An-26 transport aircraft; and Mil Mi-4 helicopters.

Shahjalal International Airport started operation in 1981. It is the home base and hub of Biman Bangladesh Airlines, GMG Airlines and United Airways.

=== Bangladesh Naval Aviation ===
Bangladesh Naval Aviation is the Aviation wing of Bangladesh Navy. At present Bangladesh Naval Aviation is operating two Agusta Westland Helicopters from Italy and two Dornier class Maritime Patrol Aircraft (MPA) from Germany. Bangladesh Naval Aviation wing was established in 2011, when two AgustaWestland AW109 helicopters were accepted into service. Two Dornier Do 228NG maritime patrol aircraft joined the service in 2013.

=== Incidents and accidents ===
- 10 February 1972: A Biman Bangladesh Airlines Douglas DC-3 crashed near Dhaka, while it was performing a training flight, killing all 5 people on board.
- On 28 September 1977: Japan Airlines Flight 472 en route from Mumbai to Tokyo was hijacked by 5 Japanese Red Army terrorists shortly after takeoff, and forced the plane to land at then Zia International Airport. The terrorists' demand of $6 million and release of 6 JRA terrorists from Japanese prison was met by the Japanese Prime Minister. Bangladesh Air Force was deployed to control the situation in the ground and to facilitate negotiations.
- 18 November 1979: A Biman Bangladesh Airlines Fokker F27-200 crashed while performing a test flight. As a part of the test, a stall in landing configuration was performed at 8000 feet. Both engines of the aircraft flamed out and could not be re lit, forcing the crew to land in a field near Savar. The aircraft ran through embankments, causing the nosegear and right main gear to collapse. None of the four people on the flight died in the accident.
- 5 August 1984: Biman Bangladesh Airlines Flight 426, a Fokker F27-600 (registered S2-ABJ) crashed into a marsh near Hazrat Shahjalal International Airport in Dhaka. The aircraft was performing a scheduled domestic passenger flight between Chittagong Patenga Airport, Chittagong and Zia International Airport, Dhaka. The crash was a controlled flight into terrain caused by bad weather.The first officer of the flight was Kaniz Fatema Roksana, well known as the first female commercial pilot of Bangladesh. With a total death toll of 49 people, it is the deadliest aviation disaster to occur on Bangladeshi soil.
- 22 December 1997: Biman Bangladesh Airlines flight BG-609 (from Hazrat Shahjalal International Airport in Dhaka to Osmani International Airport, Sylhet) carrying 85 passengers and 4 crew, operated by a Fokker F28-4000 (registered S2-ACJ), crashed onto a paddy field 5.6 kilometres from the foot of the runway of Osmani International Airport in heavy fog. 17 passengers were injured.
- 27 June 1998: An Air Parabat flight from Ishwardi Airport crash-landed on its belly in a field near Savar due to some technical problems with the aircraft. Five crew and two passengers on board escaped unhurt.
- 27 September 1998: A training flight on a Cessna 150 of Air Parabat Flying Academy crashed, killing two trainee pilots.
- 7 June 2002: A training flight on Cessna-150 (S2-AAM) of Air Parabat Flying Academy crashed due to a heavy storm killing its lone licensed pilot Mukhlesur Rahman Saqueeb (32), steward of Biman Bangladesh Airlines.
- 22 April 2003: A storm in Dhaka damaged three Airbus A310s, a Boeing 737 and a Fokker F-28 aircraft parked at Hazrat Shahjalal International Airport. The storm, strongest in three years, had a wind speed of up to 111-km per hour.
- 11 July 2003: An Air Memphis cargo flight (operated by a Boeing 707, registered 5X-AMW) bound for Queen Alia International Airport, Amman from Hazrat Shahjalal International Airport, Dhaka was forced to abort takeoff for unknown reasons. The aircraft failed to abort takeoff successfully and overran the runway of the airport by 450 meters before the nose gear collapsed and the aircraft came to rest at a marsh. None of the five crew members were killed in the incident.
- 8 October 2004: Biman Bangladesh Airlines flight BG-601 (from Hazrat Shahjalal International Airport in Dhaka to Osmani International Airport, Sylhet) carrying 79 passengers and 4 crew, operated by a Fokker F28-4000, overran the wet runway of Sylhet and ended up in a ditch. Two passengers were injured.
- 8 June 2005: A Bangladeshi fighter trainee pilot of Bangladesh Air Force (BAF) crashed his plane into a neighbourhood on the outskirts of the capital, killing one person and injuring four others. The Chinese-made F-7 plane on a training mission came down at midday on the Uttara residential area. The pilot ejected with minor injuries just 100 yards away from the flaming wreckage. The house onto which the jet had crashed was completely destroyed, while two adjacent houses were partly damaged.
- 1 July 2005: Biman flight BG 048 en route from Dubai skidded off runway 23 onto the grass at Shah Amanat International Airport while landing during heavy rain. The right-hand undercarriage of the McDonnell Douglas DC-10-30 (registered S2-ADN) caught fire and the engine on the right wing separated from the aircraft, sinking into mud. Of the 201 passengers and 10 crew on board, 10 received injuries but there were no fatalities. Investigations found that the wheel-box of the aircraft went out of order. The aircraft was later written-off.
- 25 May 2008: Saudia flight 810, a Boeing 747-300 (registered TF-ARS) leased from Air Atlanta Icelandic caught fire on its no. 3 engine after landing at Zia International Airport in Dhaka from Medina. There were no fatalities among the 307 passengers and 19 crew on board. An investigation determined a fuel leak to be the cause of the fire.
- 10 September 2008: A flight attendant on board Air Arabia flight 522 bound for Shah Amanat International Airport, Chittagong found a note which said there was a bomb on board the aircraft (an Airbus A320). After the aircraft landed in Chittagong, the aircraft was searched but no bomb was found. A passenger on board the flight named Nasir Uddin was found guilty of the hoax, which caused panic among passengers and had grounded the aircraft at Chittagong for two hours.
- 1 March 2012: A fire broke out on the second floor of the terminal building of Shah Amanat International Airport, Chittagong at around 4 pm. No injuries or casualties were reported. Airport fire brigade managed to douse the flame by 6 pm. The fire had severely damaged the second floor of the terminal disabling the two jet bridges forcing airport authorities to bring out the reserve portable ones. Several flights including 4 international ones had to be delayed, grounding several aircraft at the airport and diverting a few other. As many as 2000 passengers had to wait for several hours at the parking lot for their flight.
- 30 April 2012: A Royal Thai Air Force ATR-72-500 aircraft of 1st Air Division/6th Wing, 603sq, (serial L16-2/52, code 60314), sustained damage in a landing accident at Shahjalal International Airport, Dhaka. The aeroplane suffered a runway excursion while landing. It came to rest against a concrete barrier, causing substantial damage to the right hand wing. Two passengers reportedly suffered minor injuries.
- 13 August 2012: United Airways flight 546, an ATR 72–212 registered S2-AFE, was performing a domestic flight en route to Dhaka from Jessore, carrying 10 passengers, when the windshield of the first officer (co-pilot) completely blew out due to high pressure at an altitude of 9000 feet. The captain safely landed the plane at Shahjalal International Airport. The first officer received an eye injury.
- 5 April 2013: A fire broke out in the cargo village of Shahjalal International Airport at around 11:30 am. Ten units of Fire Service and Civil Defence rushed to the spot and doused the fire one-and-a-half-hour later. Flight schedules were unaffected by the fire.
- 25 April 2013: A 2-seater Cessna 152 (S2-ABI), a flight training aircraft of Bangladesh Flying Academy crash landed at Shah Makhdum Airport, while landing in the airport at 4:24 pm. The aircraft flipped upside-down, the flight instructor and trainee pilot inside escaped with minor injuries.
- 28 September 2013: A Boeing 747-400 (leased from Air Atlanta Icelandic), operated by Saudi Arabian Airlines as SV-3822, en route from Riyadh for a Hajj flight, landed in Dhaka when sparks and smoke were observed from the right hand main landing gear during roll out, the aircraft stopped on the runway. The airport was closed for about one hour as result of the emergency.
- 2 November 2013: Air Arabia flight 522, operated by an Airbus A320-200, made an emergency landing at Chittagong due to a bird strike, after leaving for Sharjah. All aboard were unhurt.
- 30 May 2014: Air Arabia flight 524 bound for Sharjah from Chittagong, operated by an Airbus A320-200, suffered from cabin pressurisation problems 45 minutes after taking off. The aircraft returned to Chittagong, making a safe emergency landing. The same aircraft made the flight two hours later, after the problems with the aircraft were fixed.
- 20 July 2014: United Airways Flight 501, an ATR 72–212 registered S2-AFN, was performing a domestic flight en route to Cox's Bazar from Dhaka, carrying 43 passengers and 5 crews, when the nose gear collapsed after safely landing at Cox's Bazar Airport. This caused severe damage to the front fuselage of the aircraft. The airport was shut down for 22 hours until the aircraft was safely removed from the runway.
- 1 April 2015: A Cessna 152 (S2-ADI) aircraft of Bangladesh Flying Academy crashed at Shah Makhdum Airport and got engulfed by fire after the pilot conducted a rejected takeoff, sensing technical problems on the aircraft at around 2 pm. The accident left the trainee pilot Tamanna dead, also leaving the flight instructor with critical burn injuries, who later died.
- 13 May 2015: A Mi-17 helicopter on a training flight belonging to the Bangladesh Air Force crash landed Shah Amanat International Airport, Chittagong and caught fire. All three people on board sustained major injuries and were hospitalised.
- 29 June 2015: A F-7MB aircraft on a training flight belonging to the Bangladesh Air Force that took off from Shah Amanat International Airport, Chittagong crashed into the Bay of Bengal, six miles off Patenga Beach. The pilot of the aircraft, Flight Lieutenant Rumman Tahmid, remains missing despite a large scale search that only turned up debris of the aircraft.
