= Christian Cemetery, Dhaka =

Graveyard in Wari, Dhaka, Bangladesh

Dhaka Christian cemetery
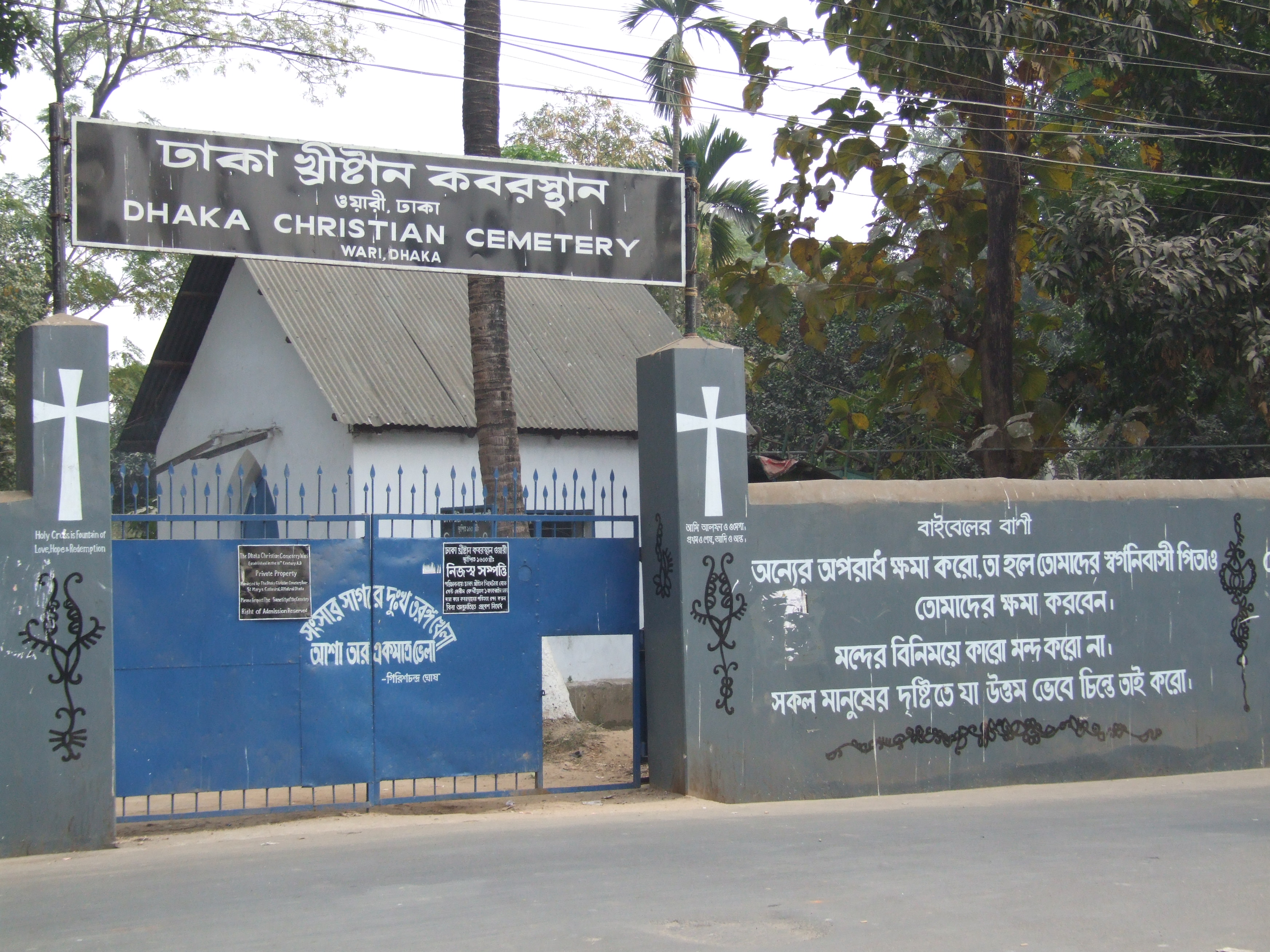
- Entrance to the cemetery on Narinda Road, Wari, Dhaka

Religion
- Affiliation: Christian

Location
- Location: Dhaka, Bangladesh
- Interactive map of Dhaka Christian cemetery
- Coordinates: 23°42′56″N 90°25′11″E

Architecture
- Established: est. 1720

Dhaka (Narinda) Christian cemetery in old town Dhaka

The Dhaka Christian Cemetery (also known as the Narinda Cemetery) is a graveyard situated in Wari, an area of the old town in Dhaka, Bangladesh. It was established by Portuguese traders in the 17th century and is still in use by members of the Dhaka Christian community.

The cemetery contains two designated archaeological sites, the Columbo Sahib mausoleum and the tomb of Reverend Joseph Paget. Many of the oldest graves and mausoleums are in a state of disrepair and are being overtaken by unchecked vegetation growth and lack of maintenance, while other parts of the cemetery still see new burials taking place. It is open daily to visitors.

== Origins ==
There are also reports that Dhaka's first church for the Christian community was established on the site of the cemetery and that priest Sebastian Manrique came to Dhaka between 1624 and 1629 and recorded that there was a church at the location of the cemetery. There are further references to the presence of a church at this location, including from French gem merchant and traveller Jean Baptiste Tavernier who visited Dhaka in 1666, and Niccolò Menucci soon after, both referring to a church at this location. It is assumed that Portuguese Augustinians built the church, and that the present burial ground was originally the burial ground adjacent to the church, commonly referred to as the "church graveyard."

In 1632, ethnic conflict peaked between the Portuguese and other nationalities and most Portuguese settlers, traders and priests were ousted on the orders of Emperor Shah Jahan and they fled to Hooghly. Dhaka locals declared solidarity with the emperor and beat the parish priest, Father Bernardo, to death. It is believed that he is also buried in the cemetery. A list of the Augustinian churches established in Bengal was drawn up in 1789, but the Narinda church was not listed. It is assumed that the church was destroyed sometime between 1713 and 1789, but the cemetery remained in use thereafter.

== Prominent graves and their architectural significance ==
The cemetery has several distinct architectural forms related to mausoleums, grave embellishments and tombstones:

=== The Columbo Sahib mausoleum ===
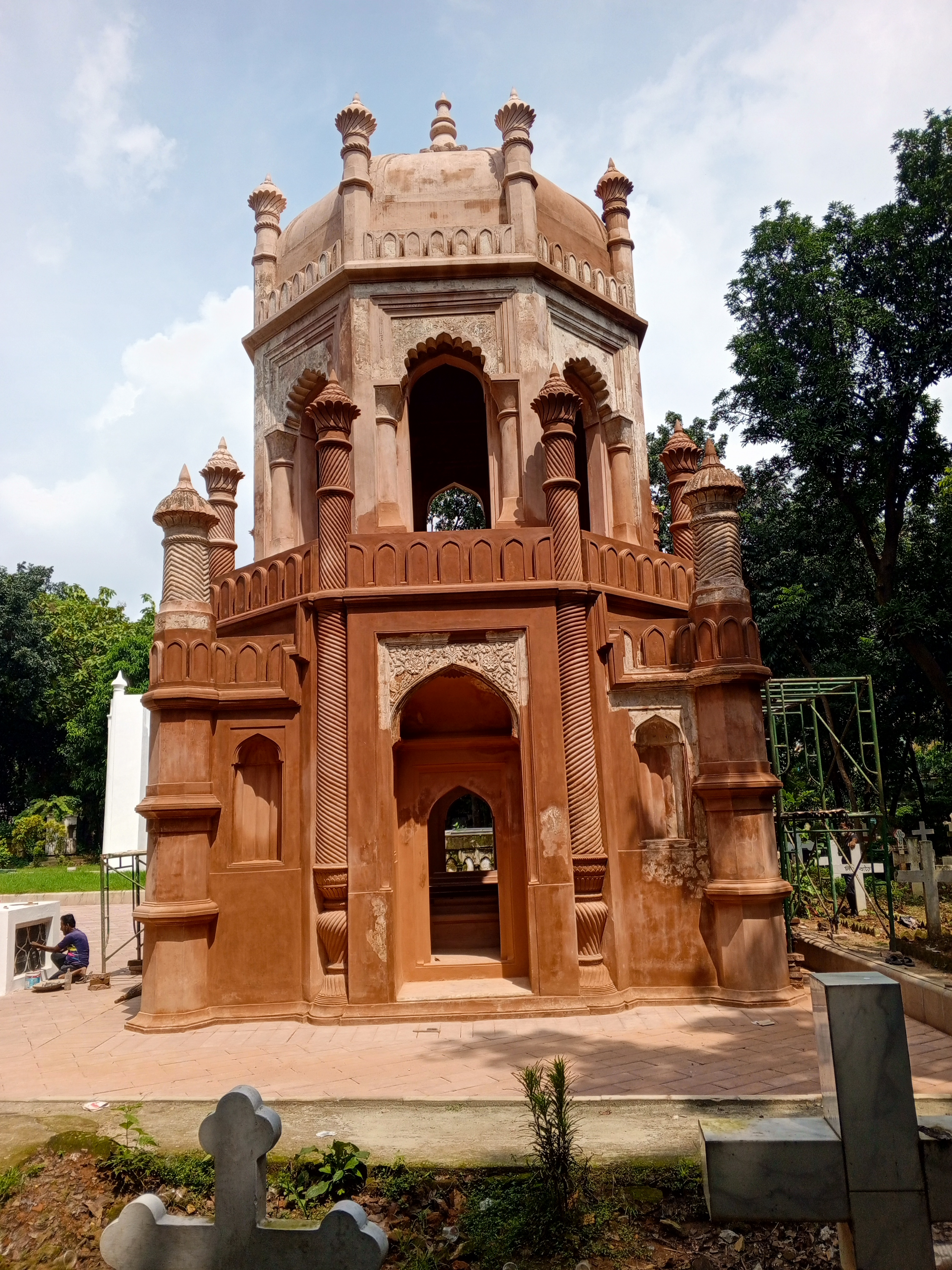
The Columbo Sahib mausoleum under restoration in 2025

The largest structure in the cemetery is a mausoleum containing three graves, all without any inscription. A painting of the mausoleum was completed by the German artist Johann Zoffany in 1786, titled "Nagaphon Ghat" (translated from Bengali it means the Nagaphon mooring or dock), depicting the structure on the Dolai Khal or creek, that has since been filled up and no longer reaches as far as the cemetery.

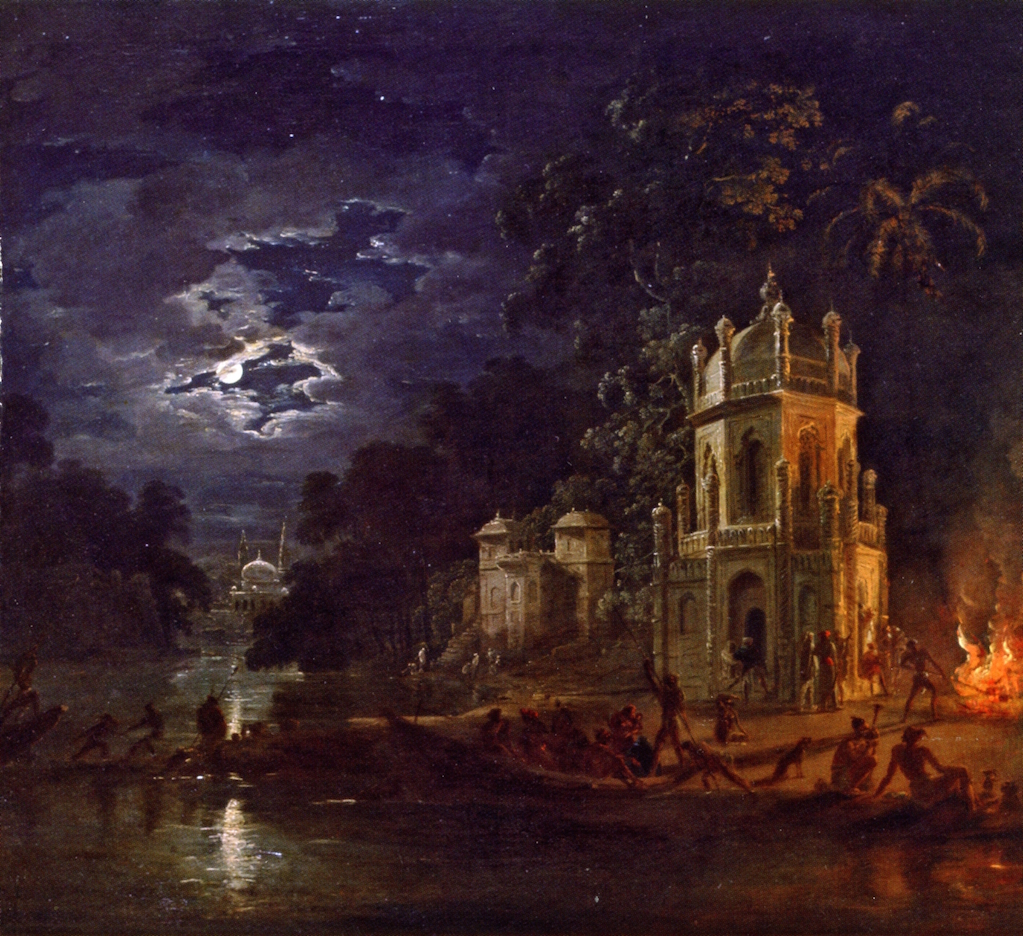
Painting titled Nagaphon Ghat: The Columbo Sahib mausoleum located in the Christian Cemetery as painted by German artist Johann Zoffany in 1786

The structure was first referred to as the Columbo Sahib mausoleum by Reginald Heber, the Bishop of Calcutta in an 1824 account of his visit to Dacca. Heber had consecrated the Narinda cemetery in 1824 and recorded the presence of the large imposing tomb as "....Some of the tombs are very handsome; one more particularly, resembling the buildings raised over the graves of Mussulman saints, has a high octagon gothic tower, with a cupola in the same style, and eight windows with elaborate tracer.. Similarly, Francis Bradley Bradley-Birt records the Columbo Sahib structure as: A high octagonal Gothic tower with eight windows, the whole surmounted by a cupola in the same style, it stands nameless, dominating the whole cemetery and jealously keeping watch over the three graves that lie within. ...Silent and impressive, the towering mausoleum keeps well the secret that it holds.. A 1950 photograph shows that the Mausoleum has declined more disastrously in the last 50 years as compared to the previous 160 years when it was painted by Johann Zoffany in 1786 as the British Royal Court artist.

=== Moorish gateway and Mughal tombs ===
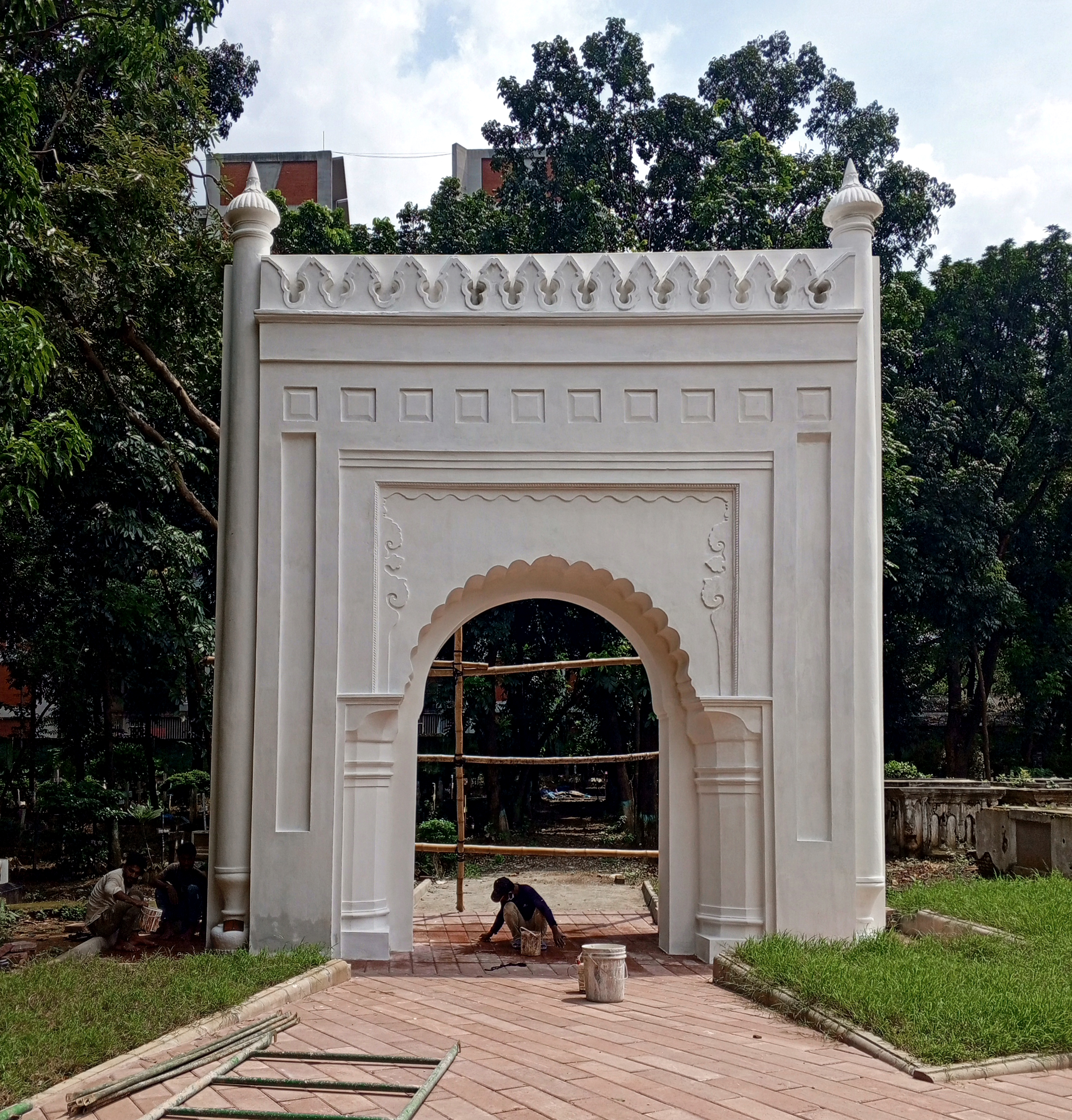
The Moorish arch demarcating the original entrance to the cemetery

The Moorish-type gateway was built during the Mughal period using thin 'jafri bricks' (these are clearly visible where the plaster has fallen off in parts). The gate would previously have led into a specific section of the graveyard, but today its location and purpose are more obscure. Its position also reveals that no formal layout was maintained in the expansion of the cemetery.

Graves adorned with the obelisk and urn, resemble the contemporary best-known English cemeteries in Calcutta; the Baroque character of the older and provincial cemeteries. The Indian version of the pyramid stands on a podium where the inscriptions are laid, has a less broad base, which is smoothly uplifted to an acute angled apex.

=== Mass grave from 1943 Bengal famine ===
The cemetery also contains a mass-grave, demarcated by a low stone fence surrounding a square area, containing the remains of Christians who succumbed to the Bengal famine of 1943. There is no plaque or reference to those interred in this grave.

== Present condition and use ==
The original road layout of the cemetery has faded away with time, but it can be understood that a couple of straight roads intersected to make a path system within the network with the tombs jumbled into a group to form one or two clusters, while making it hardly visible to visitors.

The cemetery expanded its borders in the early 20th century, covering 3 acres (1.2 hectares).

The Dhaka Department of Archaeology has declared the early-18th-century mausoleum of Columbo Sahib and the 1724 tomb of Reverend Joseph Paget as two of the city's 22 heritage sites. This has however not stopped the decay and crumbling of the structures. The cemetery is still in use and burials take place on a regular basis. The cemetery is maintained and managed by the Roman Catholic Metropolitan Archdiocese of Dhaka on behalf of numerous Christian denominations.

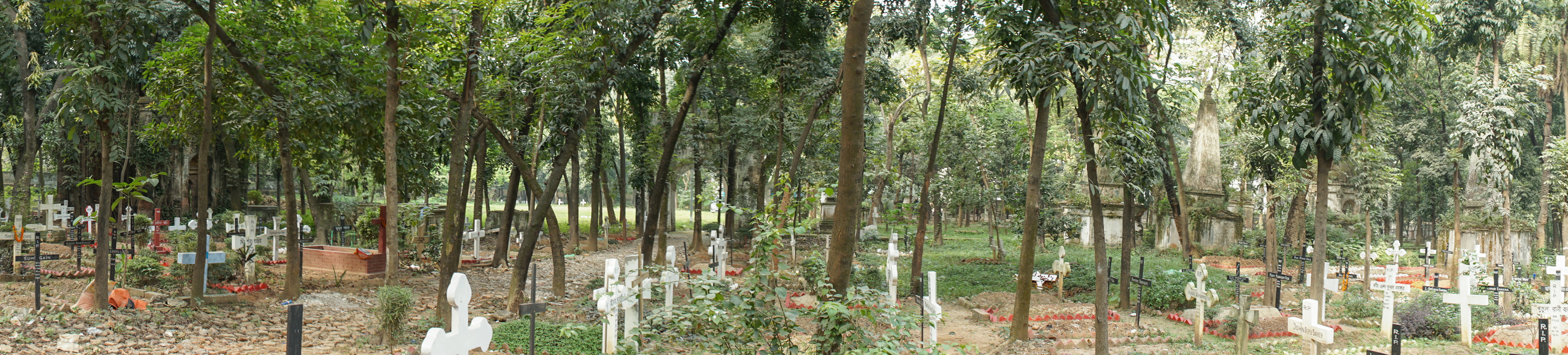
Portions of the cemetery that are still in use, with Mughal tombs in the background right.

== Notable interments ==
- Joseph Padget (1724), Chaplain of Bengal, who died while visiting Dacca from India at the age of twenty-six, on 16 March 1724. His grave is the oldest in the cemetery.
- Columbo Sahib
- Jane Rennell (1774), the infant daughter of James Rennell and Jane Thackarey (who took a silver model of their infant daughter's grave back to England on their departure from Dacca).
- Robert Craufurd (1776), The double tombs of Robert Craufurd (the factor of the East India Company) and his wife, located in the original southern section of the cemetery
- Wonsi Quan (1796), whose gravestone was erected by his friend Wona Chow in 1796, both Chinese converts to Christianity.
- There is a monument to two soldiers killed in the Sepoy Mutiny of 1857 (to the left of the entrance first grave on the path).
- Other military graves hold Henry Smith who died on 22 November 1857, the day of the Rebellion and that of soldiers Neil McMullen and James Moores who died on 23 November 1857. William Esden and Robert Brown were also victims of the mutiny and died on 24 November 1857.
- Joakim G. Nicholas Pogose (1876), Founder of Pogoz School (first private school in Dhaka, established in 1848). He became director of Dhaka Bank established in 1846 and in 1874, Commissioner of Dhaka Municipality.
- Elizabeth David (1878), wife of Marcar David, the "Merchant Prince of Bengal" who died on 18 November 1878. The grave has an exquisite statue of Madonna, reflecting the wealth her family.
- Maj. Gen. Hamilton Vetch (1865), Maj. Gen. of the Bengal Army. He contributed significantly to the jungle war in Assam.
- Jennette Rummary (1892), (also known as "Jennette Van Tassell"). She made the first manned balloon flight and subsequent parachute jump in Bangladesh's history on 16 March 1892 as a member of a travelling American aerial exhibition troop led by Park Van Tassel. The flying troupe was invited to perform in Dhaka by Nawab of Dhaka, advertising that the female pilot would ascend in a balloon and fly over the Ahsan Manzil adjacent to the Buriganga river, and would descend via a parachute She started the balloon flight from the southern bank of the Buriganga but encountered difficulties and strong winds causing her to jump from the balloon. Her parachute became ensnared in a tree in what is today Ramna Park and she was severely injured while being rescued. She died in hospital three days later and was buried in the cemetery. Her grave is unmarked.
- Flt. Lt. Edward N. Owens (1961), pilot of a RAF Gloster Javelin jet aircraft that crashed over the Meghna River on 5 August 1961. The gravestone was refurbished by the Commonwealth War Graves Commission in 2023 after falling into a state of disrepair.

== Gallery ==
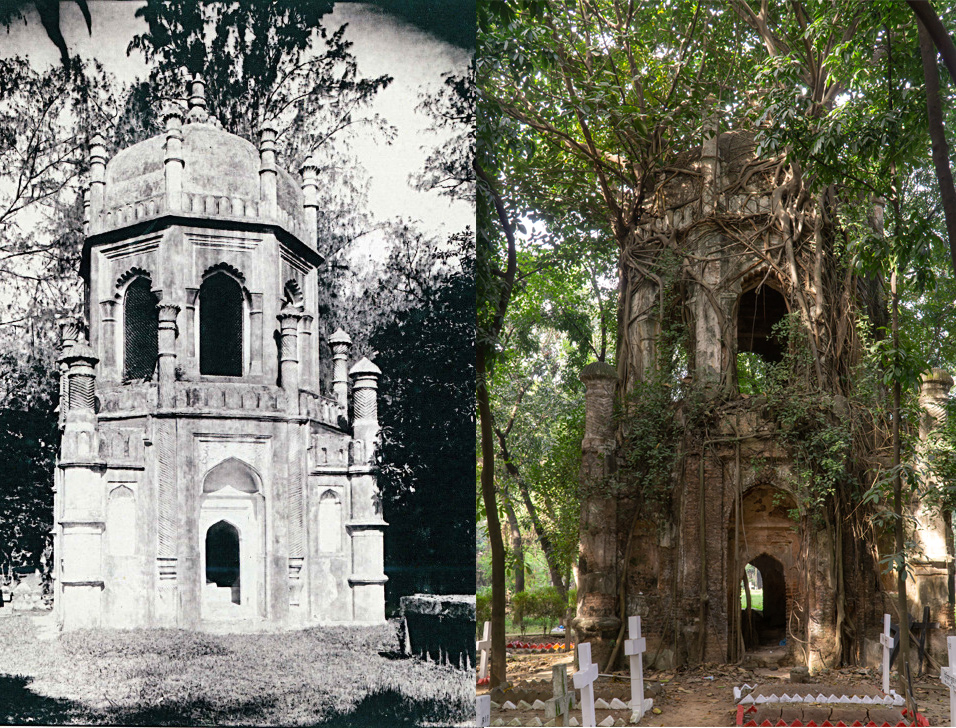
Columbo Sahib mausoleum condition compared between 1950 and 2022. A restoration project started in 2025

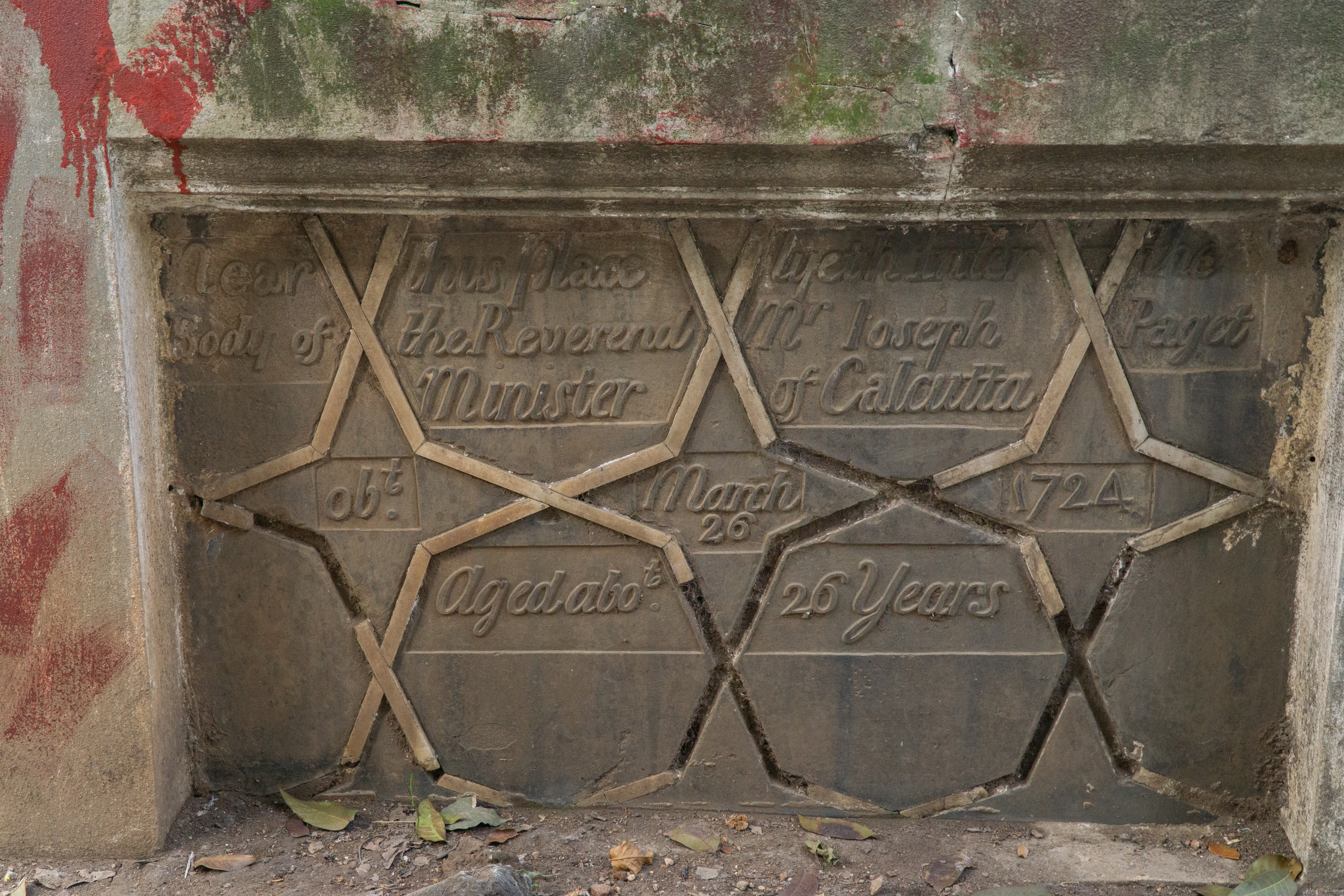
Gravestone Joseph Padget: 1724

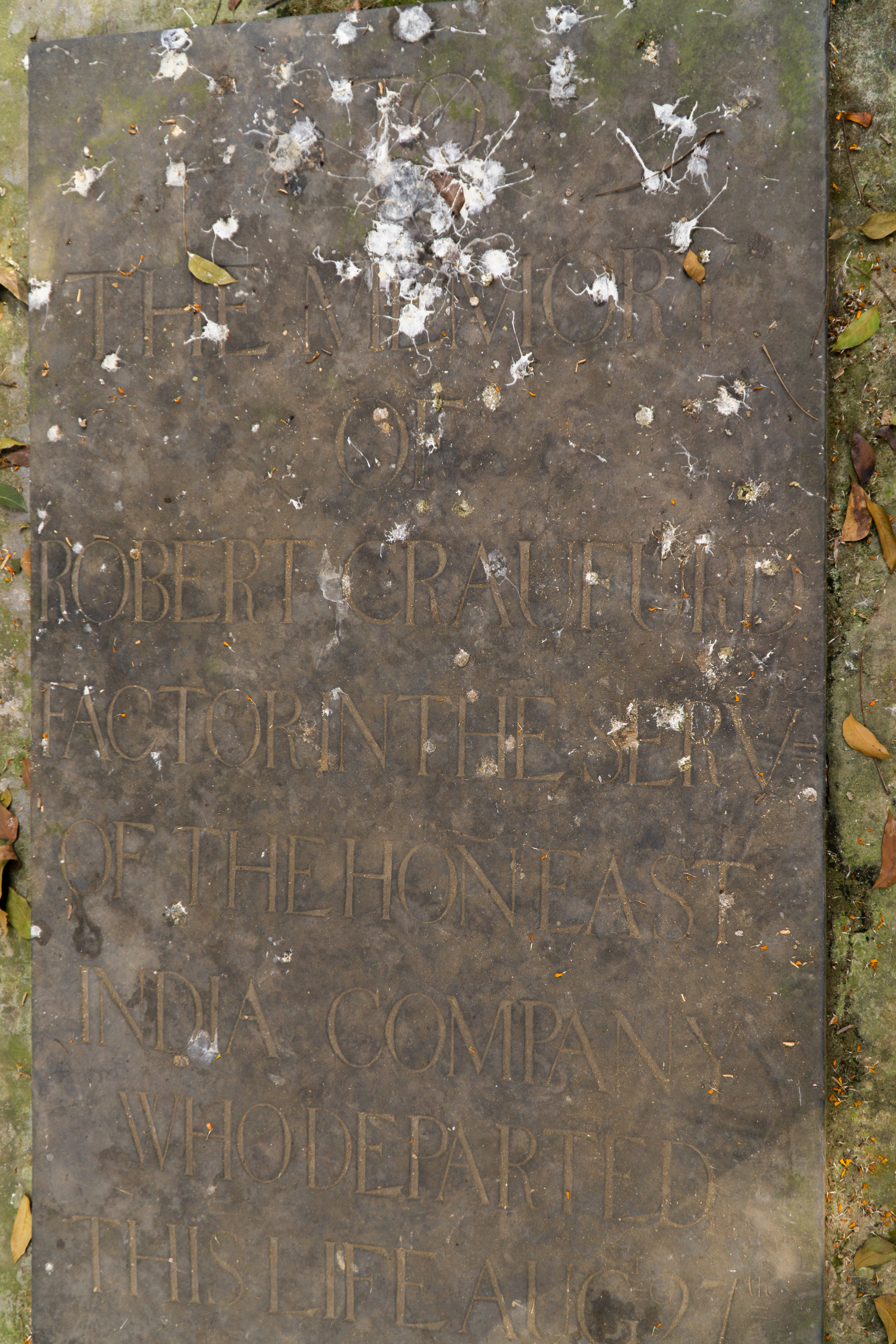
Robert Craufurd tomb inscription: 1797

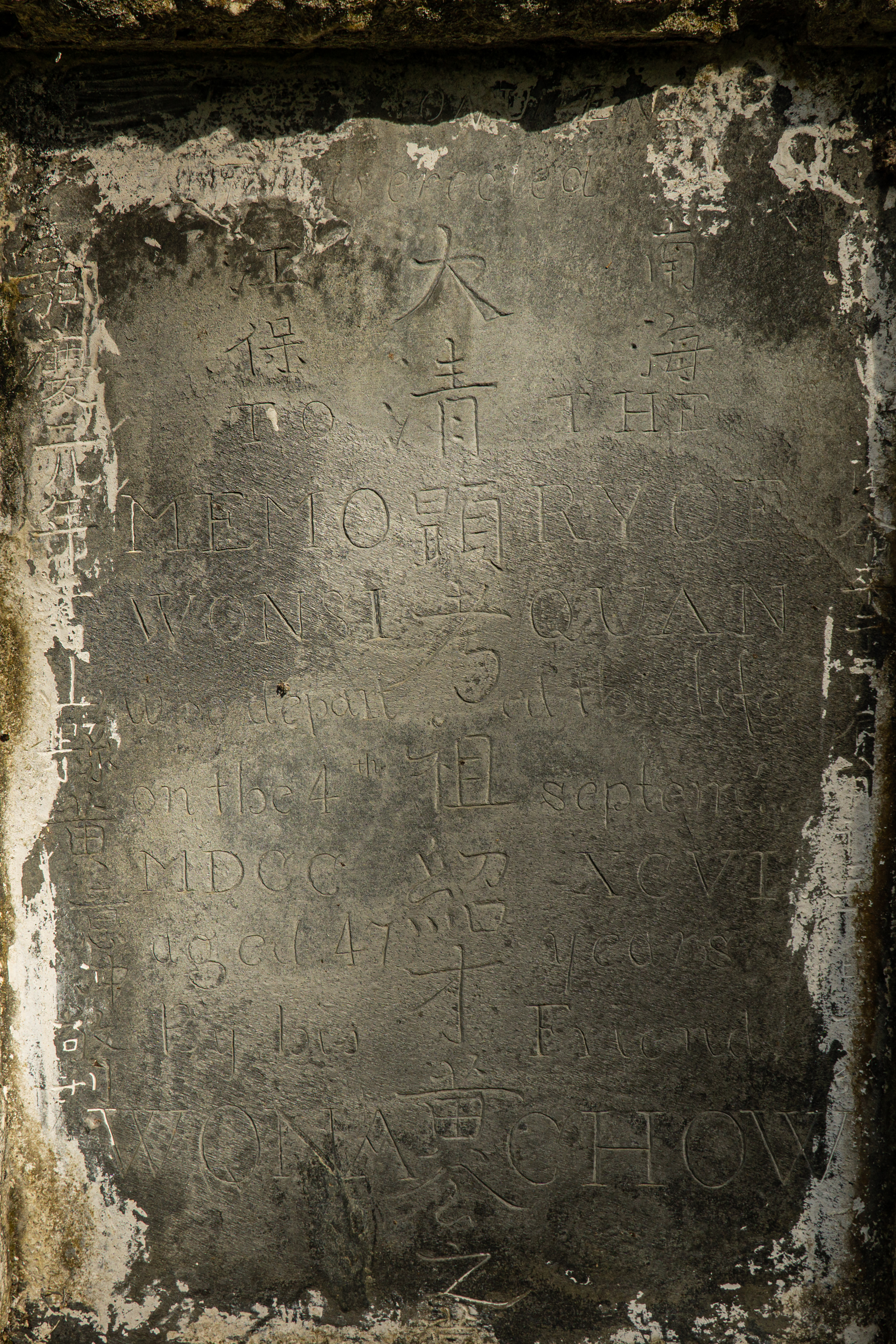
Gravestone inscription for Wonsi Quan of 1796

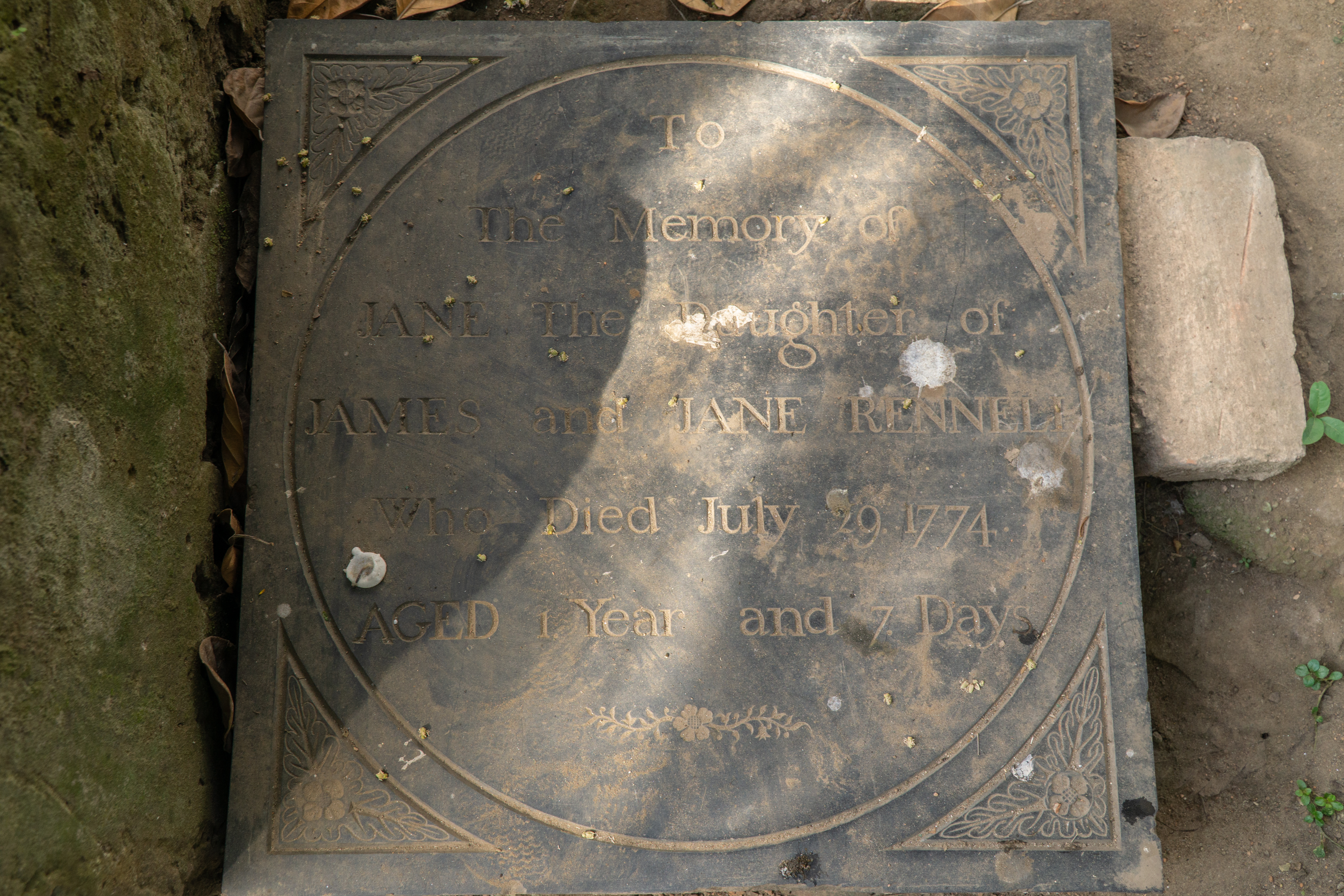
Jane Rennell: 1774

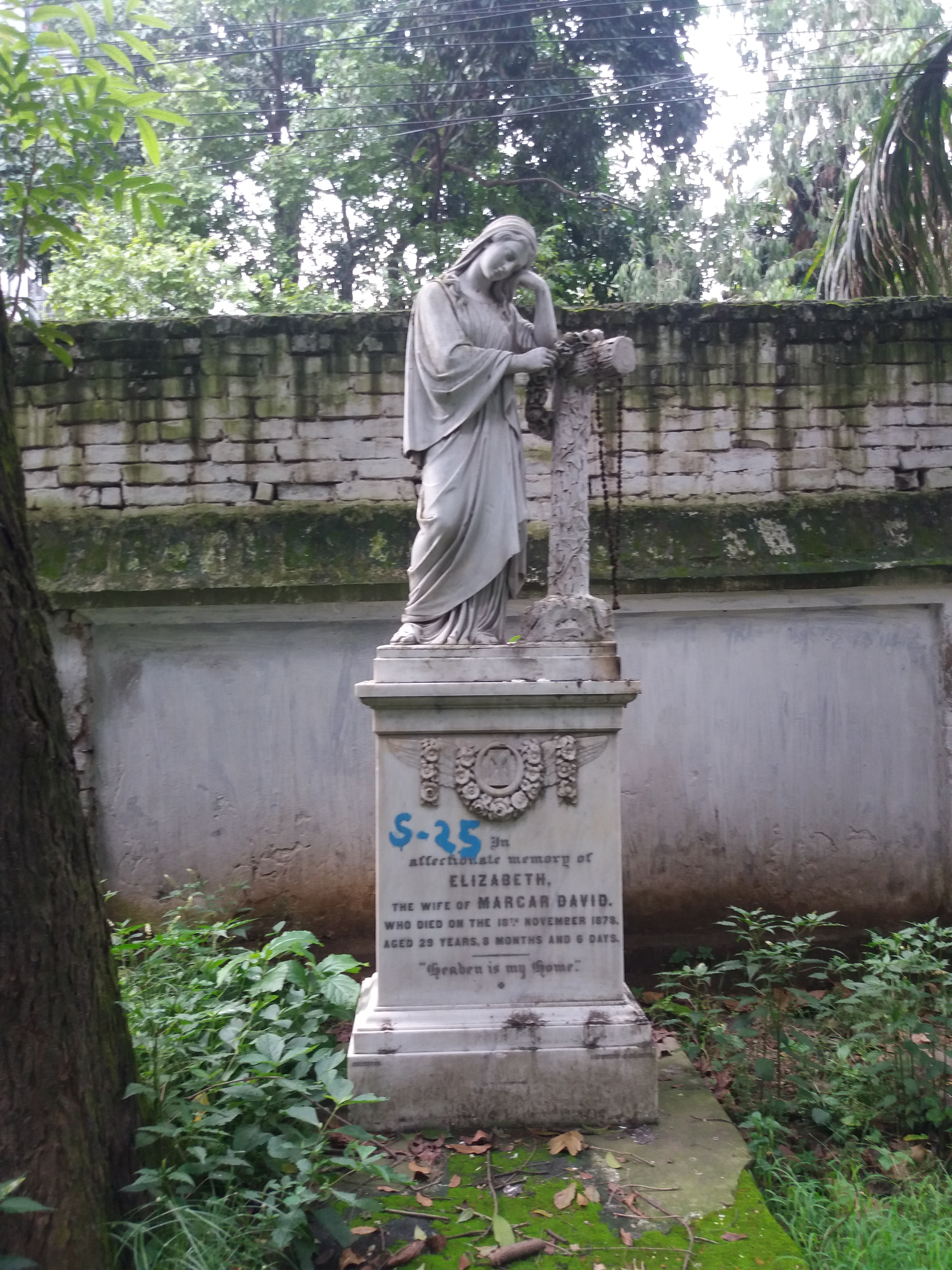
Elizabeth David with the statue of Madonna on the tomb

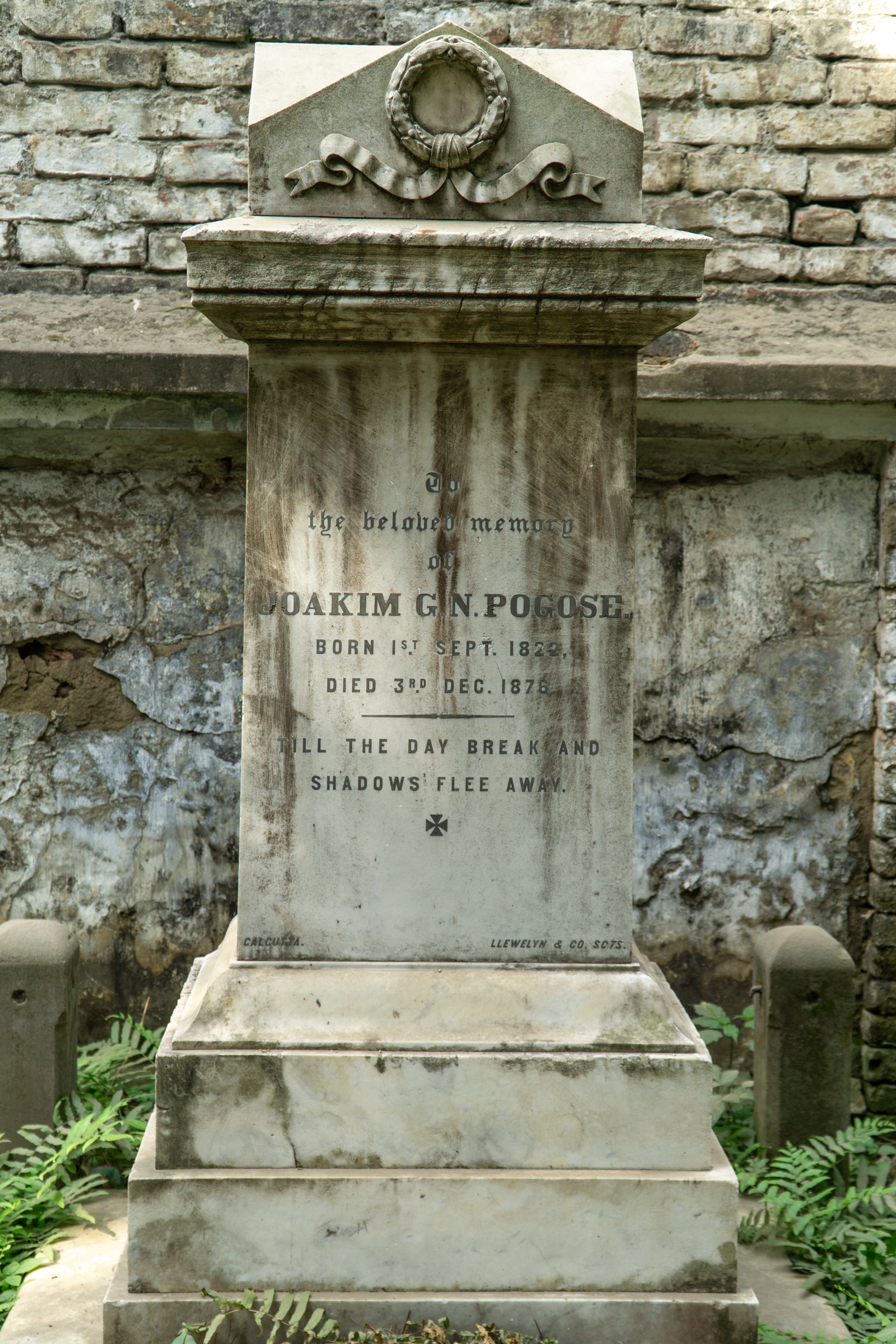
Joakim G. Nicholas Pogose: 1876

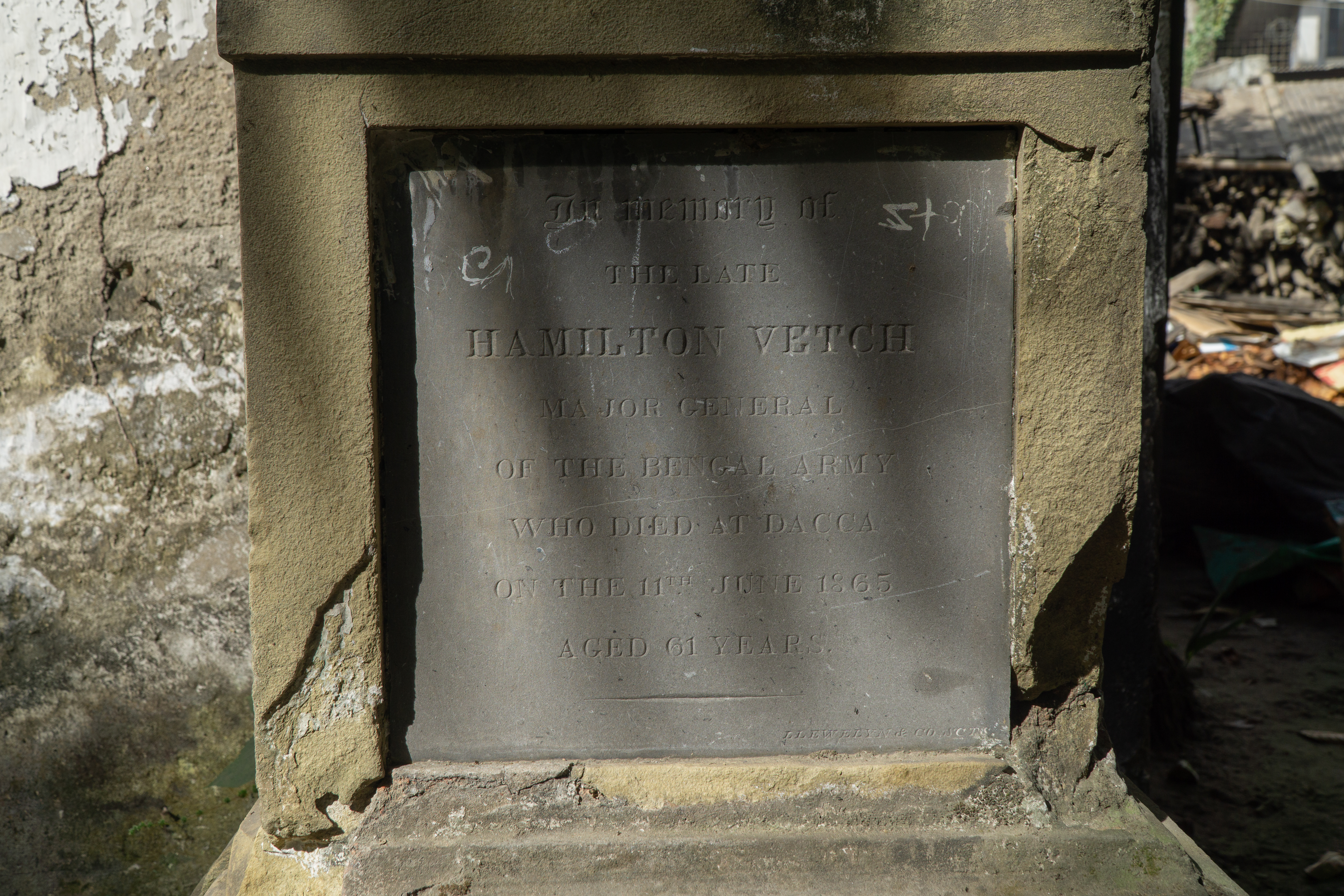
Maj. Gen. Hamilton Vetch: 1865

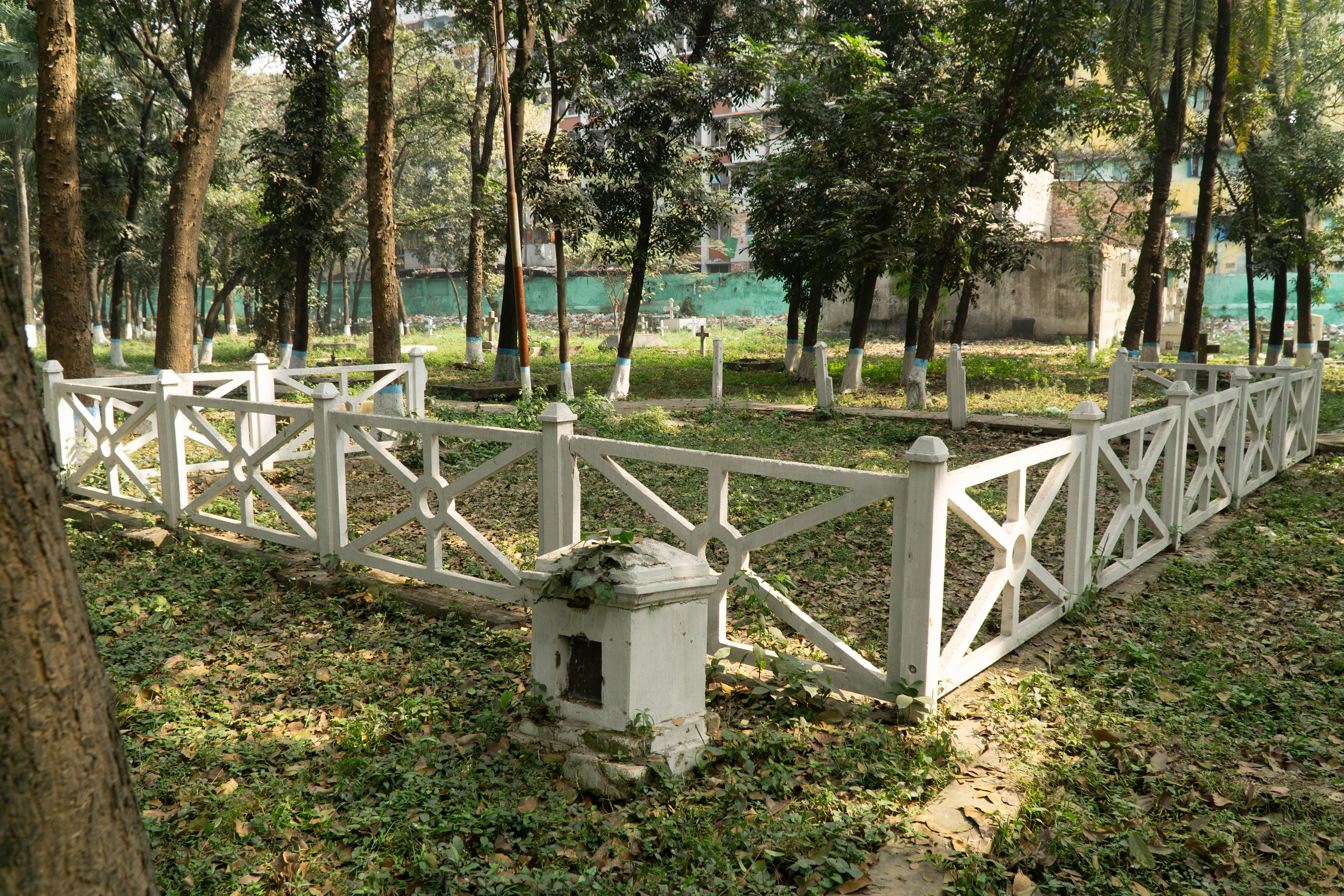
White stone fence demarcates the area of the mass grave from 1943

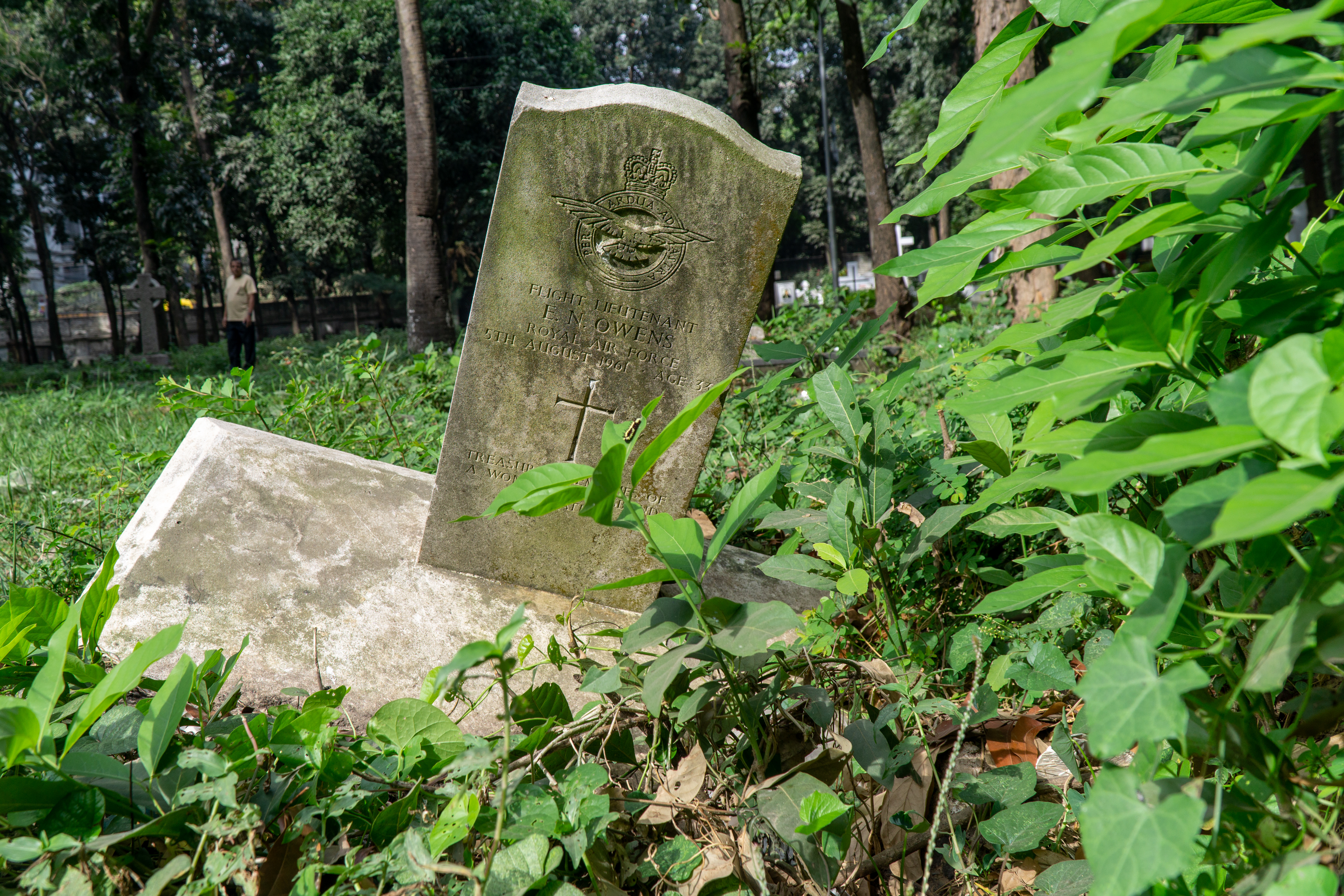
Flt. Lt. Edward N. Owens grave in 2022

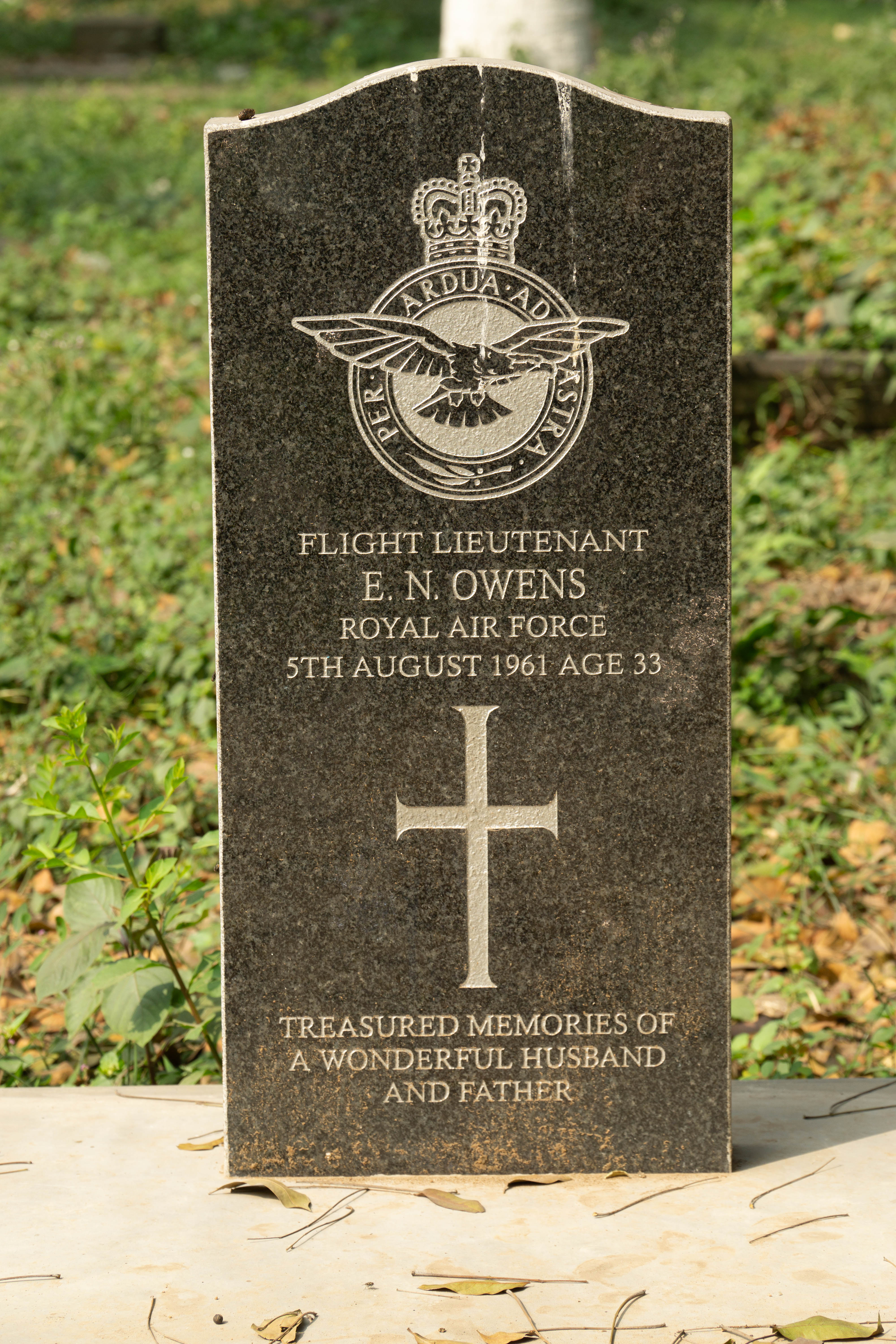
Edward Owens tombstone in 2024.
