= Air Parabat =

Airline of Bangladesh

Air Parabat এয়ার পারাবত
IATA	ICAO	Call sign
—	PBT	PARABAT
- Commenced operations: 1994
- Ceased operations: 2001

Air Parabat (sometimes referred to as Parabat Airlines) was the second private sector airline based in Bangladesh. It was founded in 1994 and dissolved in 2001.

== History ==
Air Parabat was established as Air Parabat Flying Academy on 8 January 1994, by the Karim family and the Karim group of companies, with private funding from the IFCB bank. By the end of 1997, Chairman Abdul Karim Khandker and Managing Director Nadera Alam decided to launch domestic scheduled and charter flight services. In preparation for this expansion, the company increased its staff to 45 employees and acquired two Let L-410 Turbolet aircraft from Air Ostrova for 40 million Taka (~£520,000) each. One of these (registration S2-ADD) was involved in a crash and written off, while the other (registration S2-ADC at the time, now 5Y-VVL) was sold to Bluebird Aviation on 1 March 2001, and has currently been in storage since 1 October 2009.

Revenue flights commenced on 11 January 1998 with flights to Barisal, Chittagong, Jessore, Rajshahi, and Sylhet. The airline's maiden flights went to Jessore and Rajshahi, with the inaugural Jessore flight carrying 13 passengers on the outbound leg and 11 on the return, while the Rajshahi service departed full and returned with eight passengers. In early June of that year, one of Air Parabat's aircraft became inoperative at Cox's Bazaar. Then, on 27 June, the second aircraft suffered irreparable damage. As a result, the airline was left without operational aircraft and had to temporarily suspend its operations to secure replacements.

The aircraft that had been grounded at Cox's Bazaar was sent for repairs at the Let factory, leading to substantial financial losses for Air Parabat over the subsequent six months. By mid-December, two upgraded Let-410 aircraft were delivered to Dhaka, allowing Air Parabat to resume its services. Air Parabat restarted its thrice-weekly roundtrip flights from Dhaka to Cox's Bazaar via Chittagong on 27 December.

As 1999 commenced, Air Parabat had a workforce of 40 employees. The airline further expanded its fleet in January by acquiring a third L-410 aircraft. As of November 2001, Air Parabat was recorded as having ceased operations, and before this was conducting 56 flights per week, achieving an average passenger load of 80-85%, equating to carrying approximately 1,294 passengers weekly.

== Accidents and incidents ==
On 27 June 1998, a Let L-410UVP-E operated by Air Parabat (registration S2-ADD) was conducting a scheduled passenger flight from Ishwardi to Dhaka when it suffered an engine failure during approach. While descending toward Dhaka-Tejgaon Airport, the aircraft's right engine failed at an altitude of 4,000 ft. The crew managed to restart the engine, but soon shut it down again after the turbine temperature rose abnormally. They were then unable to feather the propeller, which caused significant drag and a rapid loss of altitude. The captain carried out an emergency landing in an open field, during which the landing gear collapsed and the aircraft was damaged beyond repair. All seven occupants (five crew members and two passengers) escaped without injury.

On 27 September 1998, A training flight on a single-engine Cessna 150 operated by Parabat Flying Academy crashed onto a rooftop of a warehouse at Postogola in Dhaka, following an electrical malfunction amid gusty winds and heavy rain, leaving its pilot and co-pilot dead.

On 7 June 2002, a single-engine Cessna 150 operated by Parabat Flying Academy (registration S2-AAM) crashed into a playground in Uttara Model Town, Dhaka, killing the pilot on impact. The aircraft had departed from Hazrat Shahjalal International Airport (then known as Zia International Airport) on a solo training flight but encountered adverse weather conditions shortly after takeoff. About three minutes into the flight, communication with air traffic control was lost after the pilot reported that he was unable to see the runway. The aircraft subsequently went down around one kilometre from the airport and caught fire on impact. No one on the ground was injured.

== See also ==
- List of defunct airlines of Bangladesh
