= United Airways =

Bangladeshi airline

United Airways (BD) Ltd. ইউনাইটেড এয়ারওয়েজ

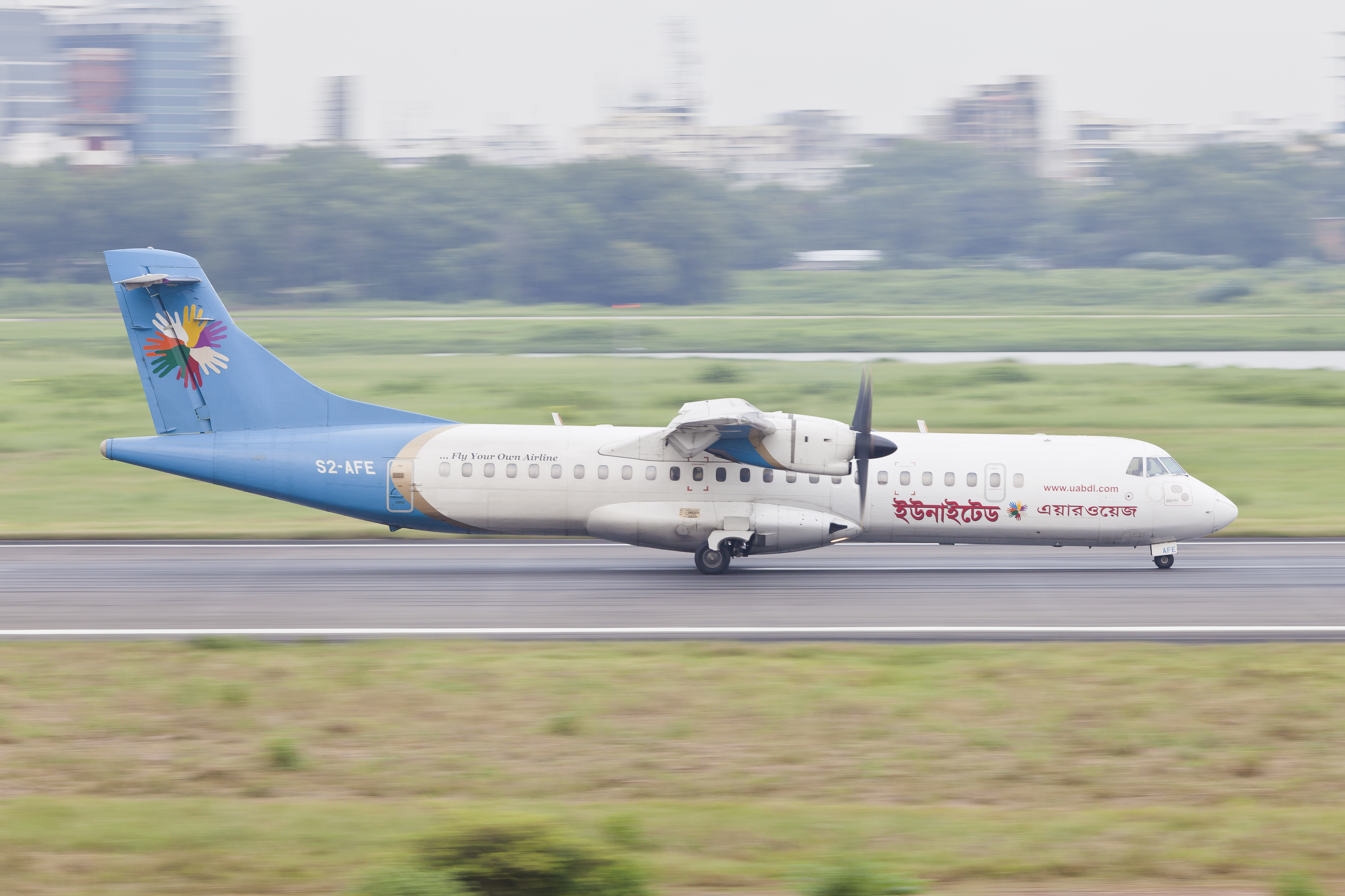
- An ATR 72-200 of United Airways
IATA	ICAO	Call sign
4H	UBD	UNITED BANGLADESH
- Founded: 28 June 2005; 21 years ago
- Commenced operations: 10 July 2007; 19 years ago
- Ceased operations: 6 March 2016; 10 years ago
- Hubs: Shahjalal International Airport
- Secondary hubs: Shah Amanat International Airport Osmani International Airport
- Fleet size: 11
- Destinations: 12
- Parent company: TAC Aviations
- Headquarters: 1, Jasimuddin Avenue, Uttara Tower, Uttara, Dhaka-1230, Bangladesh
- Employees: 1,000 (2014)
- Website: uabdl.com

United Airways (BD) Ltd. (DSE: UNITEDAIR, CSE: UNITEDAIR ), operated as United Airways (Bengali: ইউনাইটেড এয়ারওয়েজ), was a Bangladeshi airline headquartered in Uttara, Dhaka. It operated flights from its main hub at Shahjalal International Airport in Dhaka and secondary hub at Shah Amanat International Airport in Chittagong. It was founded in 2005 and began flights on 10 July 2007 with a Bombardier Dash 8–100, purchased from Island Air. United Airways was the first listed company in the aviation sector of Bangladesh; it became listed in July 2010.

The airline was often criticised for their poor service due to frequent delays, flight suspensions and poor in-flight amenities. In September 2014, the airline temporarily suspended its operations for three days following a conflict among its board of directors and a financial crisis. The airline ceased all operations on 6 March 2016, after a previous gap in service from mid-January to 24 February of that year.

== History ==
United Airways (Bangladesh) Limited, was founded by Captain Tasbirul Ahmed Choudhury, a British-Bangladeshi businessmen from the Sylhet region of Bangladesh, along with few businessman and entrepreneurs in 2005. It obtained the Air Transport Operating License (ATOL) from Civil Aviation Authority, Bangladesh on 28 June 2005. The airline started operating scheduled domestic flights on 10 July 2007, its maiden flights being Dhaka—Sylhet and Dhaka—Chittagong, with a Bombardier Dash 8–100, purchased from Island Air. After few months, domestic flights to Cox's Bazar, Jessore, and Barisal started, along with international service to Kolkata from Dhaka and Chittagong. Another Dash 8-100 was delivered in 2008.

In 2009, the airline received a McDonnell Douglas MD-83 aircraft, and launched flights to London, Dubai, Kuala Lumpur and Kathmandu.

In 2010, it commenced flights to Jeddah, and launched the lucrative Sylhet-London flight with an Airbus A310-300, while an ATR 72–200 and McDonnell Douglas MD-83 were delivered. In 2011, it added a McDonnell Douglas MD-83, another Airbus A310-300 and an ATR 72–200. Flights to Bangkok started and the carrier launched the route Dhaka-Rajshahi-Saidpur. In 2012, it began flights to Muscat from Dhaka and Chittagong, restarted the Chittagong-Kolkata flight, and it also resumed flights to Bangkok.

In 2013, it added two McDonnell Douglas MD-83 and an ATR 72–200. It launched flights to Singapore and domestic flights to Ishwardi.

In 2014, the carrier launched flights to Doha in May. The airline was scheduled to commence flights to Karachi

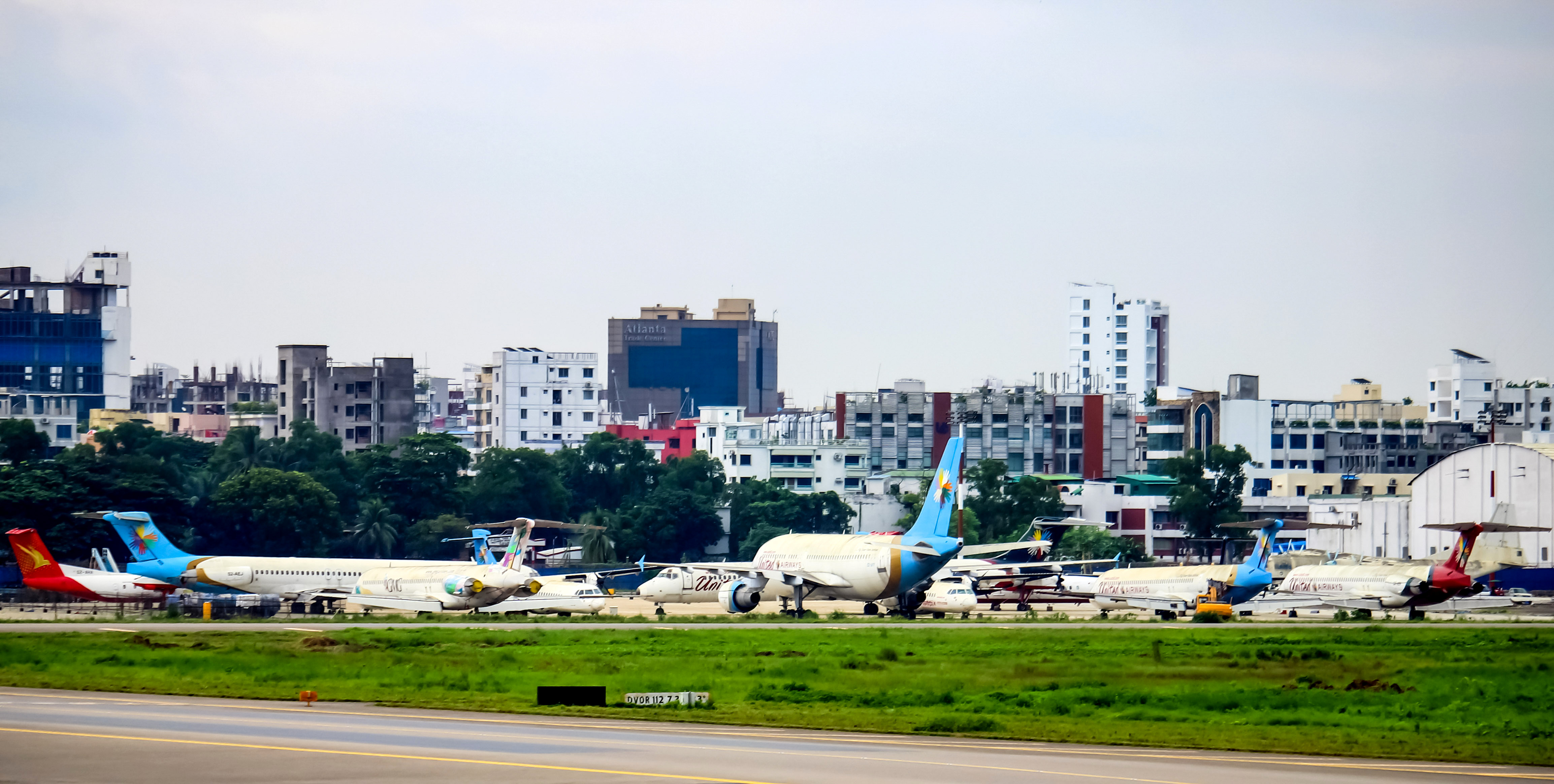
Abandoned United Airways aircraft at Shahjalal International Airport in 2020

On 24 September 2014 evening, United Airways temporarily suspended all domestic and international flights. A conflict of interest among board members was the reason for the short suspension. The day before the suspension, the resignation of Tasbirul Ahmed Choudhury, the chairman and managing director was announced by the airline; following that the board was reshuffled and temporary chairman and managing director were appointed. More than two thousand passengers were stranded in Bangladesh and abroad because of flight cancellations; international flights to Doha, Muscat and Kuala Lumpur from Dhaka did not leave. The suspension also affected the investors of the listed company, as stock prices fell by 7.63 percent at Dhaka Stock Exchange. However, on 27 September, three days after the suspension, the carrier resumed operations with a domestic flight following a consensus among board members.

The airline ceased all operations on 6 March 2016. As of that date, all nine of its aircraft were reportedly grounded for technical reasons. Bangladesh Securities and Exchange Commission in its letter dated 28 February 2021 suspended previous board of directors and appointed a new board of directors with 8 independent directors. The new board took over the charges on 4 March 2021.

== Controversies ==
In June 2011, a court in London had ordered United Airways to repaint its fleet and change its name in the UK after a legal action was taken by American carrier United Airlines. Lawyers for United Airlines said that United Airways had "illegally violated" its trademark and "wrongly associated its services with" those of the American airline. The problem arose when United Airways had services to London Gatwick Airport, which may have confused passengers flying with United Airlines.

In November 2012, United Airways was alleged of inflating its FY 2012–13 first-quarter earnings. The Securities and Exchange Commission later formed a panel to look into its irregularities. Earlier in an investigation, the Dhaka Stock Exchange found anomalies in preparing financial statements by United Airways. It also detected a manipulative trading pattern by an individual investor to create artificial demand for the airline shares. The carrier falsified its first quarter earnings' report to show positive earnings per share. United Airways later admitted that it did not show deferred tax in its financial statement.

In April 2014, CAAB threatened to suspend the carrier's operations due to outstanding aeronautical and non-aeronautical fees of around BDT 770 million. The regulator also imposed a ban on sale or purchase of aircraft by United Airways until it clears all current and outstanding charges in the next one year. CAAB also criticised the airline for not making payments on-time in the past. Following an order from the High Court, CAAB temporarily renewed the airline's AOC.

== Destinations ==
United Airways served the following destinations (as of August 2015): The airline ceased all its domestic and international operations in 2016.

Country	City	Airport	Notes	Refs
Bangladesh	Barisal	Barisal Airport	Terminated	
Bangladesh	Chittagong	Shah Amanat International Airport	Secondary hub	
Bangladesh	Cox's Bazar	Cox's Bazar Airport	Terminated	
Bangladesh	Dhaka	Shahjalal International Airport	Hub	
Bangladesh	Ishwardi	Ishwardi Airport	Terminated	
Bangladesh	Jessore	Jessore Airport	Terminated	
Bangladesh	Rajshahi	Shah Makhdum Airport	Terminated	
Bangladesh	Saidpur	Saidpur Airport	Terminated	
Bangladesh	Sylhet	Osmani International Airport	Terminated	
India	Kolkata	Netaji Subhash Chandra Bose International Airport	Terminated	
Malaysia	Kuala Lumpur	Kuala Lumpur International Airport	Terminated	
Nepal	Kathmandu	Tribhuvan International Airport	Terminated	
Oman	Muscat	Muscat International Airport	Terminated	
Pakistan	Karachi	Jinnah International Airport	Terminated	
Qatar	Doha	Hamad International Airport	Terminated	
Thailand	Bangkok	Suvarnabhumi Airport	Terminated	
Saudi Arabia	Jeddah	King Abdulaziz International Airport	Terminated	
Saudi Arabia	Medina	Prince Mohammad Bin Abdulaziz International Airport	Terminated	
Singapore	Singapore	Singapore Changi Airport	Terminated	
United Arab Emirates	Dubai	Dubai International Airport	Terminated	
United Kingdom	London	Gatwick Airport	Terminated	

== Fleet ==
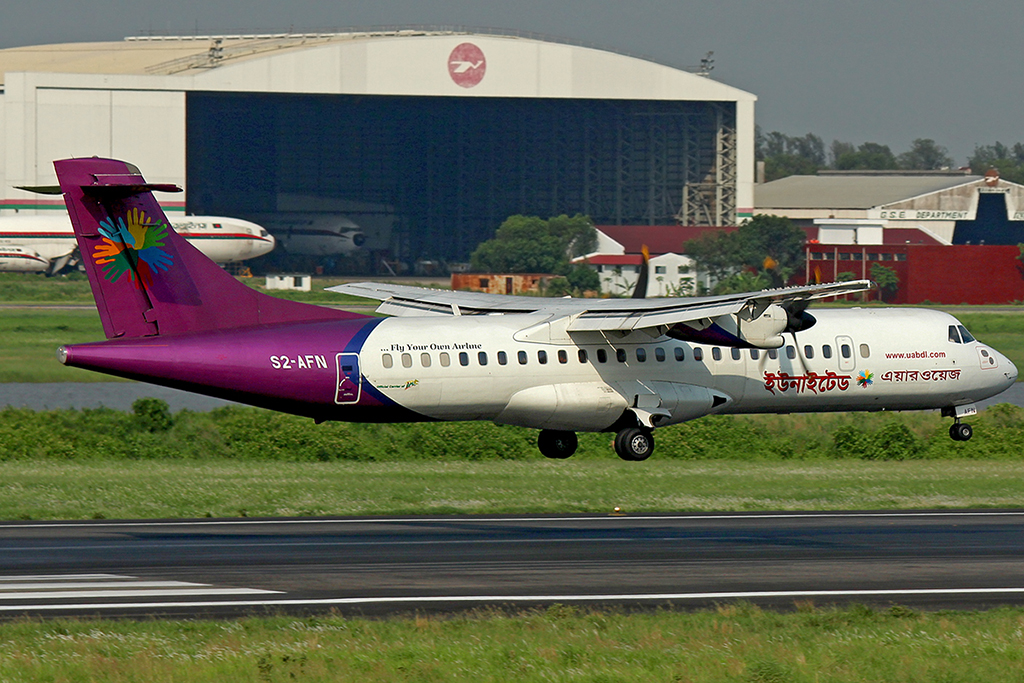
United Airways ATR 72-200

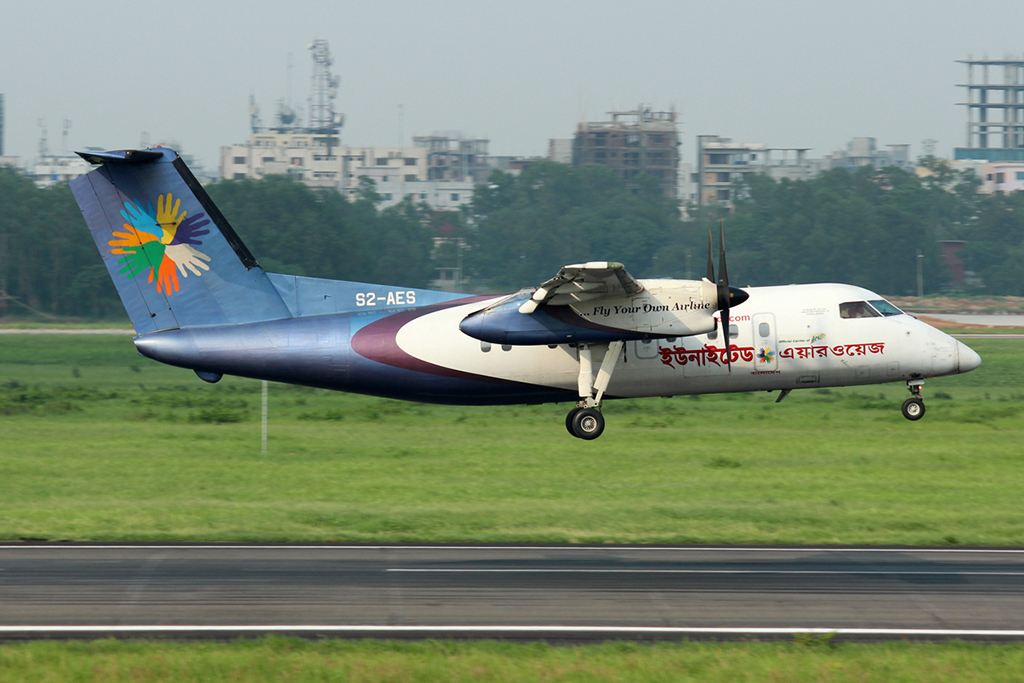
United Airways Bombardier Dash 8–100

As of September 2016, the United Airways fleet consisted of the following aircraft:

United Airways fleet
Aircraft	In service	Orders	Passengers	Notes
Airbus A310-300	2	—	250	
ATR 72-200	3	—	66	
Bombardier Dash 8–100	1	—	37	
McDonnell Douglas MD-83	5	—	170	
Total	11	—		

== In-flight amenities ==
United Airways operated all economy cabin seats in all of its aircraft. In-flight meals were provided on international flights, whereas juices and confectioneries were provided on domestic flights. None of its aircraft were equipped with in-flight entertainment. It had an in-flight magazine called Welcome Bangladesh.

== Accidents and incidents ==
- 13 August 2012: Flight 546, an ATR 72–212 registered S2-AFE, was performing a domestic flight en route to Dhaka from Jessore, carrying 10 passengers, when the windshield of the first officer (co-pilot) completely blew out due to high pressure at an altitude of 9000 feet. The captain safely landed the plane at Shahjalal International Airport. The first officer received an eye injury.
- 20 July 2014: Flight 501, an ATR 72–212 registered S2-AFN, was performing a domestic flight en route to Cox's Bazar from Dhaka, carrying 43 passengers and 5 crews, when the nose gear collapsed after safely landing at Cox's Bazar Airport. This caused severe damage to the front fuselage of the aircraft. The airport was shut down for 22 hours until the aircraft was safely evacuated from the runway.
- 11 August 2014: Flight 584, an MD-83, performing an international flight en route to Dhaka, Bangladesh from Muscat, Oman, carrying 148 passengers, narrowly averted a mid-air collision with a Saudi Arabian Airlines Boeing 747 cargo aircraft while flying over Kolkata airspace in India due to a mistake by an air traffic controller from Kolkata Air Traffic Control. The MD-83 was at a cruising altitude of about 33,000 feet when ATC asked the aircraft to descend to 29,000 feet. While descending, at an altitude of 32,000 feet, the aircraft's TCAS warned the pilots of an imminent collision with the nearby aircraft. The captain of the United Airways aircraft, claimed he was in "visual distance" with the Saudia 747. He followed procedures and ascended to 33,000 feet to avoid the collision.
- 7 August 2015: Flight 585, an MD-83 registered S2-AEI, was performing an international flight en route to Muscat, Oman from Dhaka, Bangladesh, carrying 173 passengers, had to make an emergency landing at Raipur Airport in Chhattisgarh, India due to an engine failure in air. The aircraft landed safely and everyone on board were unhurt. The aircraft, although repaired, could not fly out of Raipur before United ceased operations. As of March 2021, the aircraft is still sitting at Raipur Airport.
