= Hamilton Vetch =

British officer of the Bengal Army (1804-1865)

Hamilton Vetch (1804–1865) was a British officer of the Bengal Army of the East India Company, who reached the rank of major-general. He was active as a political agent in Upper Assam. The alternative spelling Veitch of his family name was also used.

== Military career ==
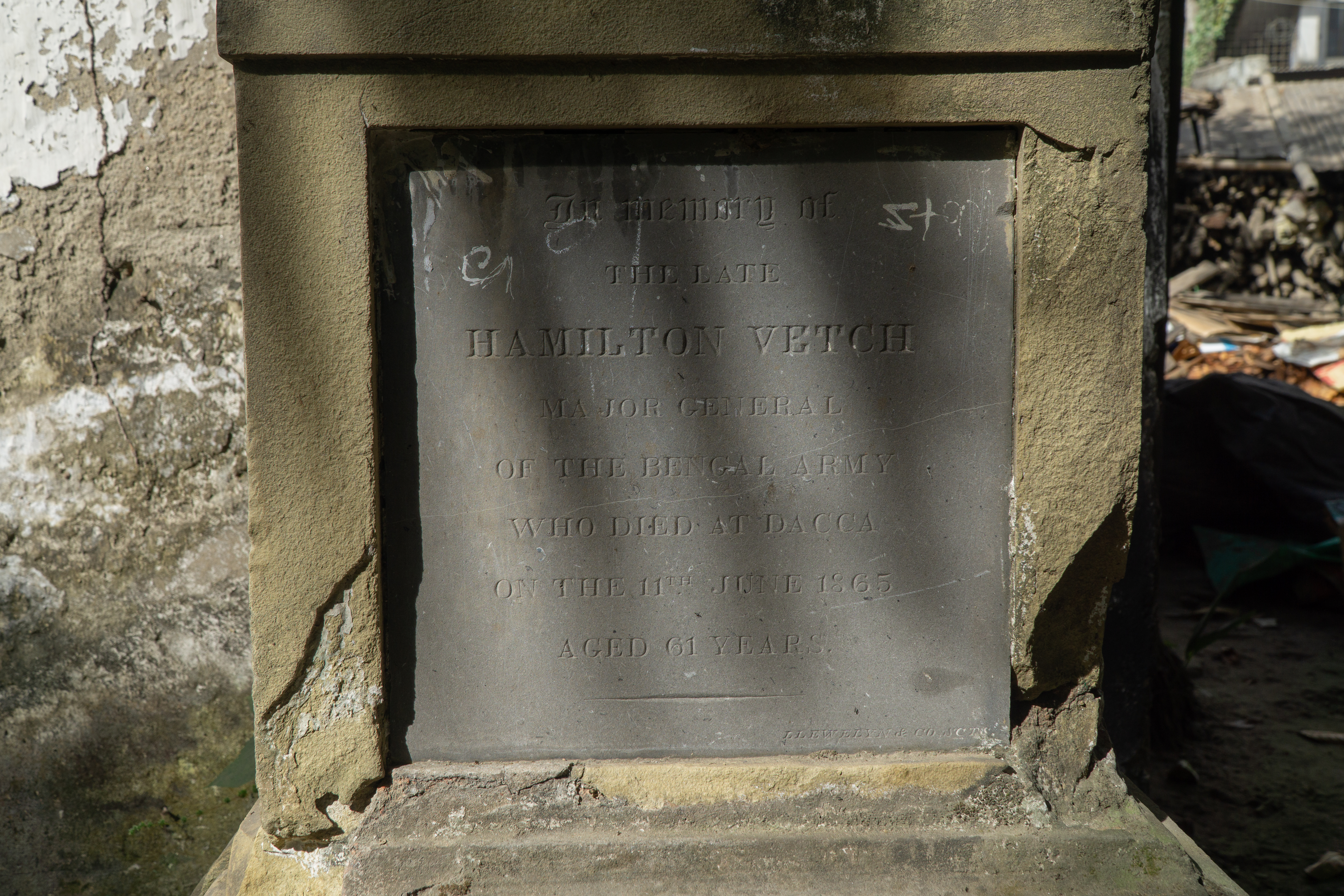
Tombstone inscription: Maj. Gen. Hamilton Vetch: 1865

He was a younger brother of James Vetch, born in Haddington. In 1822 he became an East India Company cadet. He became an ensign in 1823, at Fort William, in the 23rd Regiment of the Native Infantry. He served in the First Anglo-Burmese War, under Captain William Hayes, after transfer into the 2nd Grenadier Battalion. He was promoted lieutenant in 1825. By this point, the 23rd Regiment had been renamed as the 54th.

Vetch then served in the Anglo-Khasi War of 1829–1833 under David Scott, occupying Nongkhlaw in the western Khasi Hills. Captain Lister advanced from Sylhet. Vetch brought up the 43rd Assam Light Infantry in a decisive encounter, and proceeded to destroy villages.

Joining the Assam Sebundy Corps under Lieutenant Matthews in 1836, Vetch was in action against the Bhutia in a dispute over the dooars, where he captured a standard in action against the "Dewangiri rajah", at Soobung Kottah. He was made brevet-captain in 1838, and the rank was confirmed in 1842. In 1839, following the death of Adam White, he formally annexed the Matak rajya enclave. In 1841, he was Principal Assistant, political agent for eastern Assam, and serving with the 54th Bengal Native Infantry. He took over at Dibrugarh, the site for the military station in Lakhimpur district that he selected in 1838–40, towards the end of 1842. He required the forcible resettlement of a group of Khamti people in the district, to land north of Sadiya, and a similar resettlement of Singpho people, at the end of 1843. It was in accordance with a policy of moving hill peoples to the east.

In 1846 Vetch and other officers explored and reported on the old Bhismaknagar hill fort. In 1848 Vetch went on a campaign in the Abor Hills against the Adi people (known then as Abors). He had been in negotiations with local leaders in 1847 on gold washing, but subsequently resorted to an expedition to free some Bodo–Kachari people who had been detained while engaged in it. He was attacked, and burned an Adi village in retaliation.

== Economic affairs ==
With Commissioner Francis Jenkins, Vetch took an interest in the economic possibilities of the Brahmaputra Valley in Assam. There were deposits of coal and gold. There were clearly other resources in Assam, and a wide interest in improving its land communications. In 1842 Vetch was elected to the Agricultural and Horticultural Society of India.

In 1851 Vetch wrote to Jenkins in general terms about difficulties experienced by those attempting gold washing on the Dibang River, a tributary of the Brahmaputra. The decision of the Bengal administration had been to farm out the gold rights. He was keen to see tea cultivation, and opium subject to tax.

Andrew John Moffatt Mills was asked to by the Marquess of Dalhousie to make a tour of districts in north-east Bengal in 1853, and Vetch, now ranked major and Assam's deputy commissioner, contributed to his report on Assam. He commented positively on the replacement of the paik system of the Ahom kingdom by tenancy. He advocated strongly to Mills for support of investment in tea, in line with the policy by then adopted by Jenkins. The report as published in 1854 contained an appendix by Vetch on the revenue system in Assam.

Vetch gave extended evidence on the economy of Assam to a House of Lords committee in March 1859, as a lieutenant-colonel. He also answered questions on the political situation concerning Kandarpeswar Singha, grandson of Purandar Singha.

== From 1857 ==
On his own account, Vetch left Assam in 1857, suffering from dysentery. In Haddington and in Edinburgh that year he encountered Jane Welsh Carlyle, whom he had known and admired in his school days. He was promoted to the rank of major-general in 1862.

Hamilton Vetch died at Dacca on 11 June 1865. Jane Carlyle wrote on 15 August:

He had gone out again for "just one year, to settle his affairs."

A formal notice in the London Gazette gave as an East Lothian residence Huntingdon, which may be Huntington House, Haddington. He left estates in Bengal that were divided between his three children, with half going to his son Hamilton, the remainder being divided equally between Robert and Agnes.

== Family ==
In 1842 Vetch married Louisa Colebrooke Campbell (died 1852), daughter of Colin Campbell, surgeon-general in Bengal. Their daughter Agnes (born 1845), the first child, married Wladislaw (Ladislaw) Ścibor-Rylski in 1870, in Bayonne or Biarritz — he was in business in Lucerne. Their daughter Rosalie Ścibor-Rylska is known as the lover of Paul Claudel, and mother of his daughter Louise. She married Francis Vetch (1862–1944), a second cousin on the Vetch side.

There were also two sons of Hamilton and Louisa, Hamilton the younger (1848–c.1900) and (Robert) Francis. Robert Francis Vetch married in 1870 Eliza Allen Harding, daughter of Walter Harding, Chief Justice of Natal. A lieutenant of the 20th Foot, he was dismissed from the army in 1875. In 1883, he was working as a transport manager for the International Association of the Congo, opening up new territory. Of the National African Company, he died in Lagos in 1887 aged 38.
