= Tejgaon Airport =

Military airport in Dhaka, Bangladesh

BAF Base Bashar বিএএফ ঘাঁটি বাশার

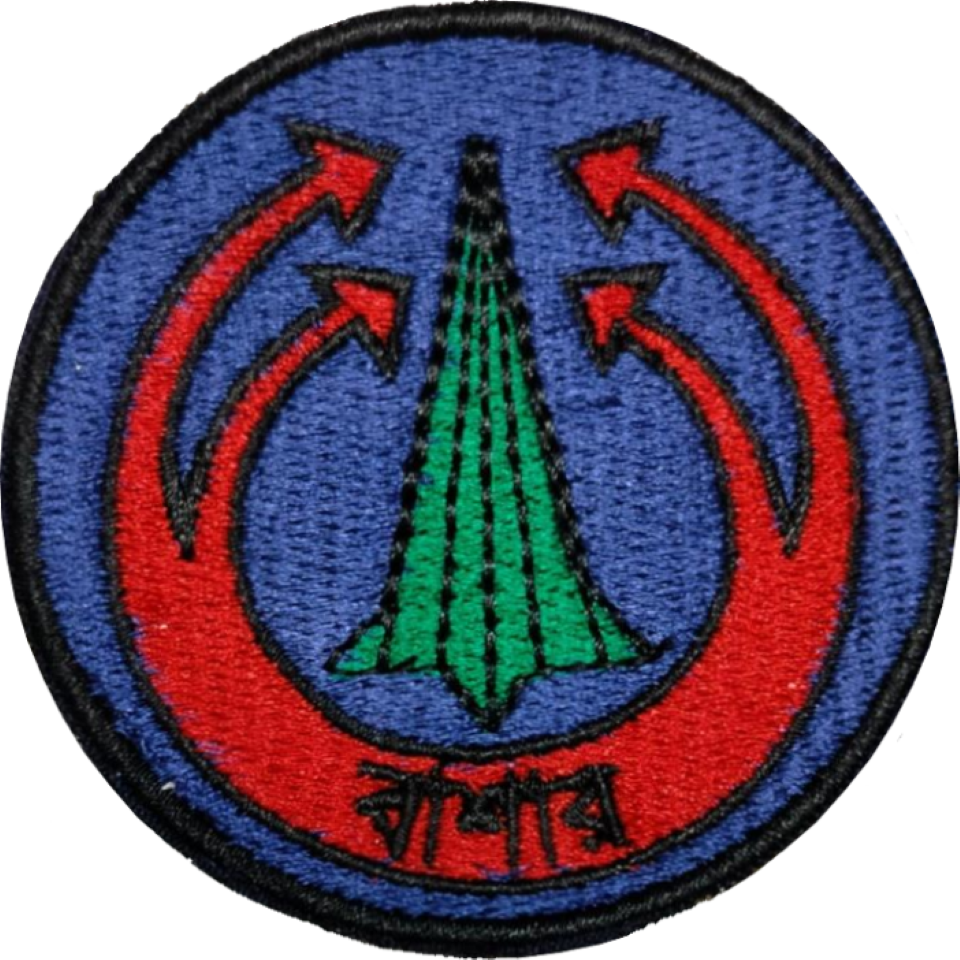

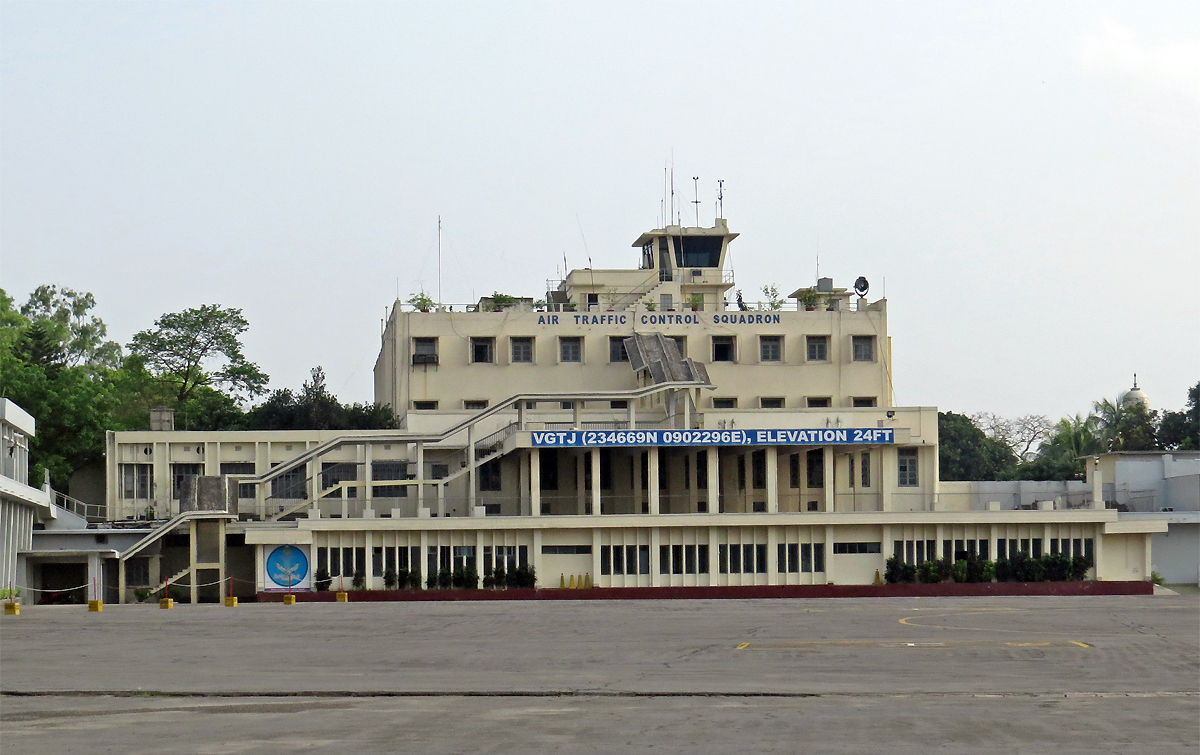
- IATA: none; ICAO: VGTJ

Summary
- Airport type: Military
- Operator: Bangladesh Air Force
- Location: Tejgaon, Dhaka, Bangladesh
- Elevation AMSL: 24 ft (7.3 m)
- Coordinates: 23°46′43″N 090°22′57″E

Map
- Location of airport in Bangladesh

Runways
Direction	Length		Surface
Direction	ft	m	Surface
17/35	9,315	2,839	Asphalt

BAF Base Bashar (ICAO: VGTJ), also known as Tejgaon Airport, is a military air base of Bangladesh Air Force in Dhaka, Bangladesh. Bangladesh Army also uses this military base. It is also the National Parade Square of Bangladesh. It served as the country's sole international airport prior to the construction of Hazrat Shahjalal International Airport in 1980.

== History ==
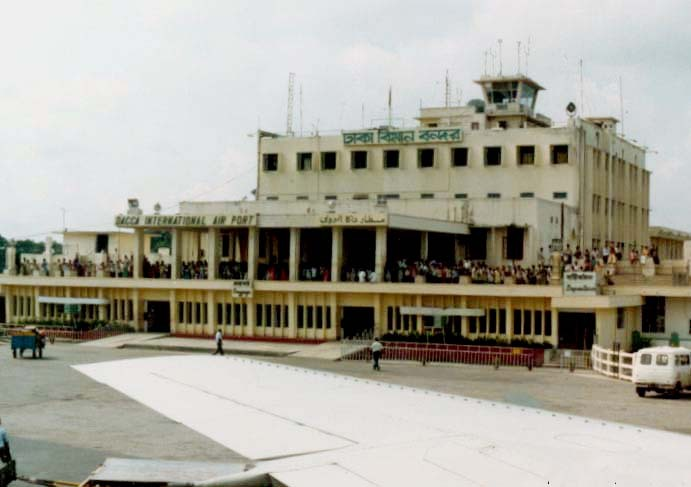
Tejgaon Airport

The British had built military airstrips at Tejgaon, Dhaka during the Second World War for operating warplanes for the Battle of Kohima and other Burmese war threats. The construction of Tejgaon Airport at Dainodda started in 1941; and the building of a landing strip at Kurmitola (Balurghat) started at about the same time. The airstrips at Tejgaon and Kurmitola had military fighter plane landing facilities and the British Royal Air Force used the airstrips for maintenance and storage of aircraft. There was also a United States Air Force detachment here during the war. The first Royal Indian Air Force light fighter landed on the under‑construction runway of Tejgaon in the beginning of 1943.

After the Partition of British India in 1947, Tejgaon Airport became the first airport to operate civil aviation in the then-East Pakistan and it was also a station of the Pakistan Air Force. A number of other British-built military airstrips in Bangladeshi territory were also converted into civil airports – some during the East Pakistan period and others after independence of Bangladesh. A few were converted to STOL (Short Take-off and Landing) ports, and the rest are currently abandoned. The airstrips not yet converted to any civil airport of any kind are at Feni, Rajendrapur, Pahar Kanchanpur, Chakaria and Rasulpur. On 1 March 1954, the No. 14 Squadron PAF was assigned to PAF Station Dacca and was the only Pakistani squadron in East Pakistan during the Indo-Pakistani war of 1971.

Following the transfer of civilian flights to the newly built Shahjalal International Airport in 1981, Tejgaon was taken under the control of the Bangladesh Air Force's Base Bashar.

In mid-2011, the Bangladesh Air Force raised objections to a proposed 19-metre high metro rail along Bijoy Sarani, arguing that the metro rail would hinder military air operations from the Tejgaon airstrip, it made a plea that the airfield be kept functional. The BAF also recommended an alternative route along Khamarbari-Farmgate which would affect the Jatiya Sangsad Bhaban complex. The prime minister opted for the realignment of the route along the parliament complex in line with the BAF suggestion, a move which drew huge flak from different technical experts. The experts, including architects, planners and civic activists, termed the BAF stance unfounded on many occasions and strongly argued that the metro rail would not affect the present operations of the airfield. The airstrip hasn't been used since 1988 and it is seriously affecting Dhaka city's development.

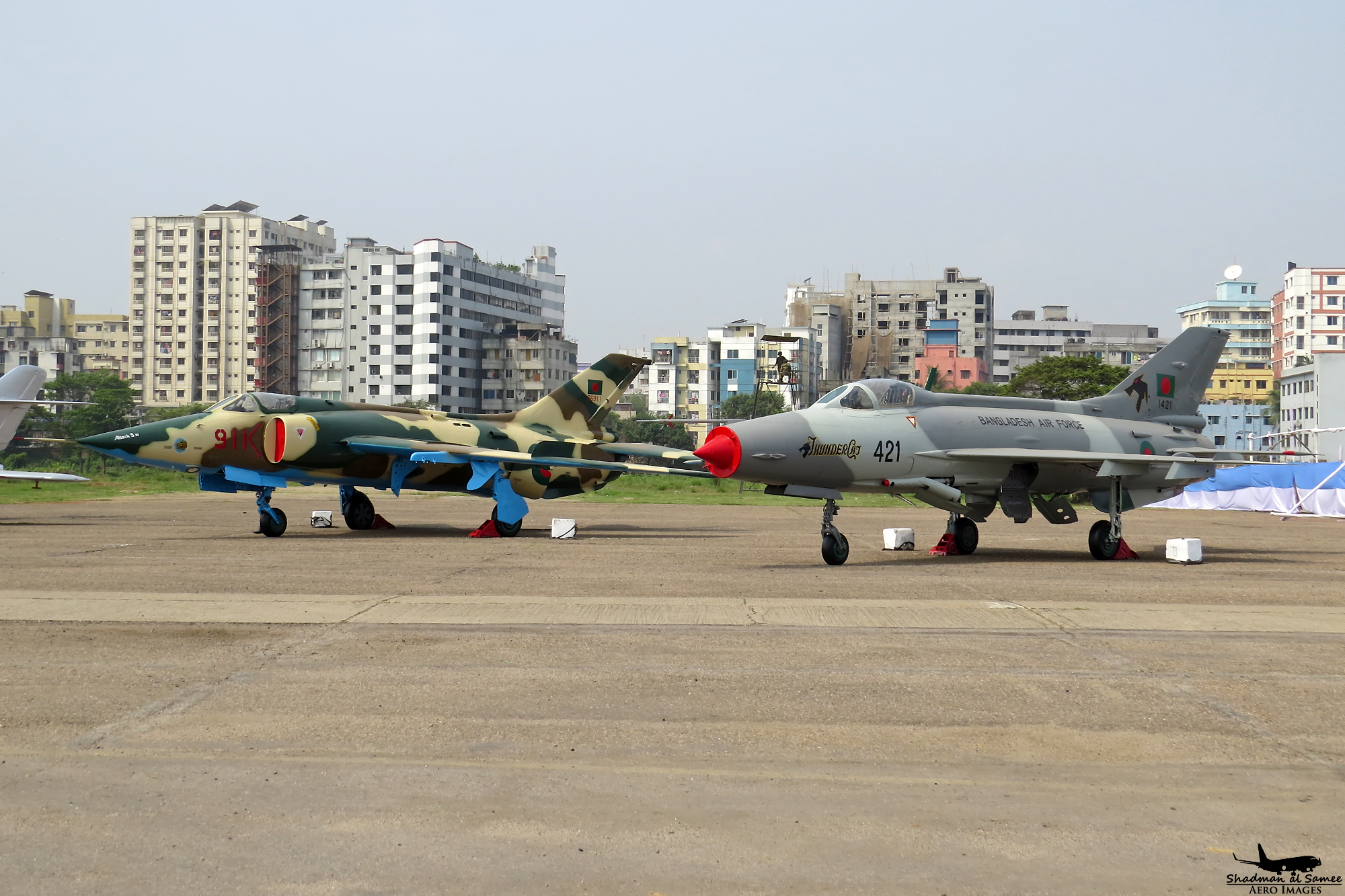
BAF Aircraft at this base

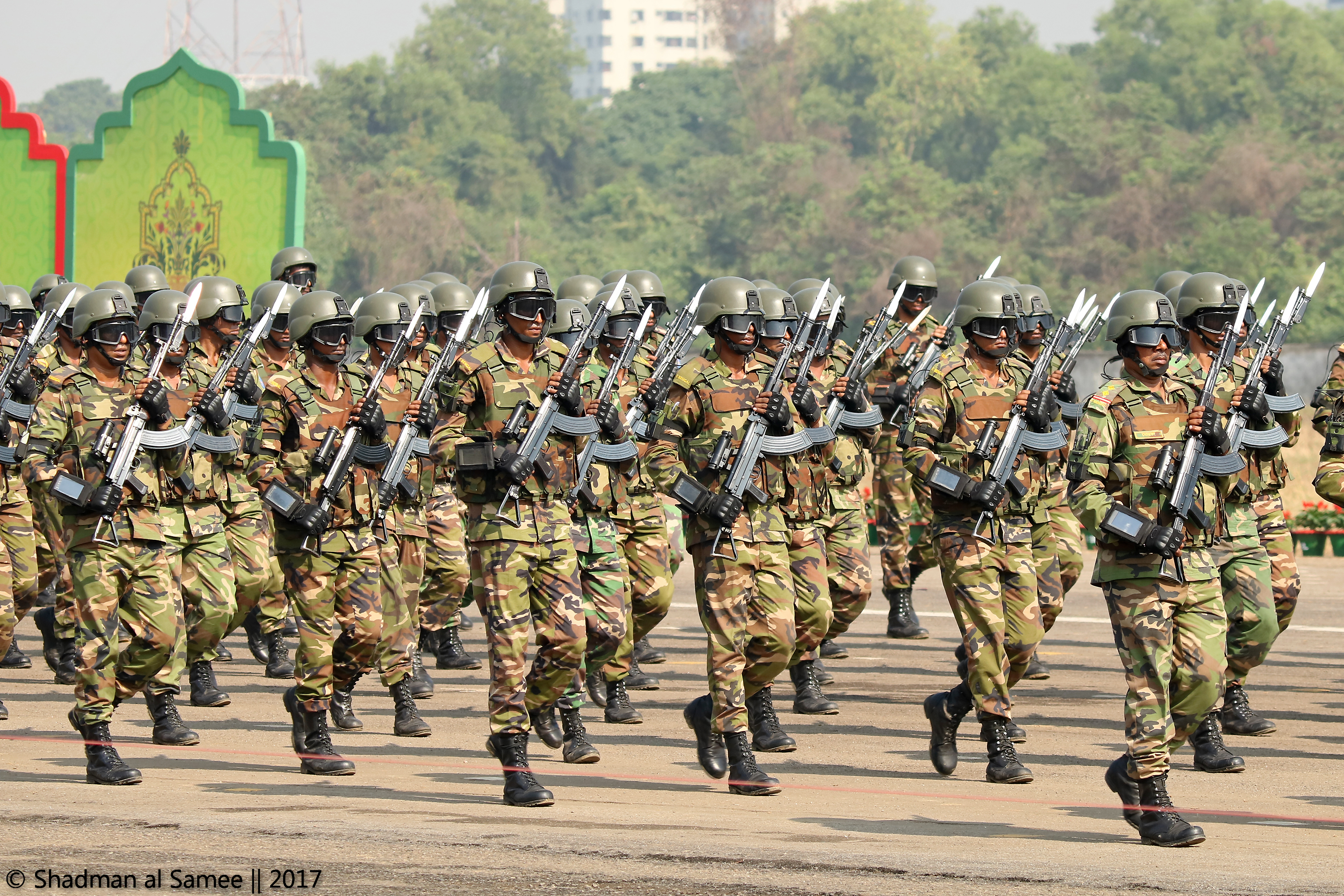
Army Parade, National Parade Square (2017)

On 16 and 17 October 2011, the CAAB upgraded it from a STOL port to a domestic airport. This increased the importance of the airport. The CAAB had declared this on their website, however, its website details on navigational aides, air traffic service and aeronautical communications for air operations in Bangladesh territory didn't mention Tejgaon airfield as an airport. A domestic airport requires all the technical features and passenger services as an international airport as per rules of the International Civil Aviation Organisation but the Tejgaon Airport does not have the services required for a STOL port.

== Former airlines and destinations (before 1981) ==
=== Passenger ===
Before all commercial flights moved to a new airport in 1981, the following airline that operates scheduled services at the airport.

Airlines	Destinations
Biman Bangladesh Airlines	Abu Dhabi, Bangkok, Calcutta, Chittagong, Comilla, Cox's Bazar, Doha, Dubai, Ishwardi, Jessore, Kathmandu, Karachi, Singapore, Sylhet, Thakurgaon

== Accidents and incidents ==
- 2 December 1970: a Canadair CL-44J freighter operated by Cargolux, aircraft registration TF-LLG, crashed into farmhouses on approach to Tejgaon Airport. All four crew members and three people on the ground were killed. Investigators concluded that the gust lock system engaged and locked the controls in flight due to a hydraulic fault.

== See also ==
- List of airports in Bangladesh
