= Ishwardi Airport =

Domestic airport in Bangladesh

Ishwardi Airport ঈশ্বরদী বিমানবন্দর
- IATA: IRD; ICAO: VGIS

Summary
- Airport type: Public
- Owner: Civil Aviation Authority of Bangladesh
- Operator: Civil Aviation Authority of Bangladesh
- Serves: Kushtia, Ishwardi & Pabna
- Location: Lalpur Upazila, Natore District, Bangladesh
- Coordinates: 24°09′11.51″N 089°02′55.04″E

Map
- Location of Ishurdi Airport

Runways
Direction	Length		Surface
Direction	ft	m	Surface
	4,700	1,433	Asphalt

Ishwardi Airport (IATA: IRD, ICAO: VGIS) is a domestic airport located in Lalpur Upazila in Natore District, Biman Bangladesh Airlines operated regular flights from here to Dhaka until 1996. On 18 November 2013, United Airways resumed flights to Dhaka, thus commercial services resumed after 17 years, but flights to the airport were suspended in mid-2014.

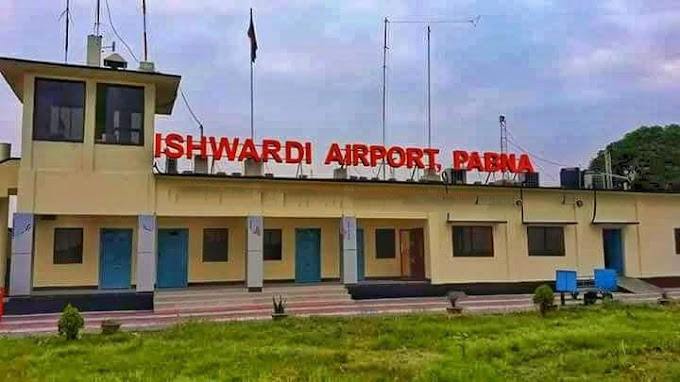
The Ishwardi Airport authority identifies itself to be located in Pabna District

== History ==
During World War II, the airport was known as the Hijli Base Area, and was used by the Twentieth Air Force. It hosted the United States Army Air Force XX Bomber Command 58th Bombardment Wing between 8 and 24 February 1945, prior to its deployment to the Mariana Islands.

== Airlines and destinations ==
As of August 2014, no airlines serve Ishwardi Airport. United Airways was the last airline to operate there; they stopped services in mid-2014.

== Location dispute ==
A persistent dispute has raged between residents of Natore and Pabna, each asserting that Ishwardi Airport is situated within their respective districts. In reality, the administrative building of the airport geographically falls under Lalpur Upazila of Natore District. But due to historical and socio-economic reasons, the airport area is considered to be a specialized administrative area of Ishwardi Upazila of Pabna District. According to official documents from Bangladesh's Civil Aviation Authority, the airport's location is documented as being within Pabna District.

== See also ==
- Operation Matterhorn
- List of airports in Bangladesh
