= Osmani International Airport =

International airport in Sylhet, Bangladesh

Osmani International Airport, Sylhet ওসমানী আন্তর্জাতিক বিমানবন্দর, সিলেট
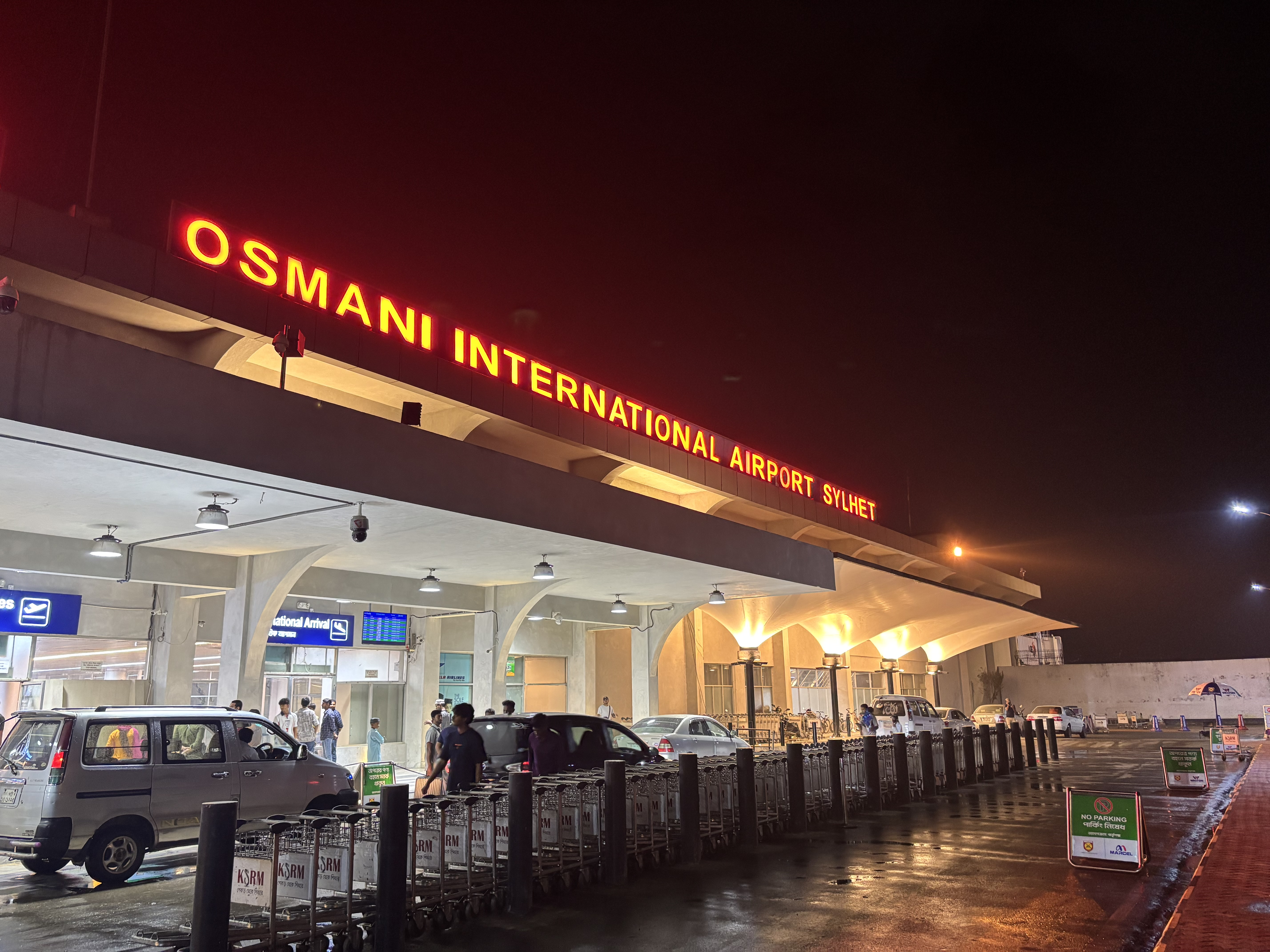
- Night view of Osmani International Airport
- IATA: ZYL; ICAO: VGSY

Summary
- Airport type: Public, military
- Owner: Government of Bangladesh
- Operator: Civil Aviation Authority of Bangladesh
- Serves: Sylhet
- Location: Airport Rd, Sylhet 3101, Bangladesh
- Hub for: Biman Bangladesh Airlines
- Focus city for: Air Astra; Novoair; US-Bangla Airlines
- Elevation AMSL: 50 ft (15 m)
- Coordinates: 24°57′48″N 91°52′01″E
- Website: oia.gov.bd

Map
- Location of airport in Bangladesh

Runways
Direction	Length		Surface
Direction	ft	m	Surface
11/29	10,236	3,120	Asphalt/Concrete

Statistics (January – December 2022)
- Passengers: 634,031 ▲
- Source: Civil Aviation Authority of Bangladesh

Osmani International Airport, Sylhet (Note: Bengali: ওসমানী আন্তর্জাতিক বিমানবন্দর, সিলেট, romanized: Osmani Antôrjatik Bimanbôndôr, Sileṭ, IPA: [ˈosmaˌniˑ ˈant̪ɔɾˌdʒat̪ik ˈbimanˌbɔnd̪ɔɾ, ˈsileʈ]) (IATA: ZYL, ICAO: VGSY), is the third largest airport in Bangladesh after Dhaka and Chittagong. The airport is operated by the Civil Aviation Authority and is served by Biman Bangladesh Airlines. Private airlines Novoair and US-Bangla Airlines operate domestic flights to Dhaka.

== History ==
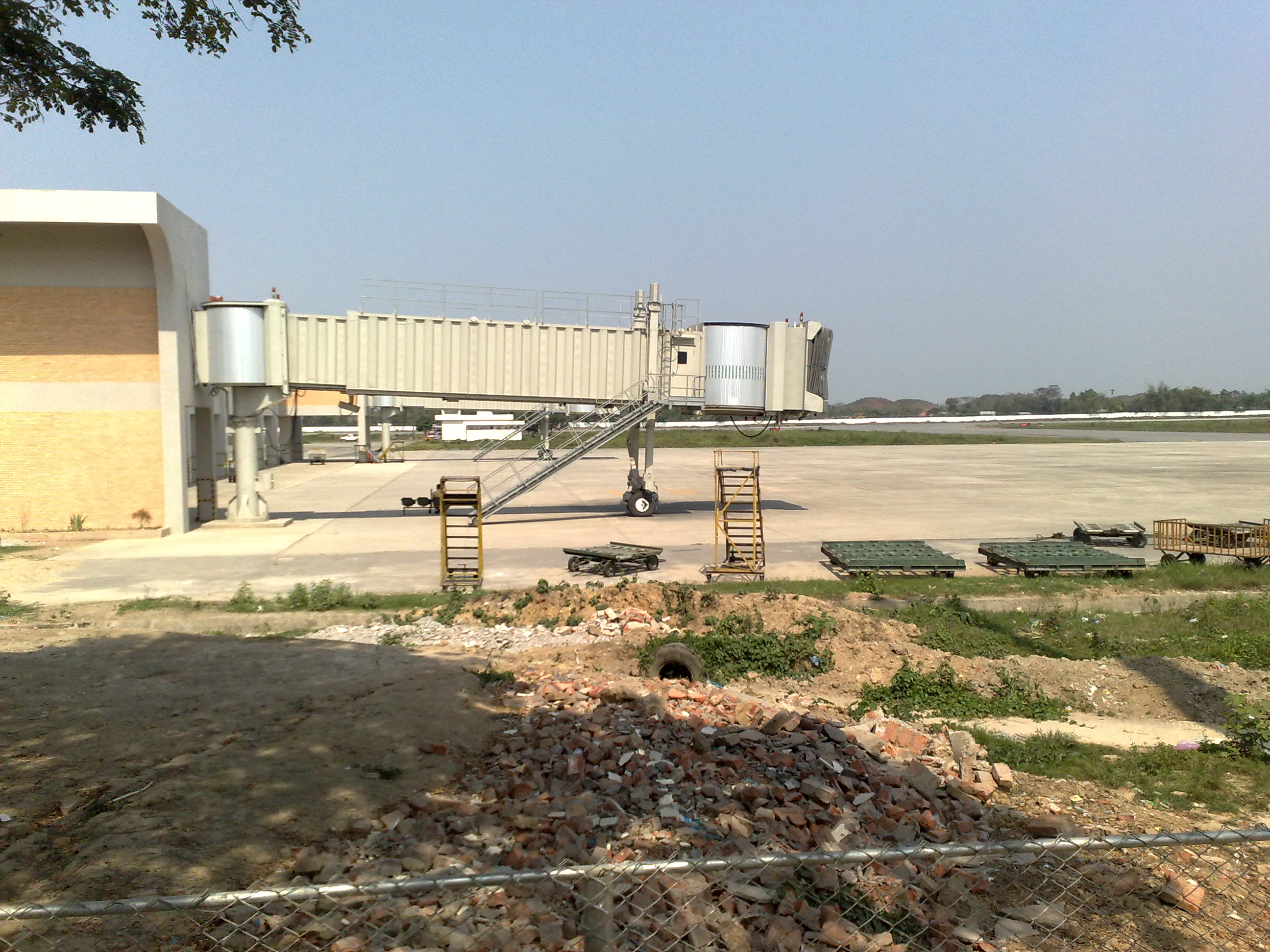
Apron view

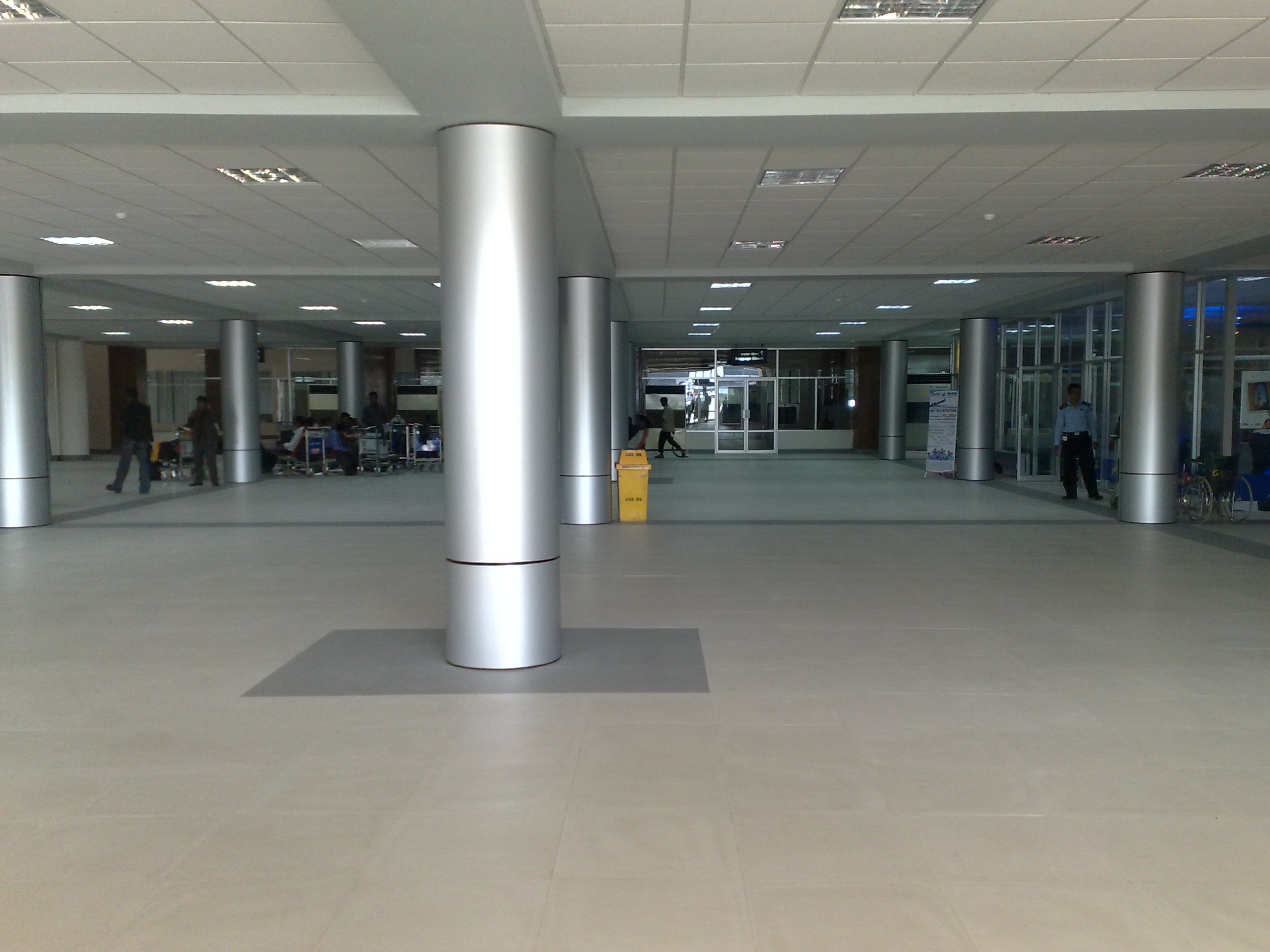
Interior view

Osmani International Airport was built during the British rule of the Indian Subcontinent, partly to check Japanese aggression from Burma. The airport was formerly known as Sylhet Civil Airport but was renamed after the military commander General M A G Osmani,.

The airport was initially served by domestic flights from Shahjalal International Airport by the country's national airline Biman Bangladesh Airlines. After many years of lobbying by expatriates living in the UK, limited expansion of the airport was carried out to enable medium-sized aircraft, such as the Airbus A310 used by Biman, to operate. The work was completed in October 2002 and the airport was designated an international airport by the government. However, the airport was not up to international standards to be capable of fully accommodating international flights due to many shortcomings with the instrument landing system and runway lighting system, and the designation was seen as a move to stave off pressure by the government.

Nevertheless, on 3 November 2002, the airport received its first international arrival. Biman flight BG020 from Kuwait via Abu Dhabi landed at 10:05 with 215 passengers en route to Dhaka. The disembarking passengers on the inaugural flight were greeted by then Finance & Planning Minister, M Saifur Rahman and State Minister for Civil Aviation and Tourism, Mir Mohammad Nasiruddin. For a brief period, Biman also operated a direct service from London but was later re-routed via Dhaka.

Additional expansion of the runway and improvements to the runway lighting and airport facilities were commenced in 2004 to enable wide-bodied aircraft to safely land and takeoff from the airport.

The South Asia Transport and Trade Facilitation Conference report of 2006 (by the United States Trade and Development Agency) noted that the development of the airport "up to the standards of [an] international airport" to "encourage private sector participation in air transport" was among projects under consideration by the government.

Work started in 2006 to upgrade the terminal facilities to enable handling of international flights. The improvements include construction of a new terminal building, two jetways and a taxiway. In May 2007, the foreign affairs adviser, informed journalists that the works were on schedule for completion in June 2007. He also confirmed that Biman will be operating Hajj flights directly from the airport during the Hajj season later in 2007. However, the runway expansion works had not been completed in June with the foreign affairs adviser indicating in August that "minor dressing work" still remained. The work was finally finished in December 2008.

In 2010, the decision was made to construct a refueling station. Construction work began in January 2012. In January 2014, the Project Director Aminul Haq stated that the project was 70% complete.

=== International flights ===
On 1 April 2015, Flydubai resumed foreign airline service to Sylhet with its flight from Dubai–International. Flydubai's introduction of nonstop flights from Dubai became the first international flights to Sylhet since the airport's "international" designation 18 years prior. The service was operated through a codeshare agreement with Bangladeshi airline Regent Airways. However, because Biman Bangladesh Airlines had refused to provide ground handling services, the route was cancelled the next day. Stranded passengers held a demonstration in response on 6 April 2015. In November 2016, Flydubai decided to start its flight again from Sylhet to the Middle East. This flight was ended on 7 September 2018.

In November 2020, US-Bangla Airlines started operating flight to Muscat, temporarily becoming the first Bangladeshi private airline to operate international flights from Sylhet. However, as of 2023, the flight no longer runs, with US-Bangla only running direct flights to Dhaka. On 12 November 2020, Biman Bangladesh Airlines started flights from Sylhet to Cox's Bazar, which was a first, a direct flight between two domestic airports without any connecting flight from Dhaka. Later, in March 2021, Biman started another direct flight between Chittagong and Sylhet, considering the demand of passengers for domestic tourism and commercial purposes.

After completion of runway strengthening works (2021), the long-standing demand for both outbound and inbound direct flights to and from the UK has been fulfilled. As of January 2022, Biman was operating 4 weekly roundtrip Dreamliner flights to London and 2 weekly roundtrip Dreamliner flights to Manchester from Sylhet. These flights all originate and terminate in Dhaka.

On 24 October 2022, Biman started operating a weekly flight from Sylhet non-stop to Jeddah. On 1 November 2022, Biman started operating a weekly flight from Sylhet non-stop to Sharjah. Both flights originate in Dhaka and follow the same route on the way back the next day. There is also a weekly Biman flight to Dubai from Sylhet.

== Expansion and development ==
In April 2020, a Chinese company, namely Beijing Urban Construction Group (BUCG), was appointed to construct a new terminal building including a cargo building, a modern equipped ATC tower, taxiway, apron and a modern fire station of the airport at a cost of ৳2116 crore (US$170 million). After completion of the new terminal building, the airport's passenger capacity would be enhanced to 2 million per annum from the current capacity of 600,000 per annum. There will be six boarding bridges and thirty-six check in counters in the new terminal building. The expansion would be completed by December 2027.

== Airlines and destinations ==
=== Passenger ===
Airlines	Destinations	Refs.
Air Astra	Dhaka	
Biman Bangladesh Airlines	Chattogram, Cox's Bazar, Dhaka, Doha, Dubai–International, Jeddah, London–Heathrow, Manchester, Medina, Sharjah	
Novoair	Dhaka	
SalamAir	Muscat	

=== Cargo ===
Airlines	Destinations	Refs.
SkyAir	Cox's Bazar, Dhaka	

== Accidents and incidents ==
- On 22 December 1997, Biman Bangladesh Airlines flight BG-609 carrying 85 passengers and 4 crew, operated by a Fokker F28-4000, managed to land in a paddy field 5.6 kilometres from the foot of the runway in heavy fog, on final approach from Dhaka. 17 passengers were injured.
- On 8 October 2004, Biman Bangladesh Airlines flight BG-601 carrying 79 passengers and 4 crew, operated by a Fokker F28-4000, inbound from Dhaka overran the wet runway and ended up in a ditch. Two passengers were injured.
- On 31 July 2025, a boarding bridge tire exploded while it was being changed during routine maintenance, killing one of the attending workers and injuring another.

== See also ==
- List of airports in Bangladesh
