= Flight 21 =

Flight 21 is the name of

- Eastern Air Lines Flight 21, crashed on 26 February 1941
- Canadian Pacific Air Lines Flight 21, crashed on 8 July 1965
- Singapore Airlines Flight 21, one of the longest regularly scheduled non-stop flights
- 1996 Croatia USAF CT-43 crash (Flight IFO-21), US Air Force plane that crashed on 3 April 1996
- True Aviation Flight 21 crashed on 9 March 2016
