= Hazrat Shahjalal International Airport =

International airport in Dhaka, Bangladesh

Hazrat Shahjalal International Airport হযরত শাহ্‌‌জালাল আন্তর্জাতিক বিমানবন্দর
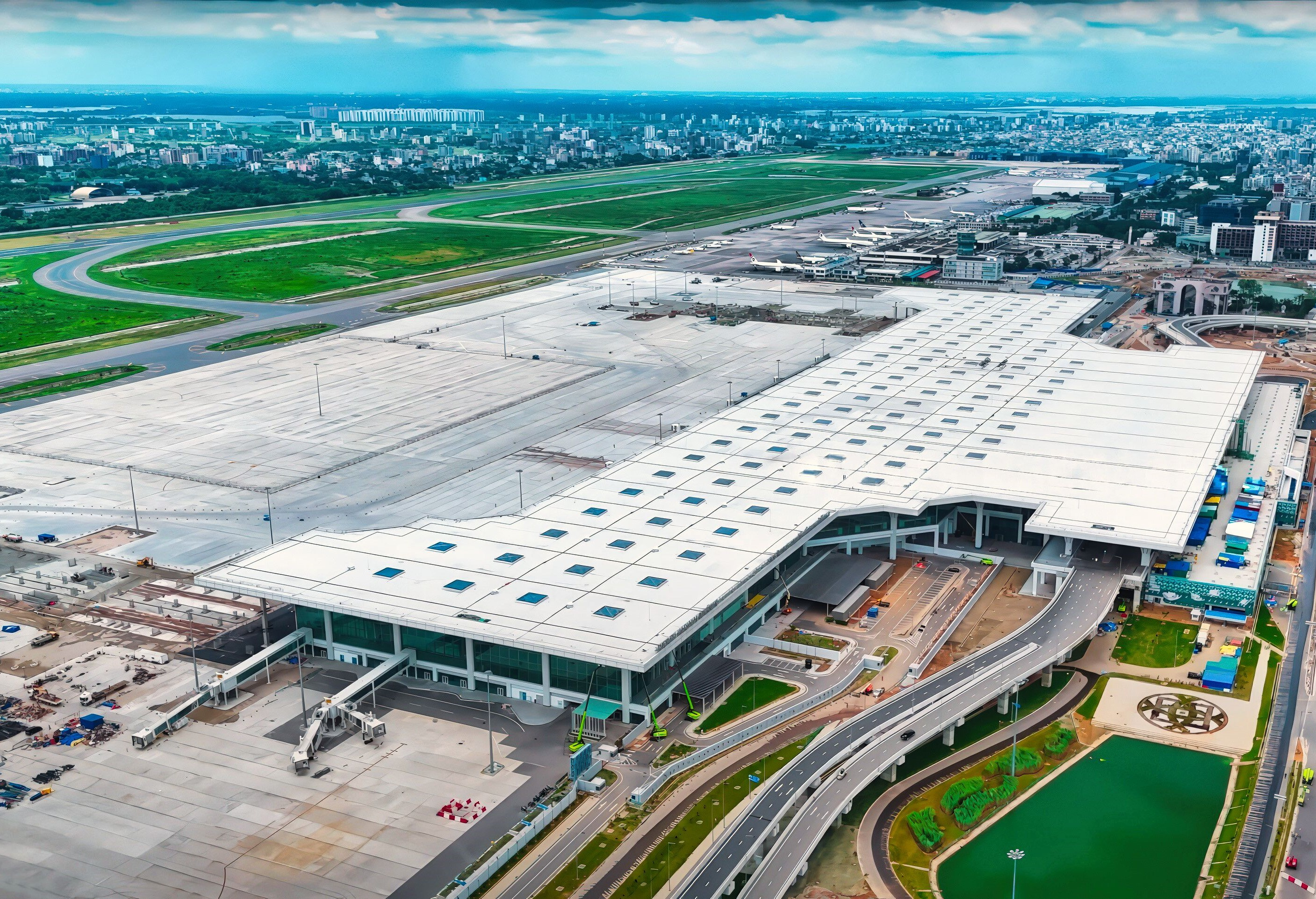
- IATA: DAC; ICAO: VGHS

Summary
- Airport type: Public / military
- Owner: Government of Bangladesh
- Operator: Civil Aviation Authority of Bangladesh
- Serves: Dhaka
- Location: Kurmitola, Dhaka-1229, Bangladesh
- Opened: 1981; 45 years ago
- Hub for: Air Astra; Biman Bangladesh Airlines; Easy Fly Express; Fly Dhaka Airlines; Novoair; SkyAir; US-Bangla Airlines
- Elevation AMSL: 27 ft (8.2 m)
- Coordinates: 23°50′34″N 090°24′02″E
- Website: hsia.gov.bd

Map
- Location of airport in Bangladesh

Runways
Direction	Length		Surface
Direction	m	ft	Surface
14/32	3,505	11,500	Asphalt

Statistics (2025)
- Passenger movements: 12,720,000
- Cargo handled (tonnes): 517,940
- Source: Civil Aviation Authority, Bangladesh

Hazrat Shahjalal International Airport (Bengali: হযরত শাহ্‌‌জালাল আন্তর্জাতিক বিমানবন্দর, ঢাকা, romanized: Hôjôrôt Śāhjālāl Āntôrjātik Bimānbôndôr; IATA: DAC, ICAO: VGHS, formerly VGZR) is the primary international airport serving Dhaka, the capital of Bangladesh. It is the country's largest and busiest airport and is situated in Kurmitola, 17 km (11 mi) from the city centre, in northern Dhaka. The airport also serves as a base for the Bangladesh Air Force, named BAF Base Bir Uttom A. K. Khandker.

With an area of 802 hectares (1,981 acres), the airport is owned and operated by Civil Aviation Authority of Bangladesh (CAAB). It commenced operations in 1980, replacing Tejgaon Airport as the principal international airport of the country. The airport was formerly known as Dacca International Airport and later as Zia International Airport, before being named in honour of Shah Jalal, a prominent Sufi saint associated with the spread of Islam in Bengal. The IATA code of the airport, "DAC", is derived from the former English spelling of Dhaka, Dacca.

It is the primary hub of most of airlines in Bangladesh including Air Astra, Novoair, US-Bangla Airlines, and the national flag carrier Biman Bangladesh Airlines. The annual passenger handling capacity of the airport is 18.5 million passengers, and this passenger handling capacity is predicted by CAAB to be sufficient until 2026. In 2014, the airport handled 9.1 million passengers and 248,000 tonnes of cargo. Average aircraft movement per day is around 190 flights. Ground handling at the airport is provided by Biman Ground Handling, which is a wholly owned subsidiary of Biman Bangladesh Airlines. The airport has multiple First Class and Business Class executive lounges operated by Five Star hotels, such as Intercontinental Dhaka; Bangladeshi companies such as Eastern Bank Skylounge or City Bank American Express Lounge; as well as local and foreign airlines.

== Location and connectivity ==
The airport is located in Kurmitola, 11 nautical miles (20.37 kilometres; 12.66 miles) north of downtown Dhaka. It can be accessed by the eight-lane Airport Road. To the north of the airport lies Uttara area and Gazipur city, while Dhaka city lies to its south. There is a railway station immediately outside (facing) the airport named Airport Railway Station. Lots of Bangladeshi and international ride sharing and ride hailing apps or companies operate vehicles to and from the airport such as Obhai, Pathao, Shohoz, Uber, etc. There is also a taxi kiosk, located near the exit gate of the international arrivals concourse hall, where one can order a taxi and pre-pay the taxi fare. The airport has been almost engulfed by the city, due to the expansion and development work of real estate companies and the government, prompting the authorities to construct a third terminal and consider building another international airport elsewhere in Dhaka district.

== History ==
In 1941, during the Second World War, the British government built a landing strip at Kurmitola, several kilometres north of Tejgaon, as a spare landing strip for the Tejgaon Airport, which at the time was a military airport, to operate warplanes towards the war fields of Kohima (then in Assam) and Burmese war theatres.

After the Partition of India in 1947, Tejgaon Airport became the first civilian airport in what was then East Pakistan (present day Bangladesh). During the 1965 Indo-Pakistani war, the then abandoned airstrip was bombed by Indian Air Force, thinking it to be the Tejgaon Airport as the base.

After independence, the Government of Bangladesh restarted works abandoned by the previous contractors and consultants during the war. The government decided to make the airport Bangladesh's main international airport and appointed Aéroports de Paris of France as its new consultants. The airport began operations in 1980 after the main runway and central portion of the present terminal building was formally opened by then President of Bangladesh Ziaur Rahman (assassinated in 1981) as Dacca International Airport ("Dacca" is the former spelling of "Dhaka"). The project was completed in 1983. Then President Abdus Sattar re-inaugurated the airport as Zia International Airport.

In December 1993, Biman Bangladesh Airlines launched a route to New York City via Delhi, Dubai and Amsterdam. The flight was operated by McDonnell Douglas DC-10s. Biman later routed the outbound flight from Dhaka through Dubai and Brussels and the inbound one through Brussels. The company discontinued the service in July 2006. In 2010, the government changed the airport's name once again, from Zia International Airport to the present name of 'Shahjalal International Airport', in honour of Shah Jalal, one of the most respected Sufi saints of Bangladesh.

On 6 December 2011, a Boeing 787-9 (flight ZA006) stopped for refuelling at Shahjalal International Airport during a distance, speed, and endurance record attempt. This aircraft, powered by General Electric GEnx engines, had flown 10,710 nautical miles (19,830 km) non-stop from Boeing Field in Seattle, Washington eastward to Shahjalal International Airport, setting a new world distance record for aircraft in the weight class of the 787, which is between 440,000 pounds (200,000 kg) and 550,000 pounds (250,000 kg). This flight surpassed the previous distance record of 9,127 nautical miles (16,903 km), set in 2002 by an Airbus A330. The Boeing 787 then continued eastbound from Dhaka to return to Boeing Field, setting a world-circling speed record of 42 hours, 27 minutes.

In July 2022, Biman inaugurated a route to Toronto using Boeing 787s. The flight from Dhaka to Toronto made a technical stop in Istanbul, the inbound flight was nonstop. Four months later, the airline routed the latter via Istanbul as well.

=== 2025 fire ===
On 18 October 2025, at around 2:30 PM (BST), a fire broke out in the cargo section near Gate 8 of the Hazrat Shahjalal International Airport, Dhaka. Due to high flame and smoke all the flight were suspended and diverted to Kolkata Airport, Chittagong Airport and Sylhet Airport. The fire was extinguished by the Fire Service at 9:18 PM, enabling the airport to resume its operations. The Dhaka Customs Agents Association suspects that the fire was intentional.

Sheikh Bashir Uddin, the civil aviation advisor to the interim government, stated is too early to say if the fire was caused by sabotage. At least thirty seven unit of Fire Service, two fire units of Air Force, Navy, and BGB were involved in fighting the flames. The Bangladesh Army has been deployed to the airport to assist with search and rescue efforts. Investigations into the incident are underway, with committees formed by the Fire Service and local authorities. Chief Advisor Muhammad Yunus stated that, The government will take immediate and firm action if any credible evidence of sabotage or arson is found.

At least 25 members of the Bangladesh Ansar have been injured in this incident. It caused severe damage to the cargo area, including sections where international courier goods and chemicals were stored. The fire also spread to the airport's post office, burning imported items such as chemicals, fabrics, and other materials. All cargo consignments were insured, and compensation is expected, although the total extent of damage is still being assessed. Initially, losses and damages are expected to cost around 10 thousand crores BDT (around US$800 million) to over US$1 billion. Experts fear that warehouses and an air express is completely burnt down.

Several flights were diverted to Kolkata, Sylhet and Chittagong. Airport operations were suspended, and the airfield was closed until 9 PM (BST). Biman Bangladesh Airlines has formed an investigation committee into the incident. The committee has been asked to submit an investigation report within the next 5 working days.

== Development and expansion ==
The airport has been set up and upgraded with technology and instruments worth ৳70 million (US$570,000) up to the second quarter of 2012, by the CAAB. They include instrument landing system, distance measuring equipment and flight calibration system, which will help the operational standards of the airport. Two more boarding bridges have been operational, and another is under manufacturing. Asphalt runway overlay began in December 2012 by the Bangladeshi company Abdul Monem Ltd; it took six months to complete. Further improvements in the taxiway and runway lighting system will be made by funds from Danish International Development Agency (DANIDA) worth ৳4.5 billion (US$37 million). Further projects include primary and secondary radar, a new control tower and a modern drainage system.

Parking facilities are being upgraded, both for passenger and cargo aircraft, of the airport extension works of passenger and cargo aprons are also going on. The project will cost ৳440 million (US$3.6 million) and will provide facility to park four wide-bodied passenger aircraft and two wide-bodied cargo aircraft side by side. In recent years, CAAB has completed modernisation and beautification of the two terminal buildings, constructed five aircraft parking bays, installed two more boarding bridges, re-installed a power plant to ensure 24 hours power supply, and added more passenger check-in and immigration counters and baggage conveyor belts.

In October 2021, the CAAB entered into an agreement with the French company Thales LAS to construct a new advanced radar system at the airport. Valued at ৳730.13 crore (US$59 million), this system will replace the decades-old existing radar, which lacks the capability to detect all aircraft flying over Bangladesh's airspace, particularly those over the Bay of Bengal. The project aimed at achieving full surveillance of the entire airspace of the country is scheduled to be fully operational by mid-2024.

=== Development of the third terminal ===
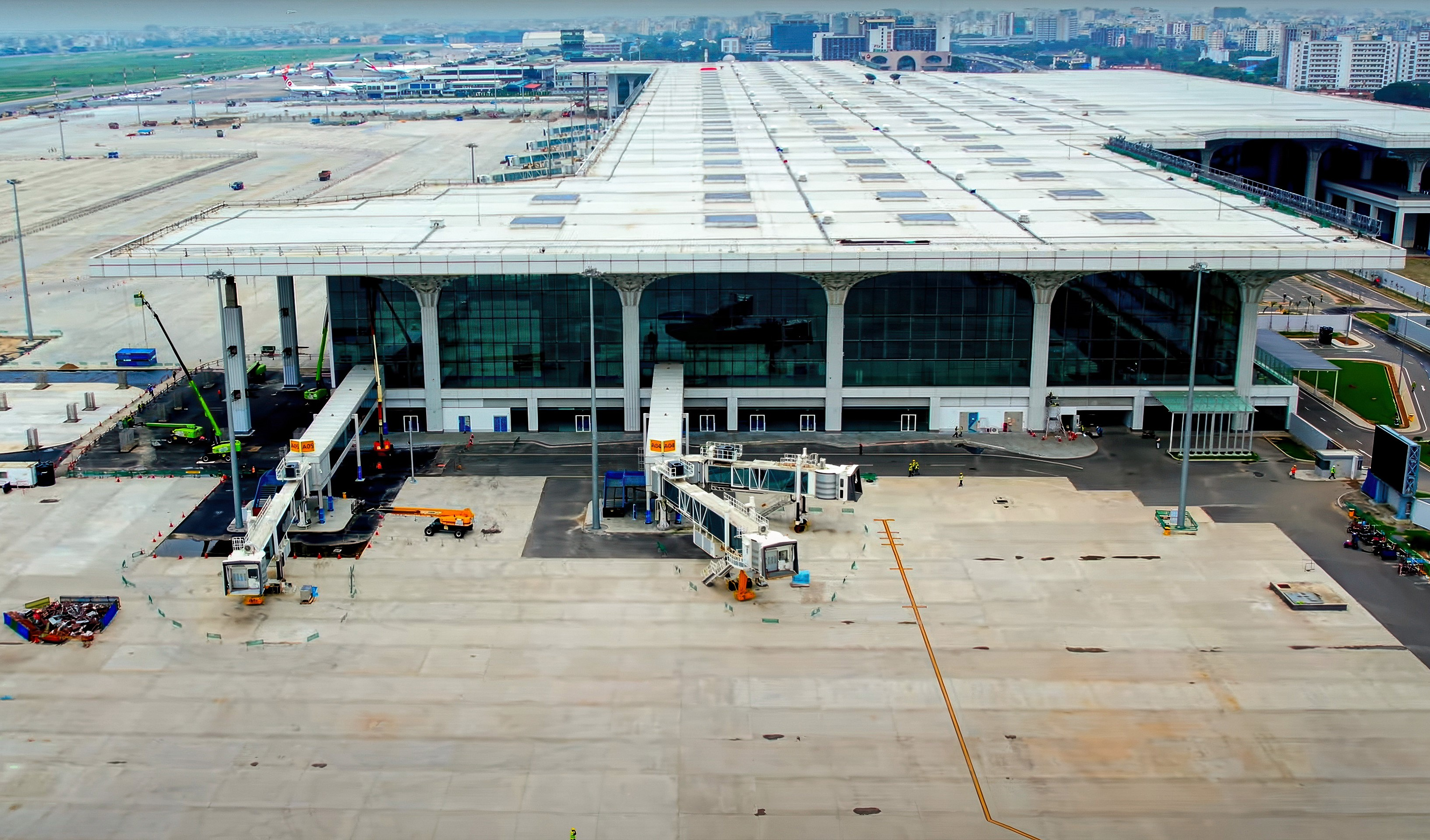
HSIA Terminal 3 under construction, September 2024

On 28 December 2019, Prime Minister Sheikh Hasina laid the foundation stone of the third terminal of Hazrat Shahjalal International Airport. The construction work of the third terminal will be done by Aviation Dhaka Consortium (ADC), which comprises Mitsubishi Corporation, Fujita Corporation and Samsung C&T Corporation. The estimated cost of the whole project is ৳21398 crore (US$1.7 billion). The terminal building was designed by Singaporean architect Rohani Baharin.

The construction of the new third terminal of the airport was expected to be completed by May 2024. The Japan International Cooperation Agency (JICA) provided the financial assistance of ৳16141 crore (US$1.3 billion) for the project in the form of loans, while the rest of ৳5257 crore (US$430 million) was contributed by the government of Bangladesh. The terminal will cover an area of 542,000 m^{2} (134 acres), including the passenger terminal with a floor area of roughly 230,000 m^{2} (2,500,000 ft^{2}); a 5,900 m^{2} (64,000 ft^{2}) square VVIP complex; a 41,200 m^{2} (443,000 ft^{2}) cargo building; and multi-level car parking building having a capacity of parking 1,044 cars, with a tunnel. Upon completion of the third terminal, the passenger handling capacity of the airport will increase to 24 million from the current 8 million per annum. 37 aeroplanes can be parked at the terminal at once. Cargo handling capacity will also increase to 500,000 from 200,000 tonnes annually. A corridor will also be built to connect the new terminal with the two existing terminals.

In March 2026, State Minister for Civil Aviation and Tourism M Rashiduzzaman Millat has said it may take six to nine months to launch operations from the third terminal of Hazrat Shahjalal International Airport.

=== Second runway ===
A feasibility study was conducted to add a parallel, second runway at a cost of ৳10 billion (US$81 million) in 2014. The project was undertaken to cope with rising air traffic, to take pressure off the lone runway, and to double the capacity of the airport. CAAB predicts that the airport's traffic will surpass 10 million passengers and freight. However, 60% of the airport's 2000-acre land remained unutilized in 2014.

In July 2023, CAAB submitted its report to Ministry of Civil Aviation about the possibility of constructing a second dependent runway in the airport due to space constraints. In its report, the CAAB suggested constructing 3,292 m (10,801 ft) long-dependent runway with the existing runway to be extended to 3,692 m (12,113 ft). The new runway will not be used for take-off and landings simultaneously as the proximity between the two runways will be just 359 meters against the ICAO mandated 1,035-meter space needed for ILS-enabled runway. However, the second runway will be mainly used for taxiing or preparing for take-off during busy hours and will be used for take-off and landings in case the main runway remains closed due to an emergency or maintenance. The construction of the second runway is expected to be started after the completion of the third terminal in 2026 or later.

== Terminals ==
=== Terminal 1, Terminal 2 and Domestic Terminal ===
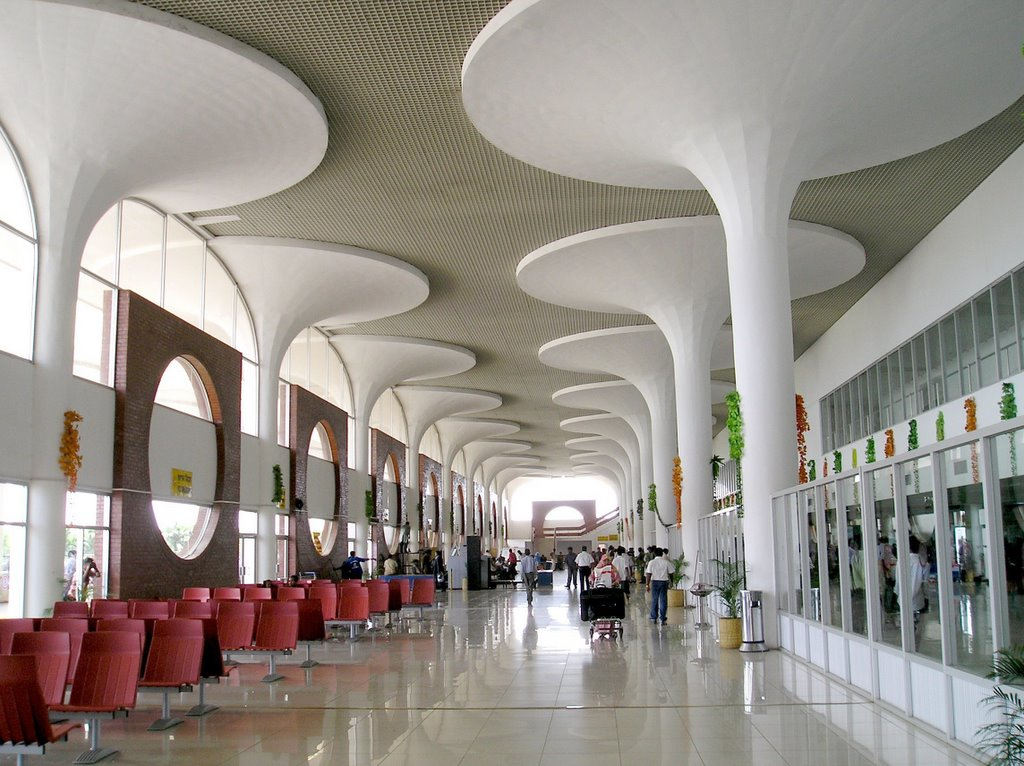
Terminal interior

The airport has three major terminals. Terminal 1 (T1) and Terminal 2 (T2) are for international flights, and they are located in the same building. T1, on the ground floor, is used as the international arrivals concourse hall. T2, on the first floor, serves as the international departures concourse hall. A third adjacent terminal building, known as the Domestic Terminal, is for domestic flights. This is located to the left of the international terminals. In the single-storey Domestic Terminal, both the arrivals concourse hall and the departures concourse hall are on the same floor.

=== Terminal 3 ===
Construction of the third terminal started in December 2019 and is still under construction. According to the project design, the facilities of the terminal include 26 boarding bridges, of which 12 will be built in the first phase and the remaining 14 at a later phase, 16 conveyor belts, 115 check-in counters including 15 self-check-in kiosks, 64 departure immigration desks, 59 arrival immigration, 3 VIP immigration desks and 10 automated 'e-gates' at the exit. For passengers' convenience there will be 12 walkalators, 35 escalators, and 43 elevators.

On 7 October 2023, the terminal was partially inaugurated, with 90 percent physical work being done, by the then Prime Minister Sheikh Hasina. However, due to delays in decision making regarding issues like logistics, ground handling, training, system calibration etc. Terminal 3 is not expected to enter into operation until at least 2026.

In April 2026, State Minister for Civil Aviation Rashiduzzaman Millat stated that the terminal will likely open by 16 December or early 2027.

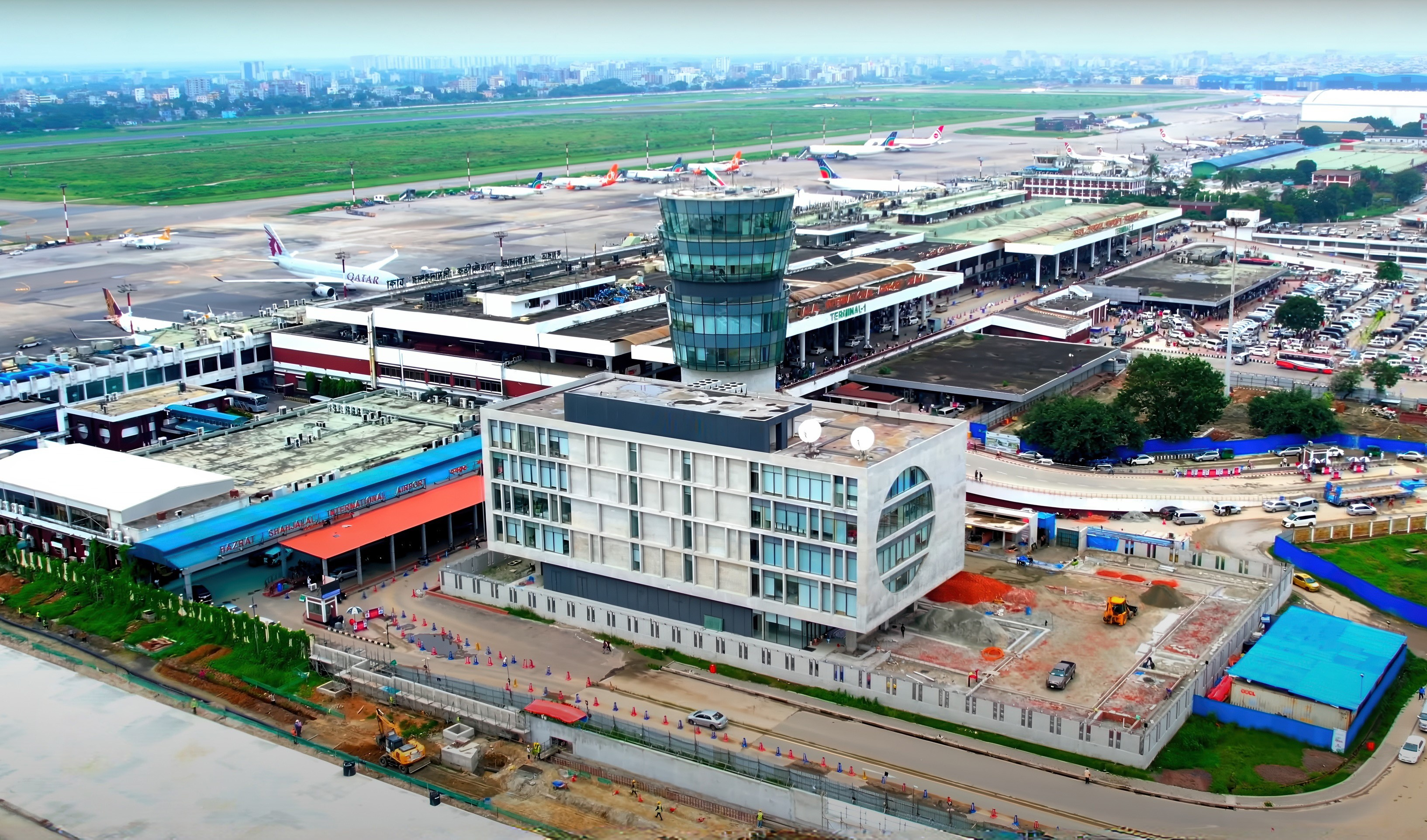
HSIA Terminal 1&2 in 2024

=== VIP terminal ===
A VIP terminal building was located to the right of the international terminals. The VIP terminal was built only about 200 metres (220 yards) from the main gate. However to make way for the construction of the new third terminal, the demolition of the VIP Terminal commenced in April 2023. A temporary terminal has been constructed to provide VIP services, and the VIP services will be shifted to the Third Terminal in the future.

=== Cargo terminal ===
There is a cargo terminal at the airport which has a capacity of 200,000 tons per annum. This will be increased to 500,000 tons after the completion of the ongoing renovation and expansion project.

== Airlines and destinations ==
=== Passenger ===
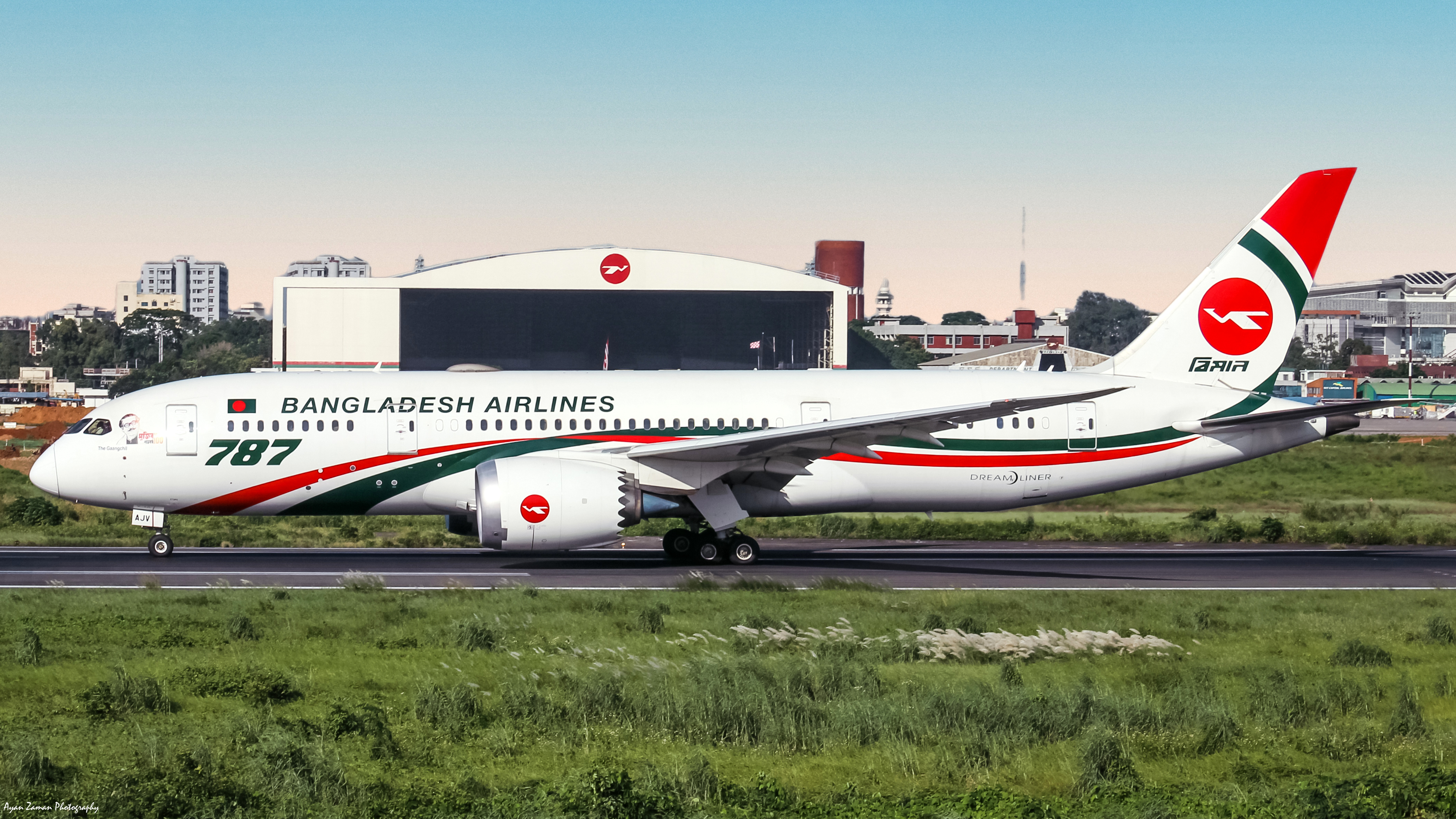
Boeing 787-8 Dreamliner of Biman Bangladesh

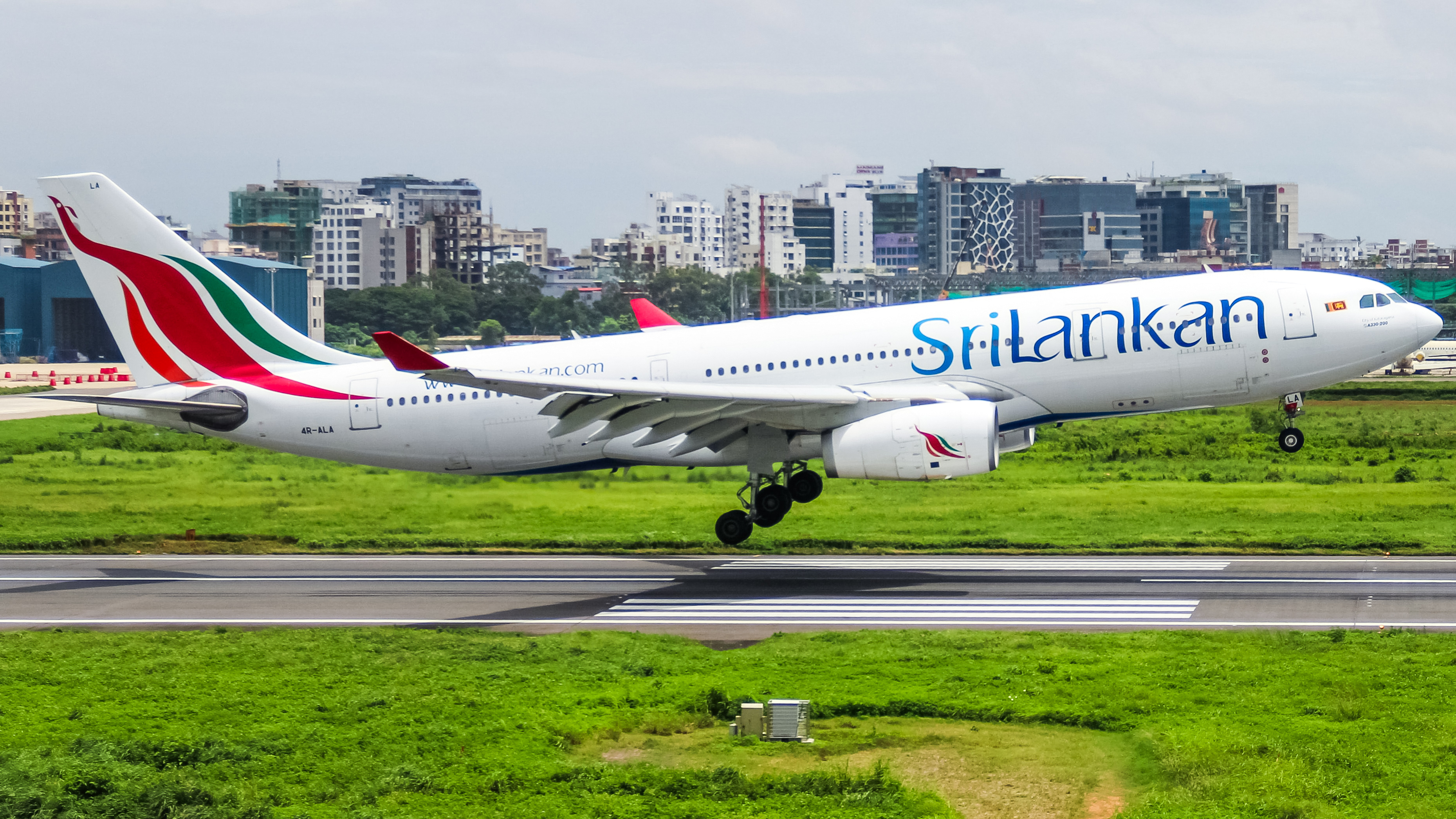
Airbus A330-243 of SriLankan Airlines

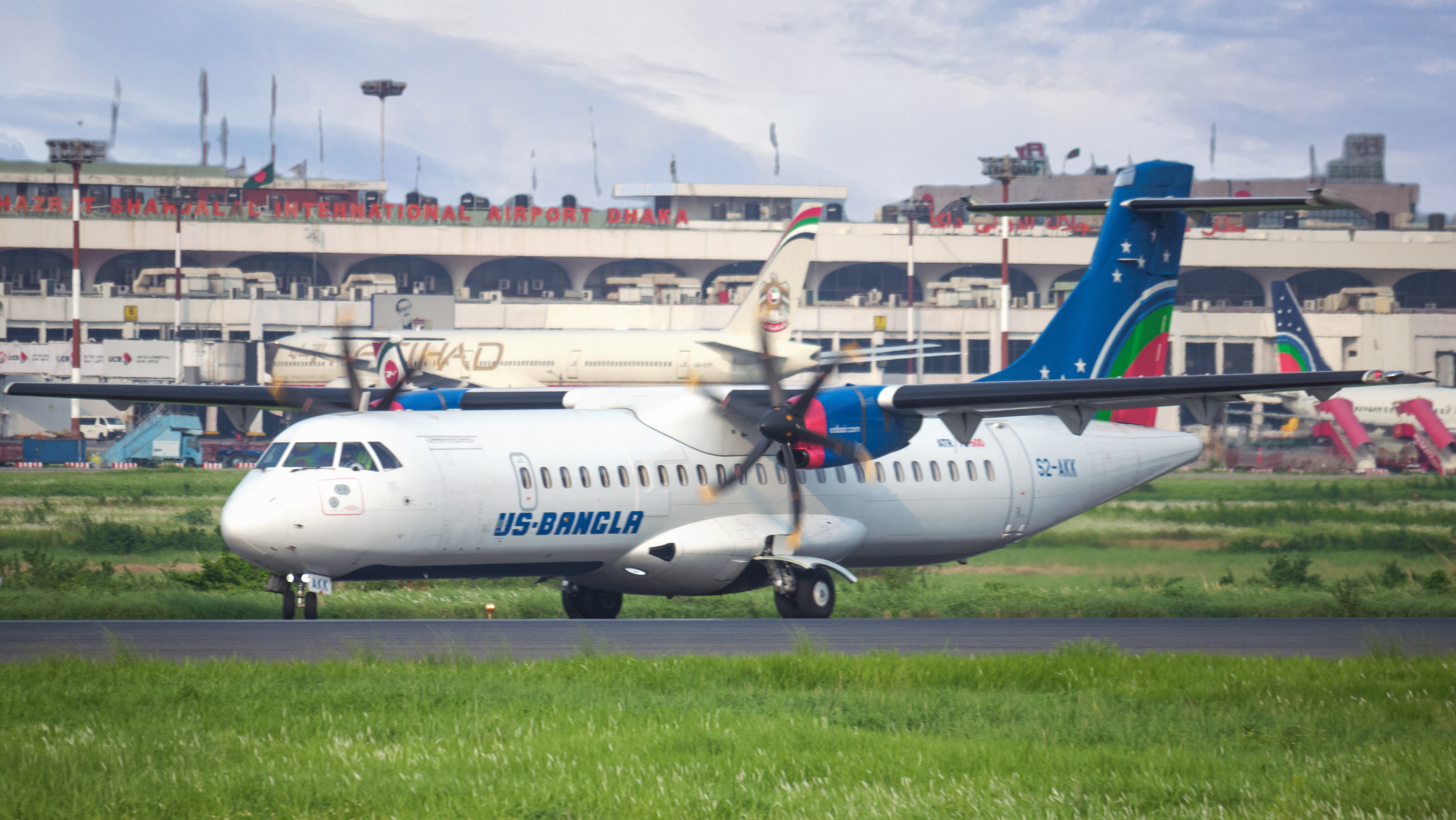
ATR 72-600 of US-Bangla Airlines

Airlines	Destinations
Air Astra	Chattogram, Cox's Bazar, Sylhet
Air India	Delhi
Air India Express	Kolkata
Biman Bangladesh Airlines	Chennai, Guangzhou, Karachi, Manchester, (Note: Manchester service operates via Sylhet.) Rome–Fiumicino, Toronto–Pearson (Note: This flight makes a technical stop at Istanbul for refueling and crew change. Biman Bangladesh does not carry passengers solely from Dhaka to Istanbul, nor does the airline have fifth freedom rights to fly passengers from Istanbul to Toronto.)
China Eastern Airlines	Kunming
Egyptair	Cairo
Ethiopian Airlines	Addis Ababa
Etihad Airways	Seasonal: Abu Dhabi
FitsAir	Colombo–Bandaranaike
Flydubai	Dubai–International
Himalaya Airlines	Kathmandu
IndiGo	Chennai, Delhi, Kolkata, Mumbai
Jazeera Airways	Kuwait City
Malaysia Airlines	Kuala Lumpur–International
Myanmar Airways International	Yangon
Novoair	Chattogram, Cox's Bazar, Jashore, Rajshahi, Saidpur, Sylhet
Oman Air	Muscat
Riyadh Air	Riyadh
US-Bangla Airlines	Abu Dhabi, Chennai, Jeddah, Male, Riyadh, Saidpur, Sharjah

=== Cargo ===
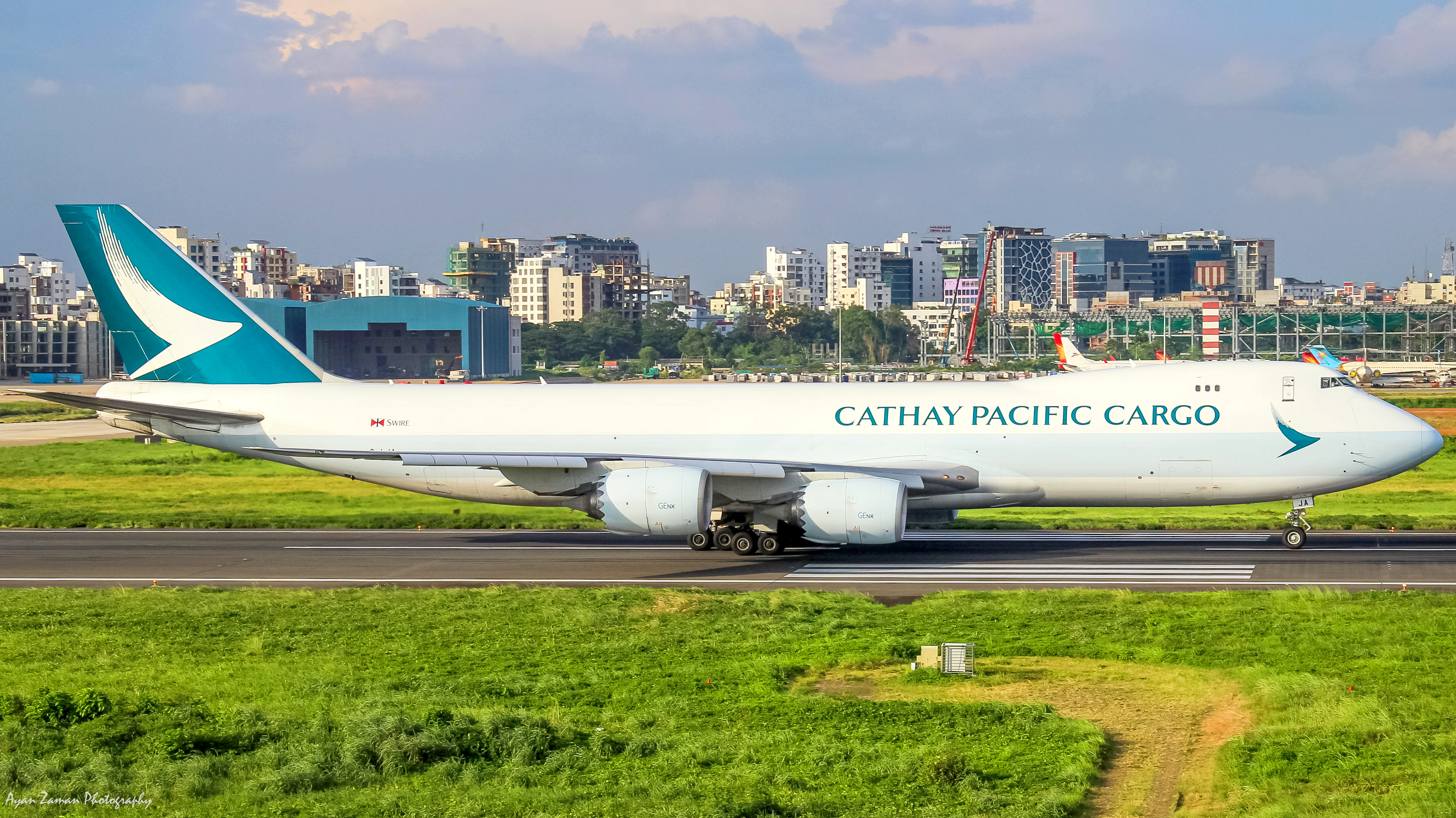
Boeing 747 of Cathay Pacific Cargo

Airlines	Destinations	Refs.
Easy Fly Express	Delhi, Guangzhou, Hong Kong, Kolkata, Zhengzhou	
My Freighter Airlines	Tashkent	

== Accidents and incidents ==
- On 13 December 1944: a USAAF B-24 Liberator crashed at Kurmitola. This incident resulted in 7 fatalities among the 8 crew members on board.
- On 8 January 1945: A RAAF DC-3 crashed due to fog during landing killing the 4 crew on board along with 12 troops.
- On 10 December 1971: A Pakistan air force rotary wing aviation of no 6 squadron MIL MI-8 crashed after taking off from the helipad near some fields killing all 8 personal on board.
- On 4 December 1971: A PAF Two F-86 Sabres Shot down in dogfights directly over Dhaka while defending the airfields against IAF strikes. The pilots ejected safely but were not seen again and were assumed killed by the local populace.
- On 4 December 1971: A One Twin Otter of Pakistan air force (on the ground) Destroyed on the ground at Tejgaon airfield during an afternoon MiG-21 raid and repetitive striking of IAF raids.
- On 4 December 1971 again: A One Sukhoi Su-7 (No. 221 Squadron) of Indian air force Shot down by AAA fire over Tejgaon. The pilot, Squadron Leader V. Bhutani, ejected and became a Prisoner of War (POW).
- On 4 December 1971: Two Hawker Hunters (No. 37 Squadron) of Indian air force Both were shot down over the Tejgaon airfield by anti-aircraft (AAA) fire while on a raid. Both pilots, Squadron Leader S.B. Samanta and Flying Officer S.G. Khonde, were killed.
