= Saidpur Airport =

Domestic airport in Rangpur Division, Bangladesh

Saidpur Airport সৈয়দপুর বিমানবন্দর
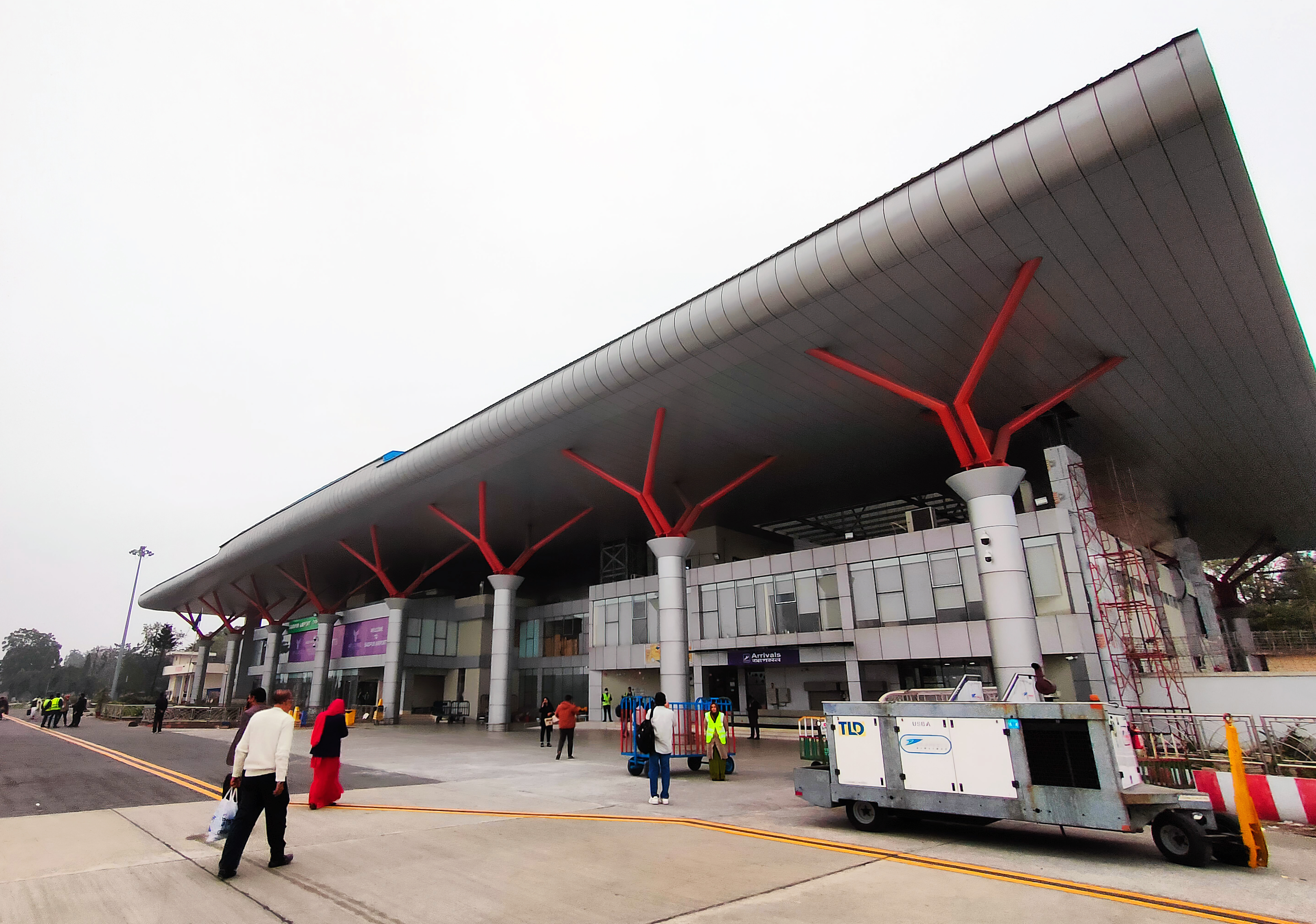
- IATA: SPD; ICAO: VGSD

Summary
- Airport type: Public
- Operator: Civil Aviation Authority of Bangladesh
- Serves: Rangpur Division
- Location: Saidpur, Nilphamari, Rangpur, Bangladesh
- Elevation AMSL: 125 ft (38 m)
- Coordinates: 25°45′33″N 088°54′31″E
- Website: caab.gov.bd

Map
- Location of airport in Bangladesh

Runways
Direction	Length		Surface
Direction	ft	m	Surface
16/34	6,000	1,829	Asphalt

Statistics (January 2018 – January 2019)
- Passengers: 3,12,840 ▲

Saidpur Airport (Bengali: সৈয়দপুর বিমানবন্দর, romanized: Soiyodpur bimanbondor) (IATA: SPD, ICAO: VGSD) is a domestic airport located in Saidpur, Nilphamari District, Rangpur Division, Bangladesh. The airport is operated by the Civil Aviation Authority, Bangladesh.

Biman Bangladesh Airlines, Novoair, Air Astra and US-Bangla Airlines all operate flights to Dhaka.

Saidpur is a city of Nilphamari district in Rangpur Division, and Saidpur Airport is one of the northernmost airports in the country. It started its journey as a domestic airport in 1979, and now handles roughly 30 flights daily on the Dhaka-Saidpur-Dhaka route.

The airport is currently undergoing major upgrades and expansion, and is expected to serve international flights between Nepal and Bangladesh, to strengthen bilateral trade and tourism. After this upgrade, it will make this airport the fourth international airport of Bangladesh.

== Airlines and destinations ==
There are currently 4 airlines operating to Saidpur. The airlines operate regional turboprop aircraft, namely the ATR 72 and the Bombardier De Havilland Canada Dash 8 Q400.

Airlines	Destinations	Refs.
Air Astra	Dhaka	
Biman Bangladesh Airlines	Cox's Bazar, Dhaka	
Novoair	Dhaka	
US-Bangla Airlines	Chattogram, Dhaka	

=== Flights to Nepal ===
In February 2020, the governments of Bangladesh and Nepal began negotiations to allow Nepal to operate flights directly to Saidpur from Nepal to strengthen the trade between the two countries and attract tourism. As of March 2021, direct international flights to either Biratnagar or Bhadrapur Airport in Eastern Nepal from Saidpur have been proposed, pending completion of the currently ongoing upgrade and expansion of Saidpur Airport.

== Upgrade and expansion ==
In 2018, the Civil Aviation and Tourism Ministry started work on expanding Saidpur Airport in Nilphamari to upgrade it to international standards. For the continuation of expansion work, the ministry has acquired 912 acres (369 ha) of land from the Saidpur municipality and the Parbatipur upazila of Dinajpur. The current runway will be expanded to 12,000 feet (3,700 m) from 6,000 feet (1,800 m), making it one of the longest runways in the country.

== Accidents and incidents ==
- On 4 September 2015, US-Bangla Airlines Flight BS-151, inbound from Dhaka, operated by a Bombardier DHC-8-400 registration S2-AGU, sustained minor damage to its right main landing gear after it went off the paved surface while making the backtrack to the terminal after landing. There were no injuries reported from the incident, and the aircraft was able to operate the return flight BS-152 safely after being towed to the apron, with an 8-hour delay. The aircraft was later involved in US-Bangla Airlines Flight 211, which crashed in Kathmandu.
- On 25 October 2017, a Biman Bangladesh Airlines Bombardier DHC-8-400 registration S2-AGR, operating as Flight BG-494 from Saidpur to Dhaka, lost its right main landing gear during the initial takeoff climb when the wheel separated from the aircraft and fell to the ground below. The flight continued to Dhaka and landed safely after performing a low approach to have the landing gear inspected from the ground.
- On 17 November 2021, a Novoair ATR 72 registration S2-AHF, operating as Flight VQ-967 from Dhaka to Saidpur, suffered a failed nose landing gear during landing. No injuries were reported.

== See also ==
- List of airports in Bangladesh
