= Air Astra =

Bangladeshi airline

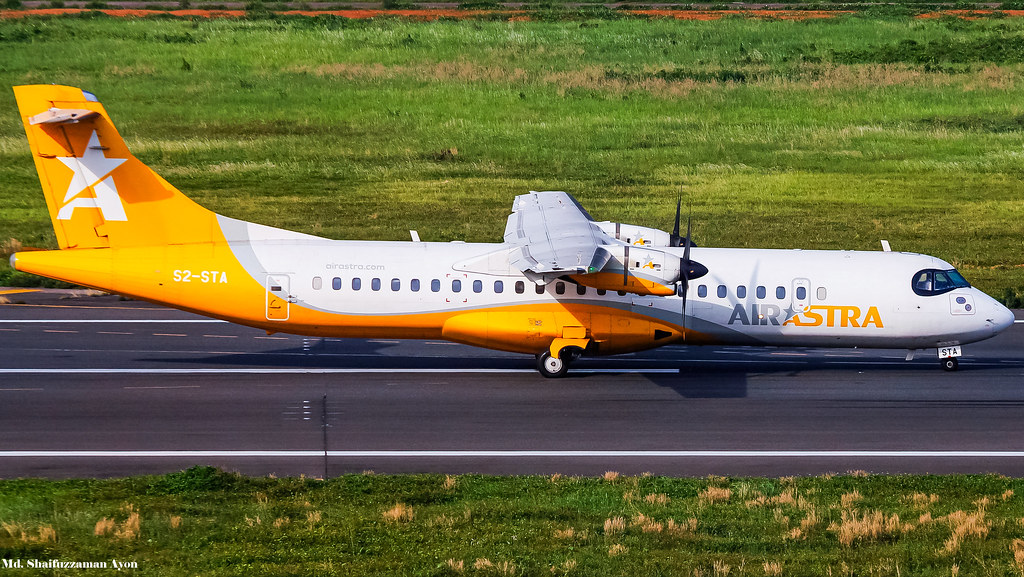
IATA	ICAO	Call sign
2A	AWA	Capella
- Founded: 2021; 5 years ago
- Commenced operations: 24 November 2022; 3 years ago
- Hubs: Hazrat Shahjalal International Airport
- Fleet size: 6
- Destinations: 5
- Parent company: Astra Airways Limited
- Headquarters: Dhaka, Bangladesh
- Key people: Imran Asif (CEO)
- Revenue: USD 10 Millions
- Website: www.airastra.com

Air Astra (Bengali: এয়ার অ্যাস্ট্রা) is a privately owned Bangladeshi airline based at Hazrat Shahjalal International Airport. The airline has its corporate headquarters at Siaam Tower in Uttara, Dhaka.

== History ==
The airline was expected to commence its operation in January 2022. However, the dates were pushed forward further into 2022 and after acquiring their air operator's certificate the airline was cleared to commence its operations. Air Astra, the first private airline to be introduced in Bangladesh since 2013, started its commercial operation on 24 November 2022, with Dhaka as its hub. The airline inaugurated its operation with daily three flights on Dhaka–Cox's Bazar–Dhaka route and three daily flights on Dhaka-Chittagong–Dhaka route. On 23 February 2023, the new airline launched Dhaka - Sylhet flight for first time. On 14 May 2024, Air Astra launched daily flights between Dhaka - Saidpur - Dhaka. As of November 2022, Air Astra operates 14 flights daily.

== Destinations ==
As of November 2024, Air Astra serves the following destinations:

Country	City	Airport	Notes	Refs
Bangladesh	Chattagram	Shah Amanat International Airport		
Bangladesh	Cox's Bazar	Cox's Bazar Airport		
Bangladesh	Dhaka	Shahjalal International Airport	Hub	
Bangladesh	Saidpur	Saidpur Airport		
Bangladesh	Sylhet	Osmani International Airport		

Air Astra

== Fleet ==
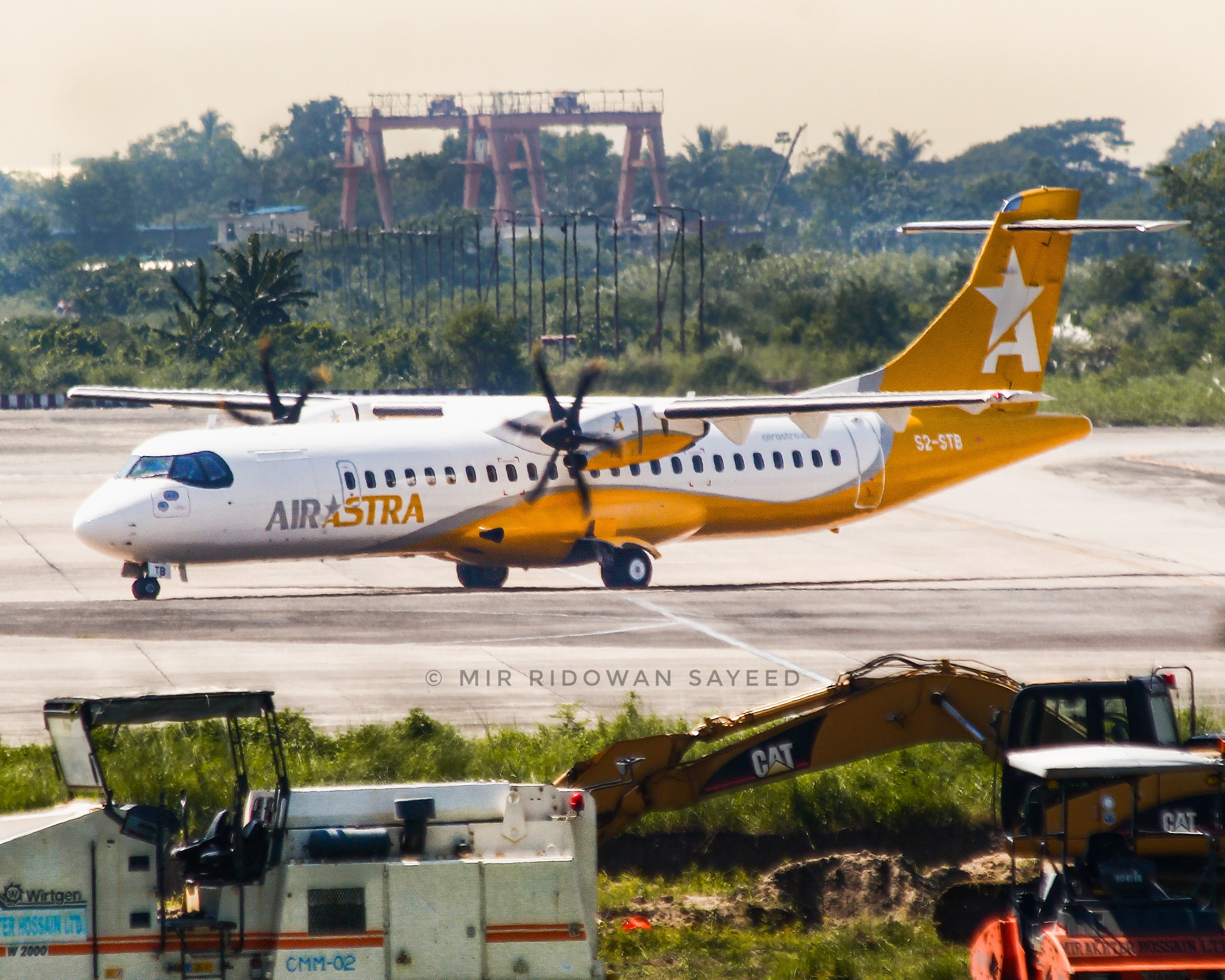
Air Astra ATR 72-600 at Shah Amanat International Airport in Chittagong

The airline started its commercial operation with two ATR 72-600s. On 18 January, Air Astra received another ATR 72-600 aircraft. The airline had planned to increase its fleet to 10 aircraft by 2025.

As of August 2025, Air Astra operates the following aircraft: Recently in August 2026 they have added one more ATR 72-600 aircraft, called ‘Echo’ in their fleet.

Air Astra fleet
Aircraft	In service	Orders	Passengers			Notes
Aircraft	In service	Orders	B	E	Total	Notes
ATR 72-600	6	4	–	70	70	
Airbus A320-200	-	3	–	-	-	Dry lease
Airbus A321-200	-	4	–	-	-	Dry lease
Boeing 737-800	-	1	-	-	-	Letter of Intent
Boeing 737 MAX 8	-	4	-	-	-	
Total	6	16				

== See also ==
- List of airlines of Bangladesh
- Transport in Bangladesh
