= Dhaka Post =

Bangla Online News Media in Dhaka

- Treaty with truth
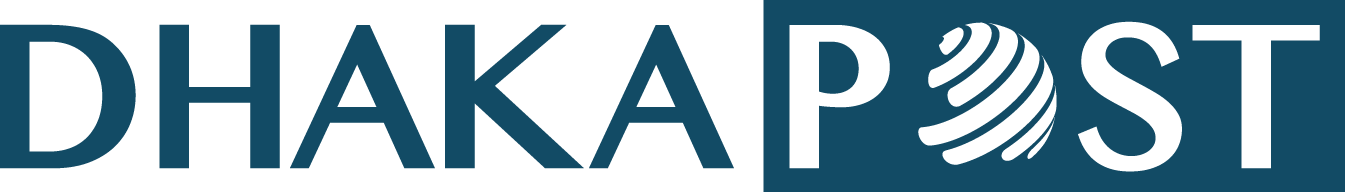
- Type: Online newspaper
- Format: Mobile & web
- Owner: Bijoy Bangla Media Limited
- Publisher: US Bangla Group
- Editor: Kamrul Islam (Acting)
- Founded: 16 February 2021; 5 years ago
- Language: Bengali; English
- Headquarters: 95 Suhrawardy Avenue Baridhara Diplomatic Zone
- City: Dhaka 1212
- Country: Bangladesh
- Website: www.dhakapost.com

Dhaka Post (Bengali: ঢাকা পোস্ট) is a Bengali and English language online news portal in Bangladesh. Launched on 16 February 2021, As of December 2021, Alexa ranked the website 3,479 worldwide and sixth in Bangladesh which is the second among the News websites and first position Internet-based newspaper in Bangladesh.

== History ==
Dhaka Post is owned by The Bijoy Bangla Media Limited (BBML) is a sister concern of the US Bangla Group of Companies. It officially launched on 16 February 2021 with the slogan `Treaty with the truth'. Mohiuddin Sarker is editor. He is former Acting Editor of Jagonews24.com. The portal has started the multimedia journalism and podcast at starting time. English daily Dhaka Tribune published news To Dhaka post source.

In 2021, Dhaka Post achieved the DRU, Best reporting award for reporting on the series titled 'Dhaka University in its centenary'.

5 farmers in Bangladesh go to jail after falling into the 'trap of motivation' of fraudsters. On July 12, 2021, Dhaka Post's investigative report '5 farmers were hanged for talking about incentives' was discussed all over the country. The text and visual report of the media reveals how a gang sent 5 farmers to jail in a fake loan default case through bank fraud.

On 4 October 2021, that investigative report was later presented by the lawyers in the court and on 6 October the five farmers were released on bail in the Bangladesh High Court.

== Content, coverage and criticism ==
In August 2023, Rumor Scanner Bangladesh ranked Dhaka Post among the top places spreading misinformation in Bangladeshi media for publishing inaccurate information in the first six months of 2023. The report was based on 1,427 instances of misinformation dissemination it identified from reports of 176 media outlets in Bangladesh

== See also ==
- BBC Bangla
- Bangla Tribune
- The Daily Star (Bangladesh)
- Somoy TV
- Dhaka Tribune
