= True Aviation Flight 21 =

2016 aviation accident

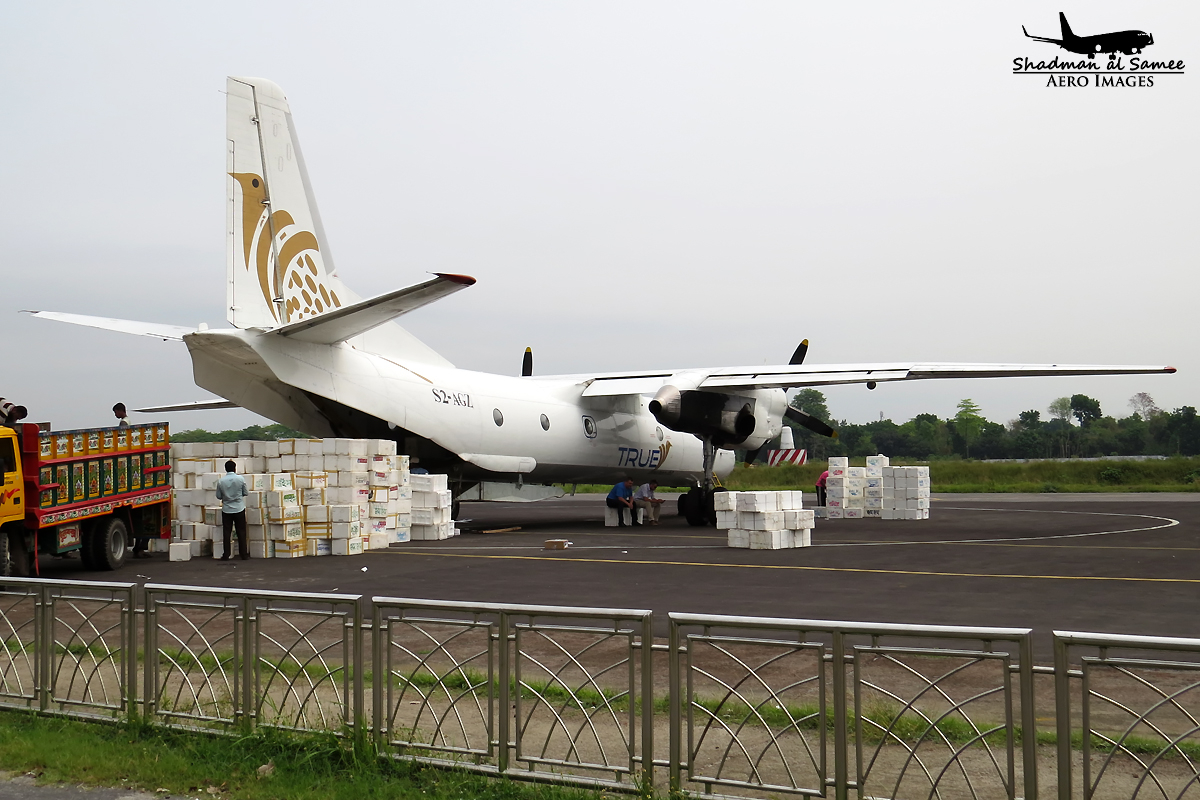
- S2-AGZ, the aircraft involved in the accident

Accident
- Date: 9 March 2016
- Summary: Engine failure on take-off and pilot error
- Site: 3 km (1.9 mi) off Cox's Bazar Airport, Bangladesh

Aircraft
- Aircraft type: Antonov An-26B
- Operator: True Aviation
- Call sign: ALPHA GOLF ZULU 21
- Registration: S2-AGZ
- Flight origin: Cox's Bazar Airport, Bangladesh
- Destination: Jessore Airport, Bangladesh
- Occupants: 4
- Crew: 4
- Fatalities: 3
- Injuries: 1
- Survivors: 1

True Aviation Flight 21 was a regularly scheduled domestic cargo flight in Bangladesh, flying from Cox's Bazar to Jashore. On 9 March 2016, the Antonov An-26 crashed into the Bay of Bengal shortly after take-off from Cox's Bazar Airport. The aircraft was attempting to return to the airport after experiencing an engine failure. Three of the four crew members on board were killed in the accident.

== Background ==
The flight was managed by True Blue Aviation. Ashek Ullah Rafique, a member from the Parliament of Cox's Bazar and member of the Awami League is one of the owners of the airline.

== Accident ==
On 9 March 2016, an Antonov An-26 owned by True Aviation and operating a cargo flight as Flight 21 was scheduled to fly from Cox's Bazar Airport to Jessore Airport. The cargo on board was 4,800 kg of shrimp fries.

At 02:58 UTC, according to the ATC, the crew requested the startup clearance, afterwards, the ATC controller informed the crew that the visibility at Jessore Airport was 3 km. The aircraft was cleared to taxi to runway 35 via taxiway S.

At 03:05 UTC, the aircraft requested takeoff clearance and was cleared to take-off a few moments later.

Immediately after the aircraft was airborne, the pilots informed the tower that they were experiencing an engine failure, without initially reporting which one of the two engines was failing. The pilots later confirmed that the left-hand engine had failed, which led the pilot to request an immediate return to Cox's Bazar Airport.

The air traffic controller advised the pilot to call for a left-hand downwind approach, but instead the pilot made a right-hand downwind approach at a very low altitude.

All emergency service vehicles were put on standby by the controllers. The aircraft was on final approach when it requested clearance for an emergency landing, but for unknown reasons at the time of the final report, the aircraft initiated a go-around at a low altitude. According to the flight controller, the plane was flying at an altitude between 400 and 500 ft; this was also confirmed by the surviving flight navigator.

The ATC repeatedly kept calling the aircraft to advise the left-hand downwind approach, but there was no response from the crew, and communication with the aircraft was lost.

At 03:32 UTC, the airport authorities were told that the aircraft had crashed approximately 3 kilometers west of the airport, in the Bay of Bengal.

A rescue operation involving the Bangladeshi Navy, Coast Guard, and fire service was immediately initiated by airport authorities, and the crew were found to have been located by local fisherman. Three crew members were declared dead at the scene; the causes of death for all 3 were later determined to be head trauma upon impact. The fourth crew member was rushed to the district hospital in Cox's Bazar and was later moved to Dhaka for treatment of his injuries. The aircraft was totally destroyed.

== Aircraft and crew ==
=== Aircraft ===
The aircraft involved was an Antonov An-26, which entered service on 15 February 1984. On 17 July 2014, the aircraft entered service in Bangladesh. The aircraft was powered by two Ivchenko Al-24 turboprop engines. The aircraft had accumulated 16,379 hours of flight time at the time of the accident.

The aircraft was owned by Air Urga and was on lease to True Aviation.

=== Crew ===
The crew consisted of four pilots, all of whom were Ukrainian nationals. Three of the four crew members were killed, whilst one survived.

The dead were:

- 57-year-old Captain Murad Gafarov, who had 13,315 total flight hours, including 6,896 hours on the An-26.
- 27-year-old Co-pilot Ivan Petrov, who had 1,438 total flight hours, including 1,195 hours on the An-26.
- 36-year-old Flight Engineer Kulish Andriy, who had 3,924 total hours, including 2,946 hours on the An-26.

The survivor was:

- 48-year-old Flight Navigator Vlodymyr Kultanov, who had 3,924 total hours, including 2,946 hours on the An-26.

== Investigation ==
The Air Accident Investigation Group of Bangladesh, or AAIG-BD, opened an investigation into the accident on the same day it occurred. Since the crew members were Ukrainian, the National Bureau of Air Accidents Investigation of Ukraine assisted in the investigation. Ukrainian members of the accident investigation team visited the crash site between 21 and 26 March 2016.

On the same day as the accident, the flight data recorder and the cockpit voice recorder were recovered. Both recorders, manufactured in Ukraine, showed no external signs of damage.

On 11 April, both recorders were sent to the headquarters of the National Bureau of Air Accidents Investigation of Ukraine in Kyiv to be inspected. According to the NBAAI analysis of both recorders, the cockpit voice recorder could not be read due to the internal damage suffered, but the flight data recorder was in good condition; therefore, a readout of the recorder was possible.

The investigation found that the reason for engine failure was a drop in oil pressure in the torque meter system. The surviving crew member reported that the crew was having difficulty controlling the aircraft while attempting emergency landing approaches prior to the crash. The investigation determined that the weather conditions were fit for departure, the crew were appropriately skilled and were medically fit at the time of the accident, and the aircraft was airworthy.

The causes of the crash were determined to be:

- failure to follow standard procedures after the engine failure;
- failure to divert to an alternate airport only 50 km away (Chittagong Airport) with better visibility that could have assisted in carrying out a proper one engine precision approach landing;
- Failure to fly at the minimum clean configuration speed (290 km/h, vs this aircraft's speed of 225 km/h); and
- Aircraft stall while attempting to make a turn towards the side with the failed engine at low altitude.
