= Jashore Airport =

Domestic airport in Jashore, Bangladesh

Jashore Airport যশোর বিমানবন্দর
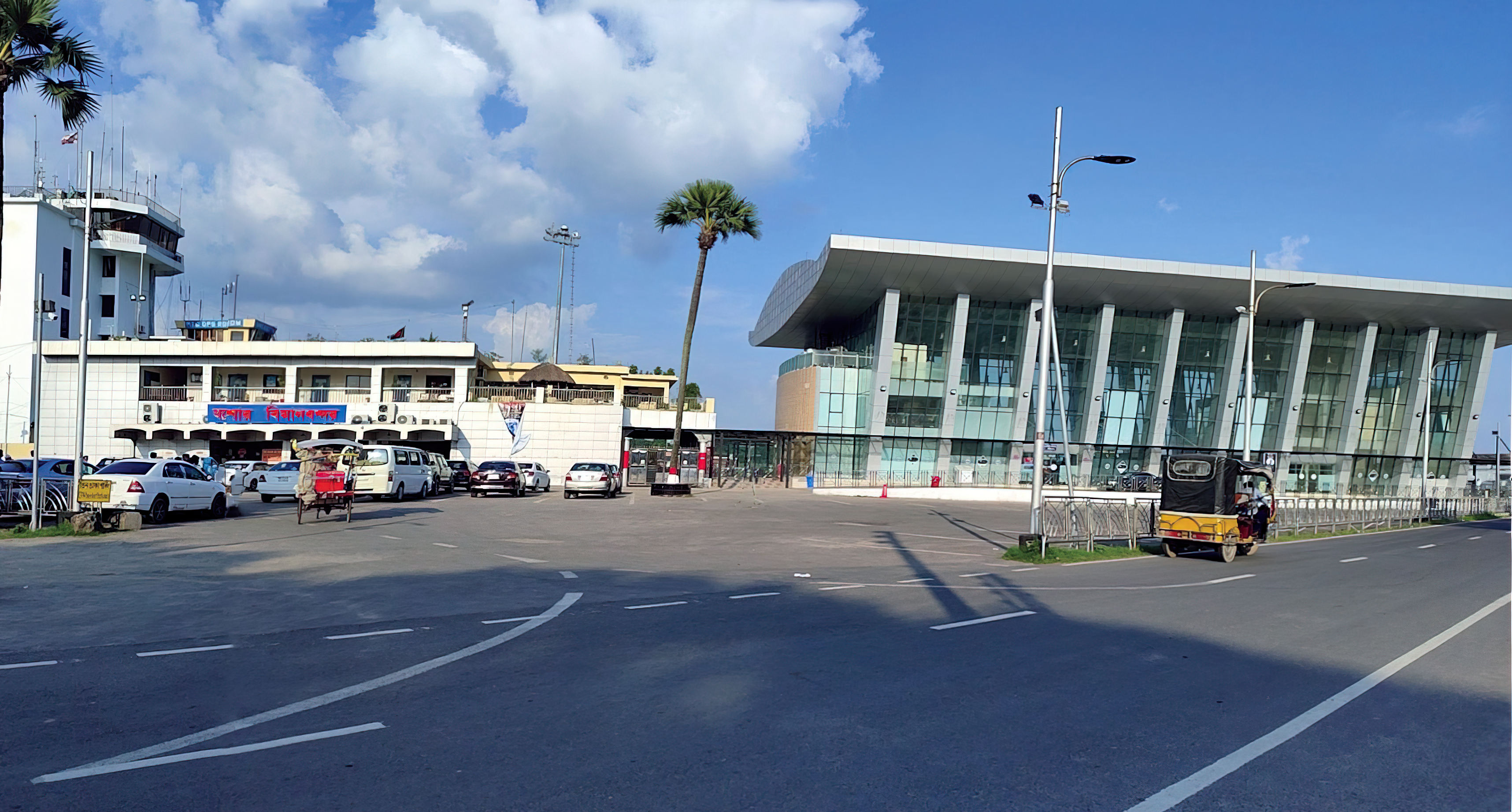
- IATA: JSR; ICAO: VGJR

Summary
- Airport type: Military & Public
- Owner: Ministry of Civil Aviation and Tourism
- Operator: Civil Aviation Authority of Bangladesh
- Serves: Jashore & Khulna
- Location: Arabpur, Jashore
- Opened: 1951 (75 years ago)
- Built: 1940 (86 years ago) as RAF Base, Jashore
- Elevation AMSL: 20 ft (6.1 m)
- Coordinates: 23°11′01″N 89°09′39″E
- Website: www.caab.gov.bd/airports/jessore.html

Map
- Location of airport in Bangladesh

Runways
Direction	Length		Surface
Direction	ft	m	Surface
16/34	8,000	2,438	Asphalt

Statistics (January 2023 – December 2023)
- Passengers: 1,75,596 ▼

Jashore Airport (IATA: JSR, ICAO: VGJR) is a domestic airport in Jashore, Bangladesh that is operated and maintained by the Civil Aviation Authority. It is also used by the Bangladesh Air Force as part of BAF Matiur Rahman Base and training airfield for the Bangladesh Air Force Academy. Currently, it has seven daily flights to Dhaka and a weekly flight to Cox's Bazar. It is the only operational airport of the Khulna Division and the fifth busiest airport of Bangladesh. The airport is located 6 km west of downtown Jashore.

== History ==
Jashore Airport was constructed by the Royal Air Force in 1940 to protect British India from Japanese aggression during World War II. When British India gained independence after World War II, the Government of Pakistan opened the airport as a base for the Pakistan Air Force. Later in 1951 Pakistan International Airlines started operating flights from Jashore to Dhaka, Karachi, Lahore and Chattogram. At that time they operated only two flights a week from Dhaka to Jashore. And from 1951 to March 1971, the airport was used jointly by Pakistan International Airlines and Pakistan Air Force. When the war of independence started in Bangladesh in March 1971, Pakistan Air Force started using it for conducting war activities. On 6 December 1971, a Joint force of the Indian Army and the Liberation Army invaded East Pakistan, causing extensive damage to the airport. And when the city of Jashore fell, the entire Jashore district, including the airport, came under the joint forces of the Indian Army and the Liberation Army. And the Indian Air Force compensates the airport and makes it usable. Later, when Bangladesh became independent in 1972, the Indian Air Force handed over to the Bangladesh Air Force and Biman Bangladesh Airlines resumed planes from Dhaka to Jashore.

=== Development ===
On 31 July 2023, a new terminal building, constructed at a cost of ৳32.89 crore (US$2.7 million), was inaugurated by the State Minister for Ministry of Civil Aviation and Tourism, Mahbub Ali. The new terminal building will be able to handle 1 million passengers per year and consists of eight check-in counters, five luggage scanning machines, five archways, VIP lounges, and car parking.

In order to make the airport meet international standards, another project worth ৳350 crore (US$29 million) has been taken to upgrade the runway.

== Airlines and destinations ==
=== Passenger ===
Airlines	Destinations	Refs.
Biman Bangladesh Airlines	Chattogram, Dhaka	
Novoair	Cox's Bazar, Dhaka	
US-Bangla Airlines	Chattogram, Cox's Bazar, Dhaka	

=== Cargo ===
Airlines	Destinations	Refs.
Easy Fly Express	Cox's Bazar	

== See also ==
- List of airports in Bangladesh
