= US-Bangla Airlines =

Bangladeshi airline

US-Bangla Airlines Ltd.

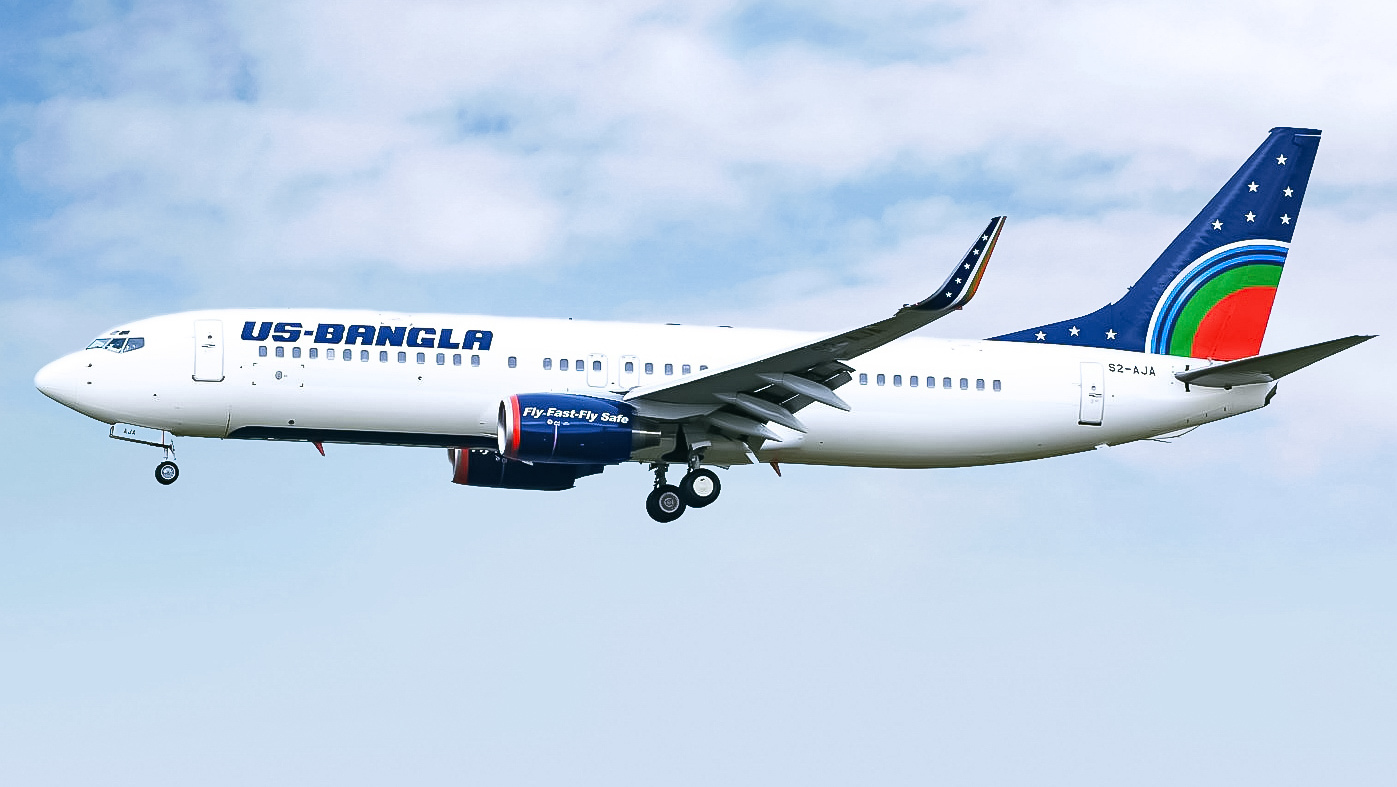
- US-Bangla Airlines 737-800
IATA	ICAO	Call sign
BS	UBG	BANGLASTAR
- Founded: 2010; 16 years ago
- Commenced operations: 17 July 2014; 12 years ago
- Hubs: Shahjalal International Airport
- Frequent-flyer program: Sky Star
- Fleet size: 16
- Destinations: 20
- Parent company: US-Bangla Airlines Ltd.
- Headquarters: Dhaka, Bangladesh
- Key people: Mohammed Abdullah Al Mamun, MD & CEO; Habibur Rahman Akand, CFO; Ghazi Mahmud Iqbal, Director Engineering
- Website: www.usbair.com

US-Bangla Airlines (Bengali: ইউএস বাংলা এয়ারলাইন্স) is the second largest airline in Bangladesh by fleet size. It is headquartered in Dhaka and based at Hazrat Shahjalal International Airport under the umbrella companies of US-Bangla Group.

== History ==
=== Foundation and early years ===
US-Bangla Airlines commenced operations with domestic flights on 17 July 2014. Initially, the airline launched two domestic destinations, Chittagong and Jessore, from its hub in Dhaka. Flights from Dhaka to Cox's Bazar were launched in August and to Saidpur in October.

In July 2016, the airline announced plans to phase in its first three Boeing 737-800 aircraft in September of the same year, and to subsequently launch international routes, for example to Singapore and Dubai. On 29 April 2019, the airline started flights to Guangzhou, becoming the first Bangladeshi airline to operate flights to China. The airline started flights from Dhaka to Chennai (via Chittagong) on 31 March 2019 also becoming first Bangladeshi airline carrier to operate flights to Southern India.

In February 2019, US-Bangla Airlines announced an order for four ATR 72-600 aircraft, to be used on domestic flights. On 22 March 2019, the first aircraft was delivered from Toulouse to Dhaka via El Dabaa and Muscat.

By September 2019, US-Bangla Airlines had become the second largest airline in terms of fleet size in Bangladesh, after the national flag carrier Biman Bangladesh Airlines.

=== Development since 2020 ===
The airline was supposed to start direct flights from Sylhet to other Bangladeshi cities such as Chittagong, Cox's Bazar and Jessore, as well as a flight from Chittagong to Jessore, in order to make the city of Sylhet more accessible, from mid-2020. It also announced plans to add four more international routes to Abu Dhabi, Colombo and Malé in the beginning of 2021. However, these plans were postponed as a result of the COVID-19 pandemic.

In November 2021, a senior authority expressed plans for expansion of both destinations and fleet, with the carrier willing to add seven new international routes, including Jeddah, Dammam, Medina, Riyadh, Sharjah, Abu Dhabi, Kuwait, Colombo, Sydney, New Delhi and Hyderabad from Dhaka. It was also considering introducing a Dhaka–New York service in the future, if Bangladesh earned Civil Aviation Category–I status. Subsequently, several European destinations — including London, Paris, Amsterdam and Rome — were planned to be introduced by 2024 with the newly acquired Airbus A330-300.

On 9 February 2024, the company received its first wide-body aircraft, an Airbus A330-300 leased from Hi Fly's Maltese division. The aircraft has 436 seats in an all-Economy class configuration, and another is planned to be acquired. These aircraft are intended to be used on routes to Middle Eastern cities, including those in Saudi Arabia, Kuwait and Bahrain, as well as for Hajj flights.

== Corporate affairs ==
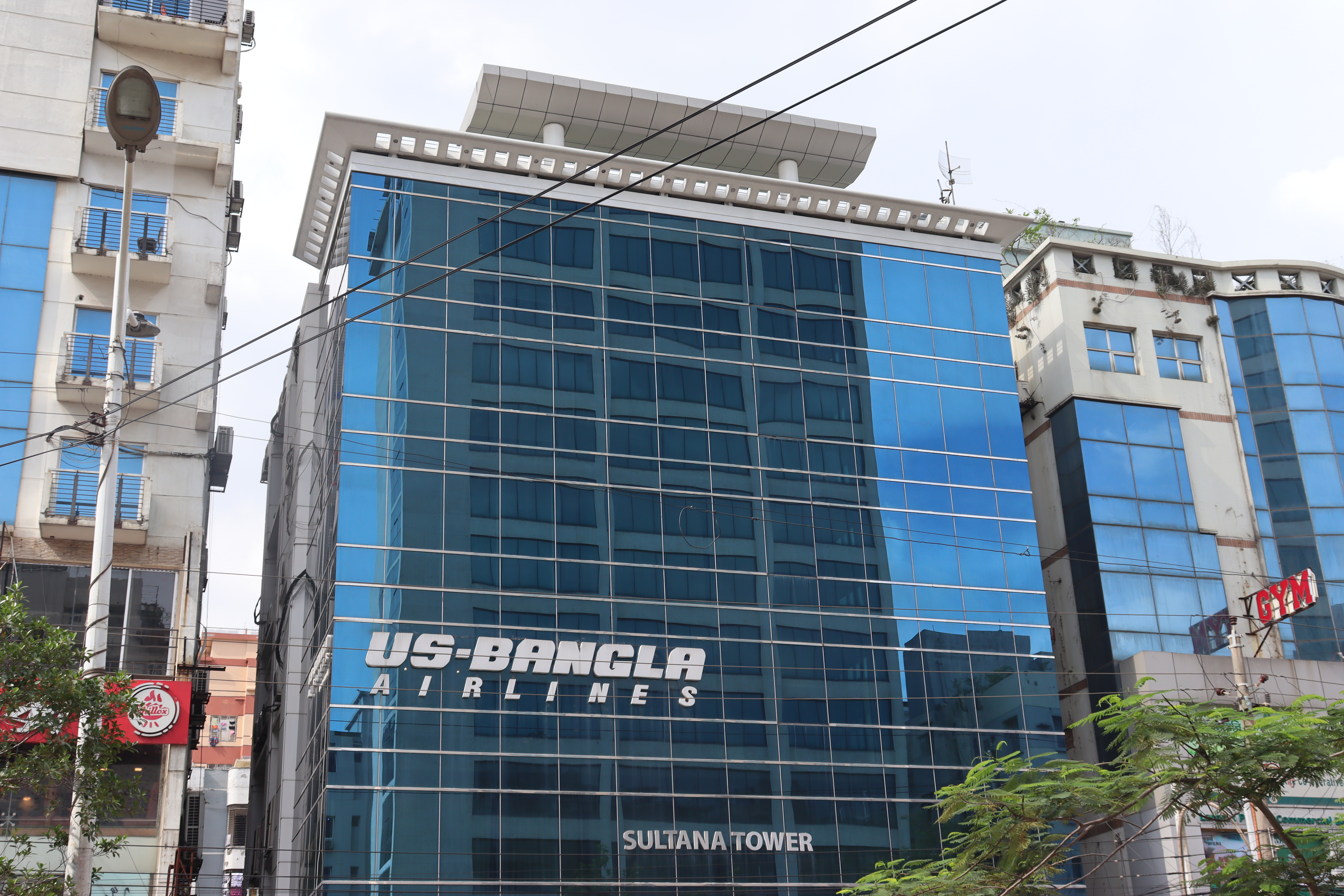
The branch office in Uttara, Dhaka

US-Bangla Airlines' headquarters are in the Baridhara Diplomatic Zone in Dhaka. Though the airline is the flagship company of the parent US-Bangla Group, the group owns numerous businesses in other industries such as real estate, education, media, electronics, and consumer foods.

It rebranded its current name from US-Bangla Assets in 2009. Its other notable business is real estate company US-Bangla asset which is developing Purbachal American City,. The group now owns educational businesses such as Green University of Bangladesh. and US-Bangla Medical College and Hospital. The group also owns a leather company in Bangladesh, US-Bangla Leather, which has not yet started its production. It also owns US-Bangla Hi-tech Industries which is also yet to set up. It has its footing in media businesses through US-Bangla Media and Communications, which was heavily criticized. It also owns food and grocery delivery system Foodi and e-commerce platform Cartup. They also own Dhaka Post.

== Destinations ==
As of July 2026, the Airline currently serves the following destinations:

Country	City	Airport	Notes	Refs
Bangladesh	Barisal	Barisal Airport	Terminated	
Bangladesh	Chittagong	Shah Amanat International Airport	Focus city	
Bangladesh	Cox's Bazar	Cox's Bazar Airport		
Bangladesh	Dhaka	Hazrat Shahjalal International Airport	Hub	
Bangladesh	Jessore	Jessore Airport		
Bangladesh	Rajshahi	Shah Makhdum Airport		
Bangladesh	Saidpur	Saidpur Airport		
Bangladesh	Sylhet	Osmani International Airport		
China	Guangzhou	Guangzhou Baiyun International Airport		
India	Chennai	Chennai International Airport		
India	Kolkata	Netaji Subhas Chandra Bose International Airport		
Malaysia	Kuala Lumpur	Kuala Lumpur International Airport		
Maldives	Malé	Velana International Airport		
Nepal	Kathmandu	Tribhuvan International Airport	Resume from September 2026	
Oman	Muscat	Muscat International Airport		
Qatar	Doha	Hamad International Airport		
Saudi Arabia	Jeddah	King Abdulaziz International Airport		
Saudi Arabia	Riyadh	King Khalid International Airport		
Singapore	Singapore	Changi Airport		
Thailand	Bangkok	Suvarnabhumi Airport		
United Arab Emirates	Abu Dhabi	Zayed International Airport		
United Arab Emirates	Dubai	Dubai International Airport		
United Arab Emirates	Sharjah	Sharjah International Airport		

== Fleet ==
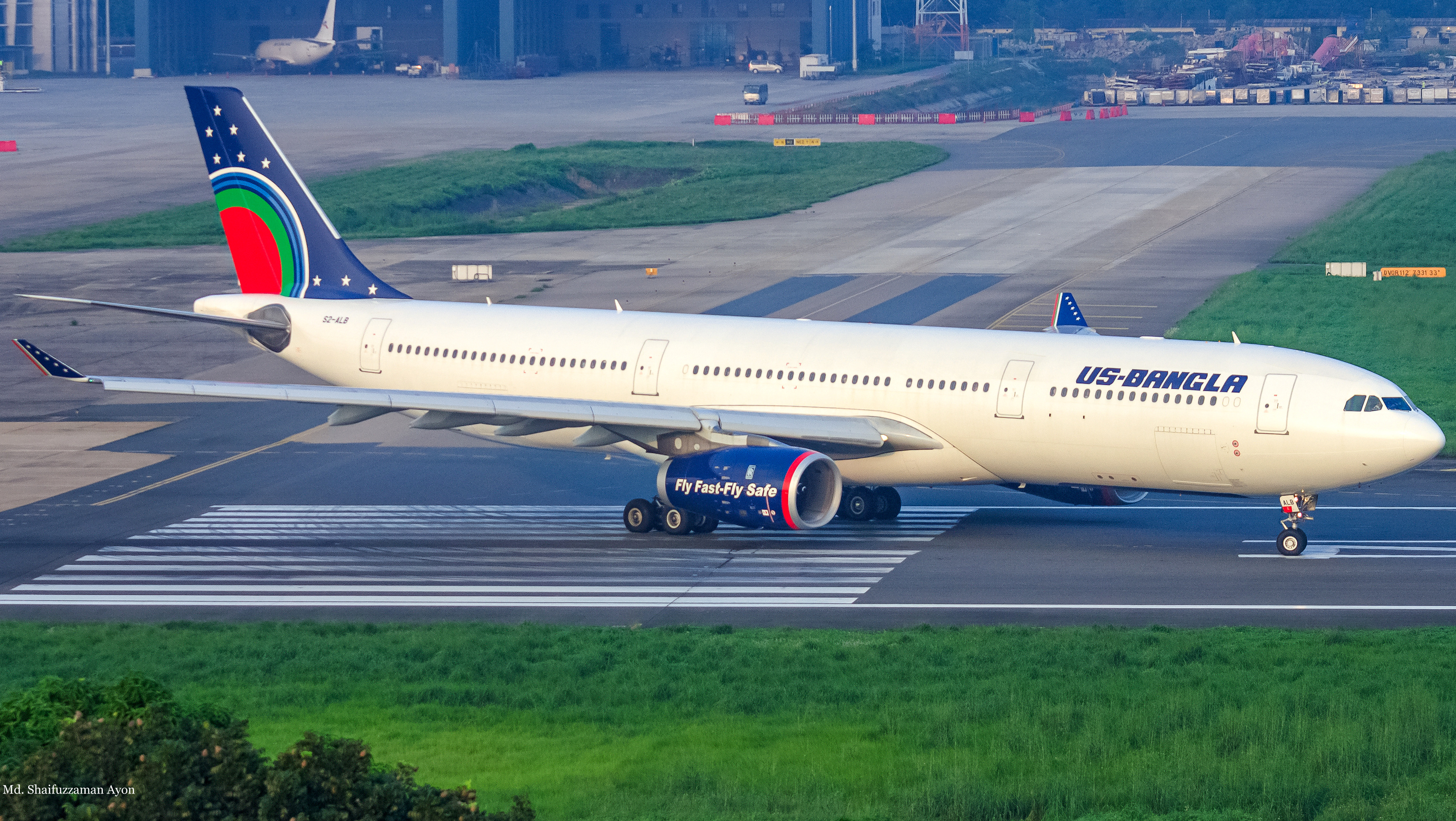
US-Bangla Airlines Airbus A330-300

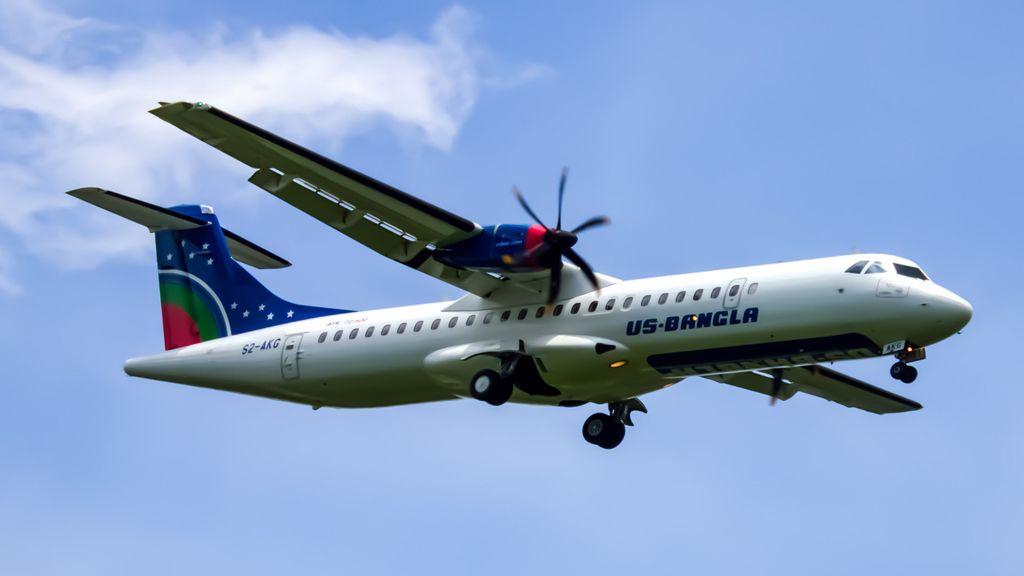
US-Bangla Airlines ATR 72-600

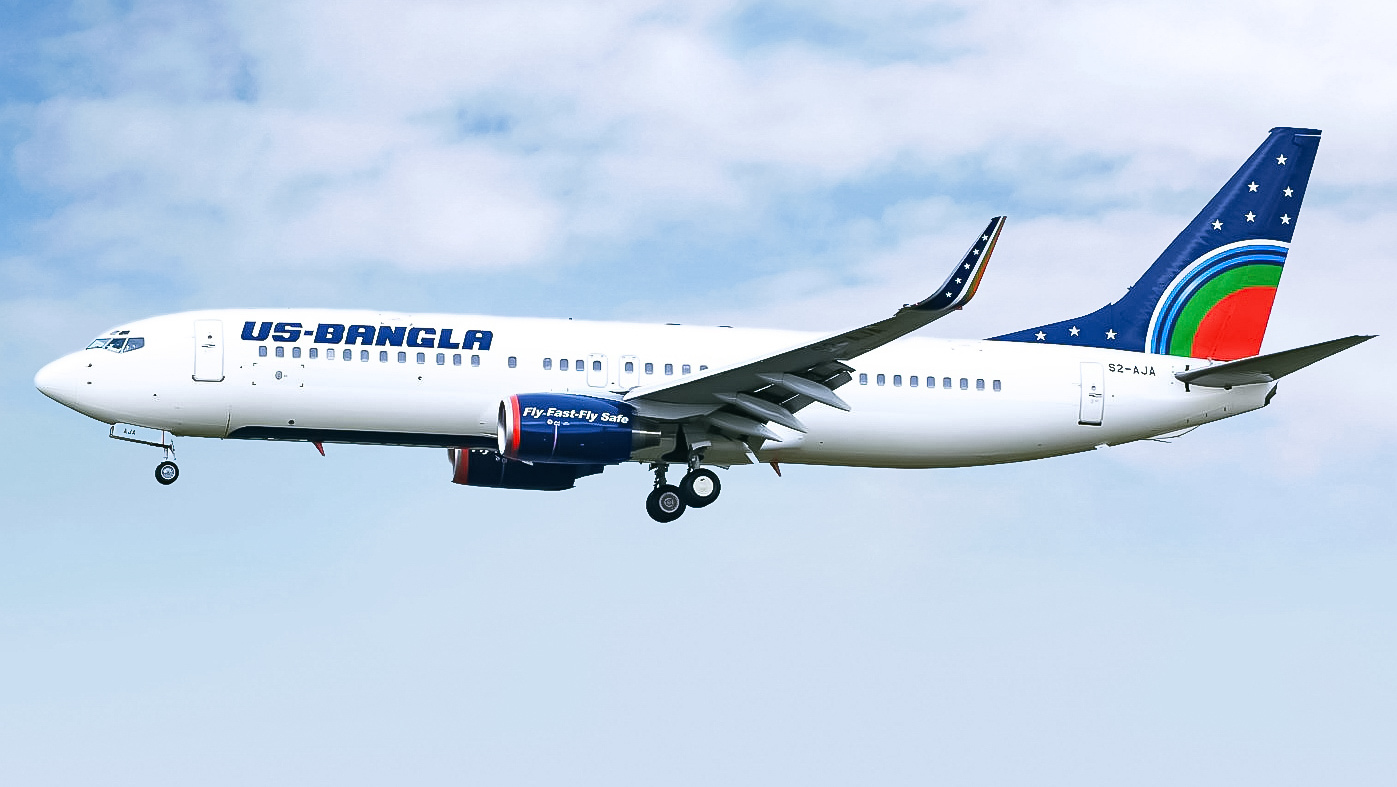
US-Bangla Airlines Boeing 737-800

=== Current fleet ===
As of August 2025, US-Bangla Airlines operates the following aircraft:

US-Bangla Airlines fleet
Aircraft	In service	Orders	Passengers	Notes / references
Airbus A330-300	3	—	436	Leased until 2029.
ATR 72-600	9	—	70	
ATR 72-600	9	—	78	
Boeing 737-800	4	6	189	
Boeing 737 MAX 8	—	15	TBA	
Total	16	21		

=== Former fleet ===
Aircraft	Total	Introduced	Retired	Notes
De Havilland Canada Dash 8	4	2014	2023	Registration Number S2-AGU crashed as flight BS211

== Accidents and incidents ==
- On 12 March 2018, US-Bangla Airlines Flight 211, a Bombardier Dash 8 Q400-402 with registration S2-AGU, crashed while landing at Tribhuvan International Airport, killing 51 of the 71 people on board. The final accident report, published on 27 January 2019, concluded "the probable cause of the accident is due to disorientation and a complete loss of situational awareness in the part of a crewmember".
- On 26 September 2018, US-Bangla Airlines Flight 141, a Boeing 737-800 with registration S2-AJA, took off from Dhaka airport at 11:30 am with 164 passengers and seven crew members on board. It was scheduled to land at the Cox's Bazar Airport at 12:30 pm. On approach to Cox's Bazar, the nose-wheel mechanism jammed and prevented the wheel hatch from opening. The pilot put the Boeing 737-800 into a holding pattern over Chittagong to burn off fuel so it would be lighter and the risk of fire on impact would be reduced. The plane eventually touched down at 1:18 pm. Some passengers received minor injuries as they attempted to disembark the aircraft hurriedly. This incident was similar to JetBlue Flight 292, which experienced a similar incident in the US in 2005.

== See also ==
- List of airlines of Bangladesh
- List of companies of Bangladesh
- Transport in Bangladesh
- Biman Bangladesh Airlines
