= Kurmitola Multicare Specialized Hospital =

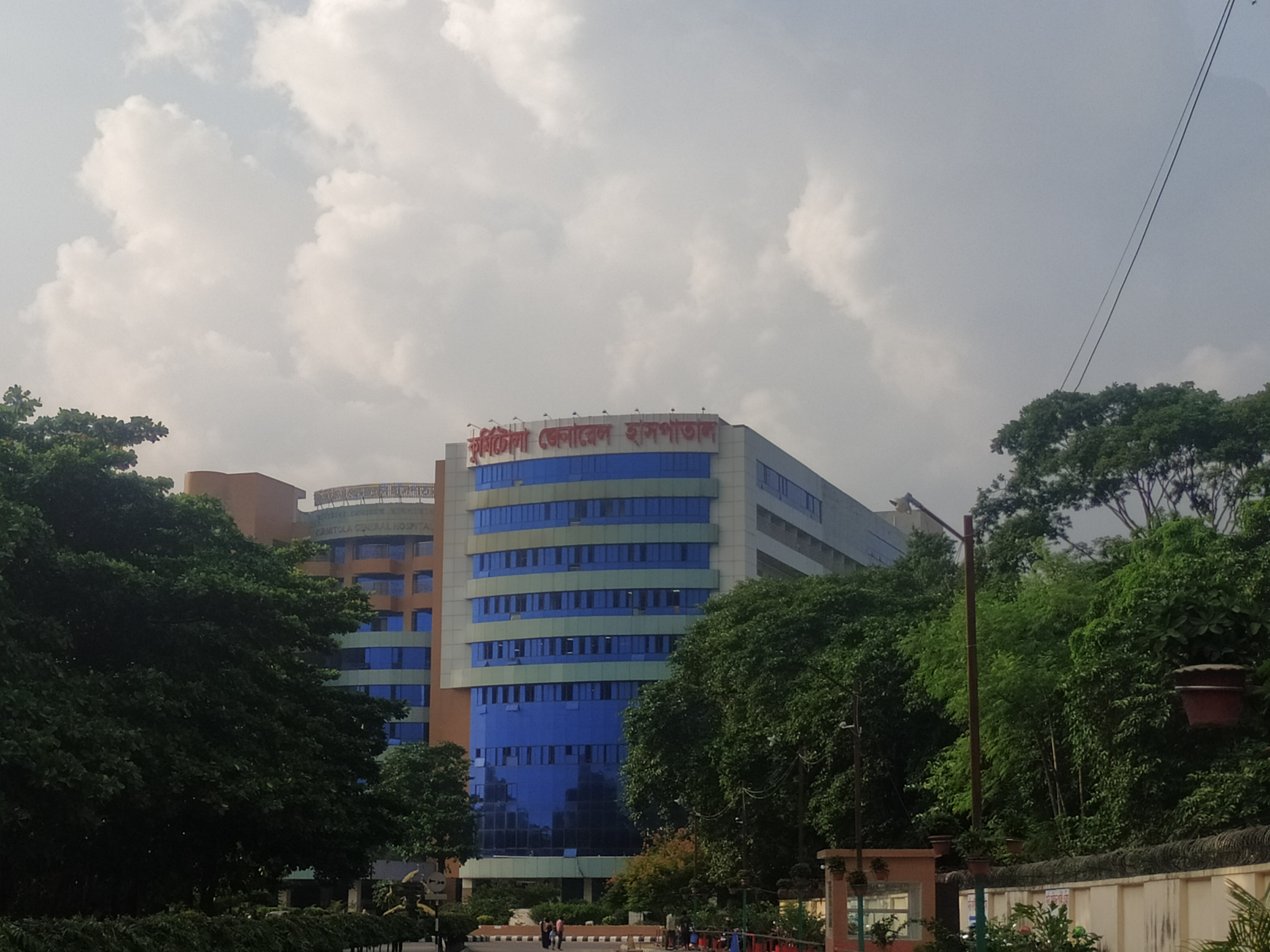

Geography
- Location: Kurmitola, Dhaka-1206
- Coordinates: 23.81944°N 90.40929°E

Organisation
- Care system: Government

History
- Founded: 13 May 2012; 14 years ago

Links
- Website: kgh.gov.bd

Kurmitola Multicare Specialized Hospital is a government hospital located in Kurmitola, Dhaka, Bangladesh.

== History ==
Construction of Kurmitola General Hospital began in 2004 and was completed in 2011. It was inaugurated on 13 May 2012 by the Prime Minister of Bangladesh, Sheikh Hasina. The hospital began offering inpatient services from 12 November 2012 and outpatient services from 16 June 2013. It is operated and funded by the government. The hospital was established to provide healthcare services to all citizens, emergency and lifesaving treatment to victims of road accidents in nearby areas, and "job training" and practical training for intern cadets of AFMC and AFMI. It functions as a teaching and training hospital for the Armed Forces Medical College.

== Services ==
This is a 500-bed hospital. It provides services in various departments including Medicine, Pediatric Medicine, Neonatology, Skin and VD, Nephrology, Cardiology, General Surgery, Orthopedic Surgery, ICU, Accident, Burn and Plastic Surgery.
