= Cox's Bazar Airport =

Domestic airport in Bangladesh

Cox's Bazar Airport কক্সবাজার বিমানবন্দর
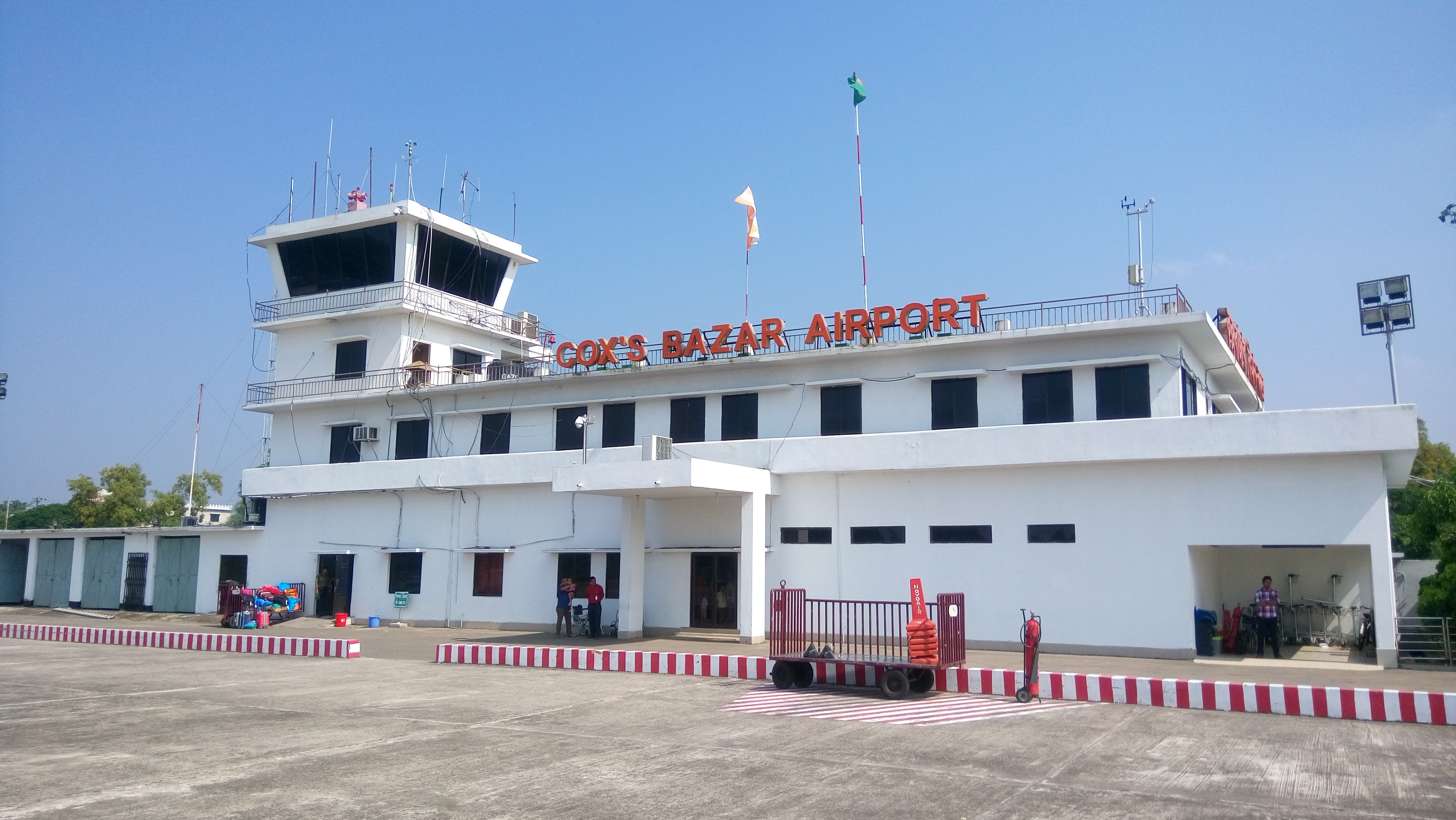
- IATA: CXB; ICAO: VGCB

Summary
- Airport type: Public
- Owner: People's Republic of Bangladesh
- Operator: Civil Aviation Authority of Bangladesh
- Serves: Cox's Bazar, Bangladesh
- Elevation AMSL: 12 ft (3.7 m)
- Coordinates: 21°27′07″N 091°57′50″E
- Website: www.caab.gov.bd

Map
- Location of airport in Bangladesh

Runways
Direction	Length		Surface
Direction	ft	m	Surface
17/35	10,700	3,200	Asphalt

Statistics (December 2024)
- Passengers: 48,719 ▲

Cox's Bazar Airport (Note: Bengali: কক্সবাজার বিমানবন্দর, romanized: Kôksbajar Antôrjatik Bimanbôndôr) (IATA: CXB, ICAO: VGCB) is an airport in Cox's Bazar, Bangladesh. The airport serves the residents of Cox's Bazar as well as tourists to the region. It became the country's fourth international airport on 13 October 2025, before its "international" status has been stripped on 24 October.

== History ==
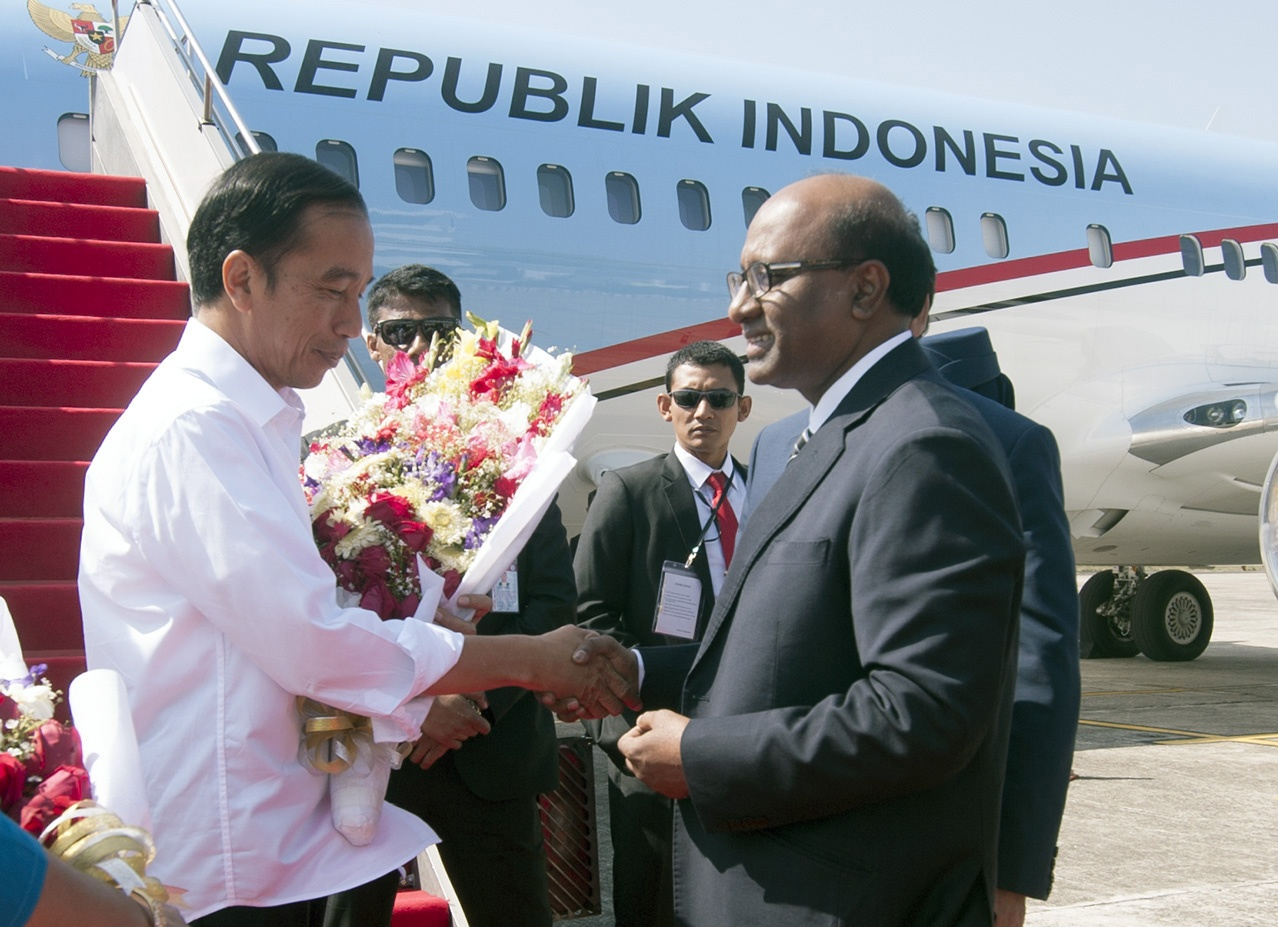
President of Indonesia Joko Widodo being welcomed at the Cox's Bazar Airport, 28 January 2018

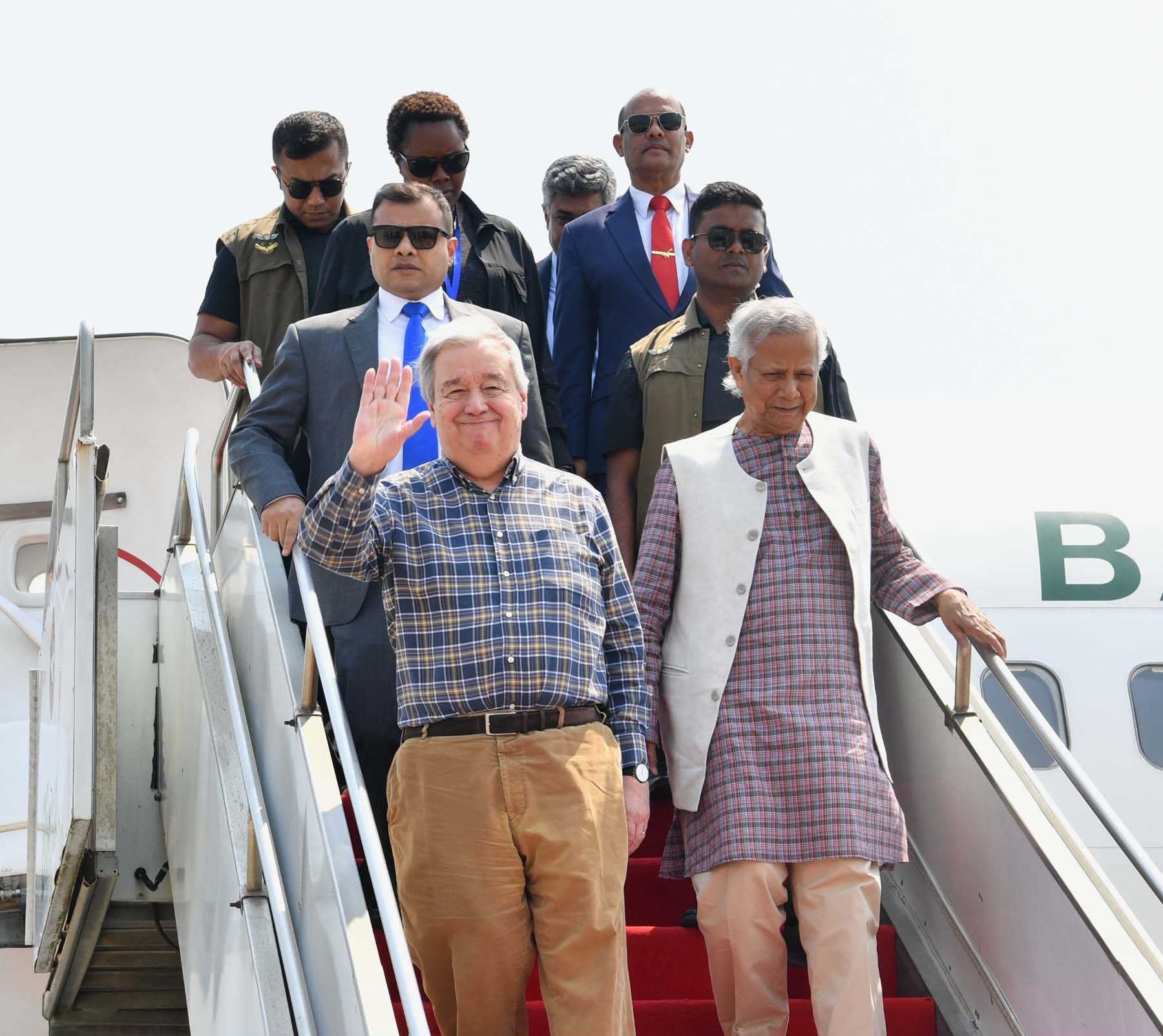
Secretary-General of the United Nations António Guterres and Chief Adviser of the interim government of Bangladesh Muhammad Yunus arrives at Cox's Bazar Airport, 14 March 2025

During World War II, the British Raj established an airfield near Cox's Bazar. It was converted into a domestic airport by the central government of Pakistan in 1956, seven years after the city was incorporated into the Pakistani province of East Bengal (later East Pakistan). The airport was damaged during the Bangladesh Liberation War and was renovated and reopened in 1972. According to civil aviation sources, in 2009, the government had planned to rapidly modernise the airport to accommodate fighter jets, if required.

=== Expansion and development ===
Plans to upgrade Cox's Bazar Airport into an international facility began in 2012. The development is being carried out in two phases, intended to improve aircraft handling capacity and accommodate wide-body planes. The upgrade's initial cost was ৳3 billion (US$24 million).

In the initial stage of construction, the runway was extended "6,775 feet to 9,000 feet in length and from 120 feet to 200 feet in width". Additionally, its load-bearing strength and lighting systems were upgraded, and "Doppler VHF Omni-direction Range and distance measurement equipment" were installed. Fueling services, under the operation of Standard Asiatic Oil Company Limited, a subsidiary of Bangladesh Petroleum Corporation, began in February 2017.

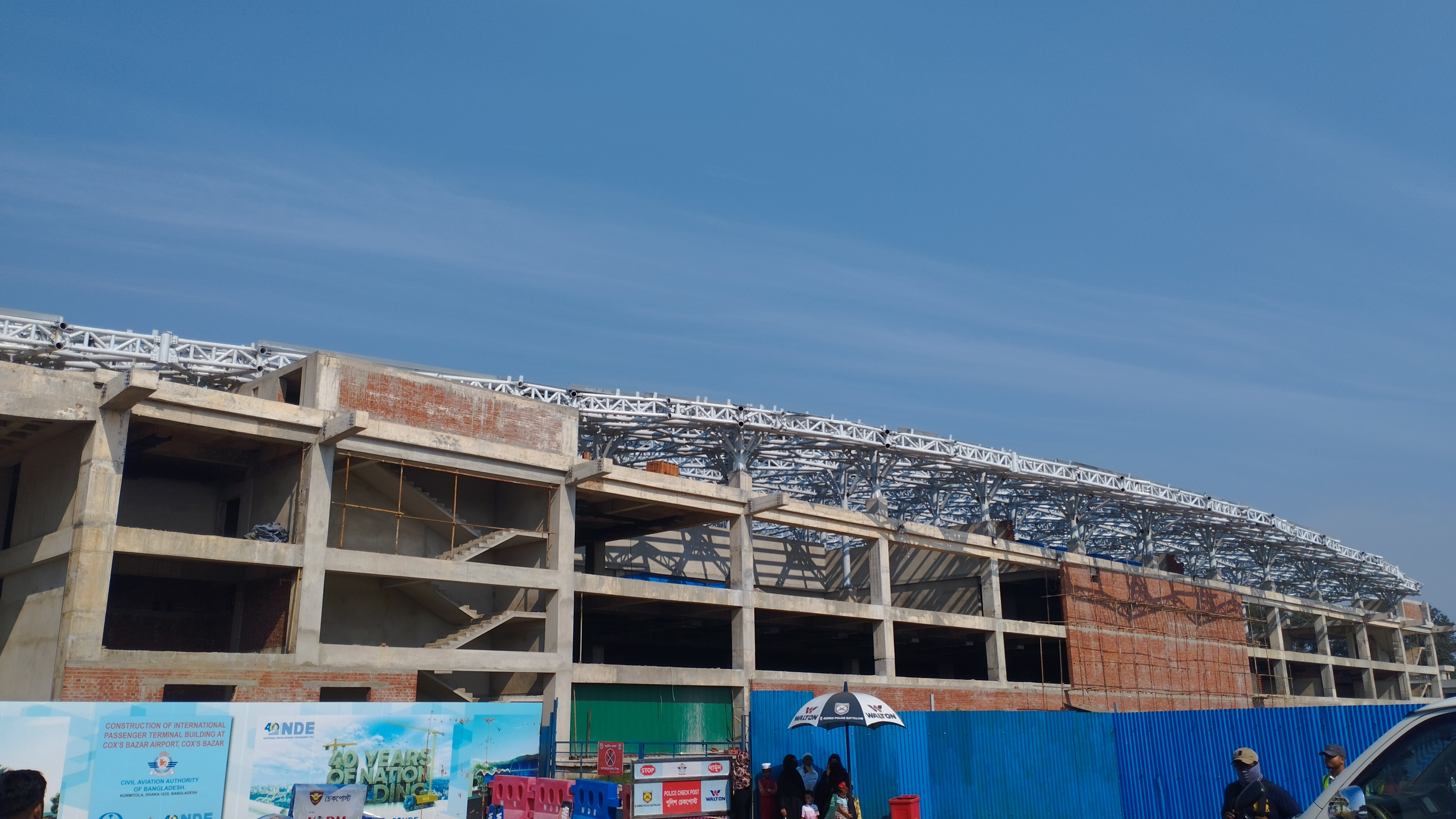
New international terminal under construction, 2023

The second phase of expansion involves adding another 1,700 feet to the runway. "Officials said a 1,300-foot stretch of the runway's expanded portion would be under the sea"; construction will add "blocks in the sea" which is the first time this technique will be used in Bangladesh.

On 13 October 2025, the Ministry of Civil Aviation and Tourism issued a notification declaring the airport as an international airport. Eleven days later, on 24 October, the government suspended the gazette that declared the airport as an international one before its first flight took off due to local and foreign airlines showing no interest in launching flights to Cox's Bazar, finding them commercially unviable.

== Airlines and destinations ==
=== Passenger ===
Airlines	Destinations
Air Astra	Dhaka
Biman Bangladesh Airlines	Dhaka
Novoair	Dhaka
US-Bangla Airlines	Dhaka

== Incidents and accidents ==
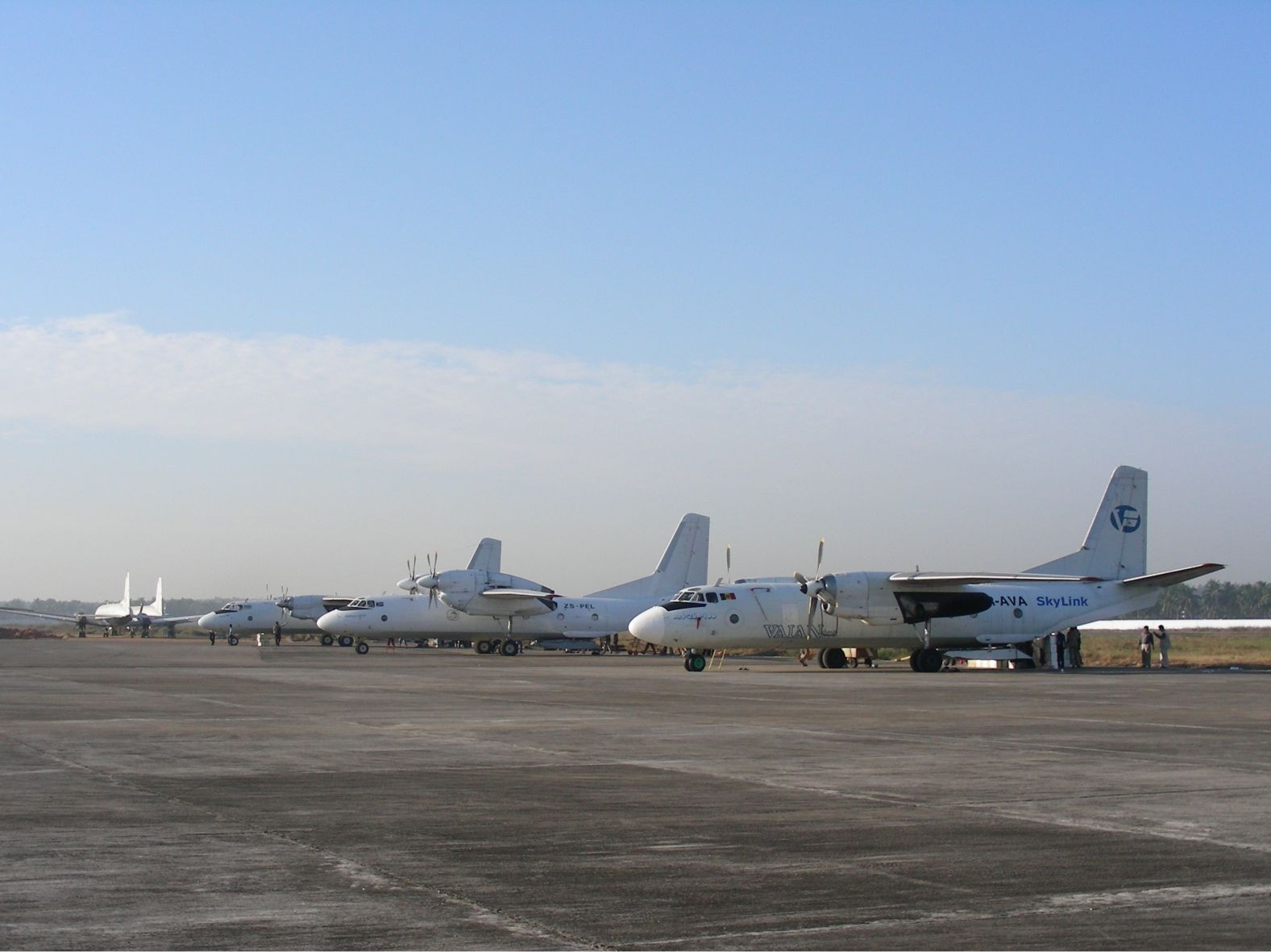
Antonov An-26 cargo aircraft on the airport runway, 2011

- On 9 March 2016, an Antonov An-26 of True Aviation crashed into the Bay of Bengal shortly after take-off.

== See also ==
- List of airports in Bangladesh
