= Transport in Bangladesh =

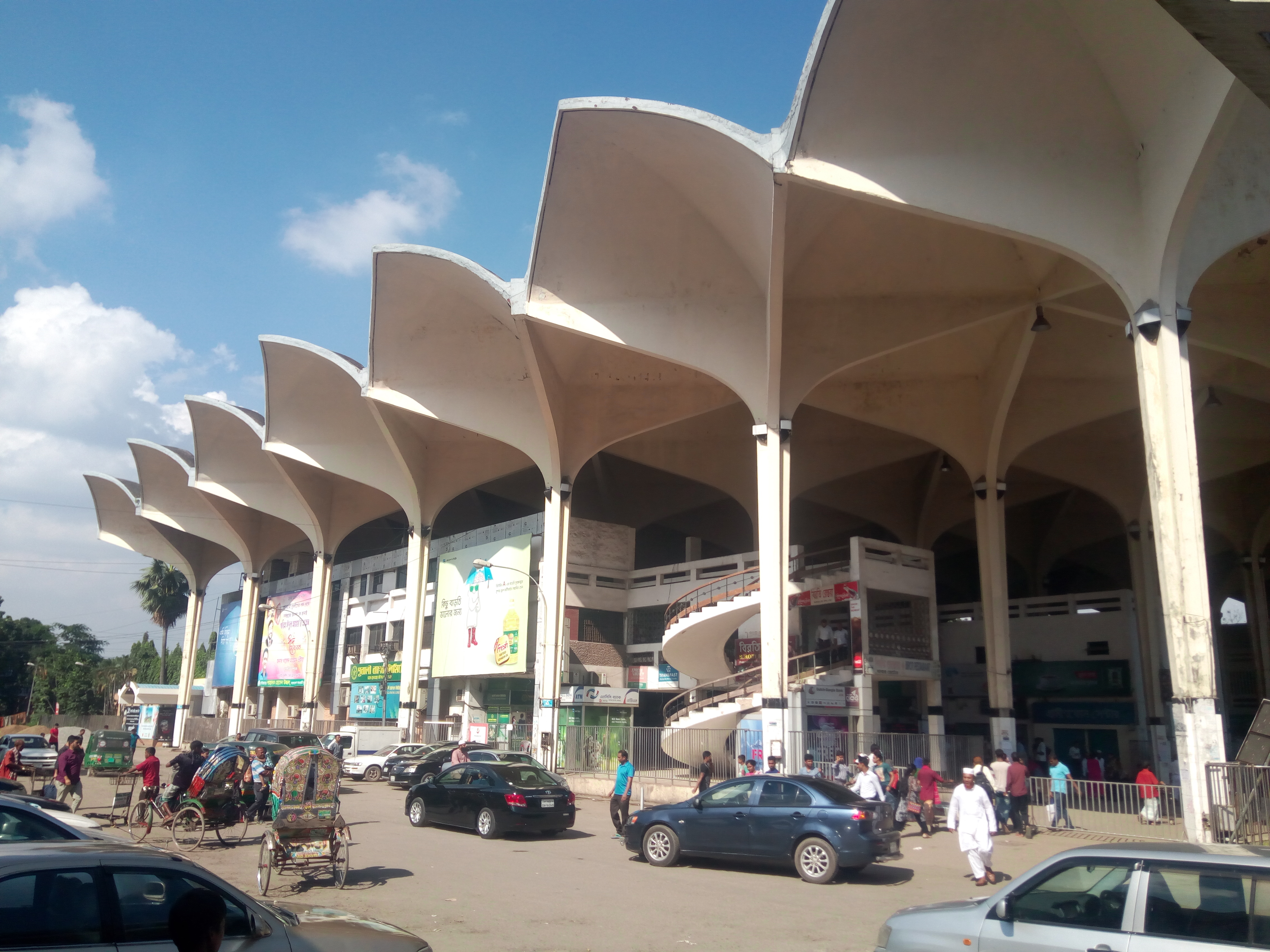
Kamalapur Railway Station

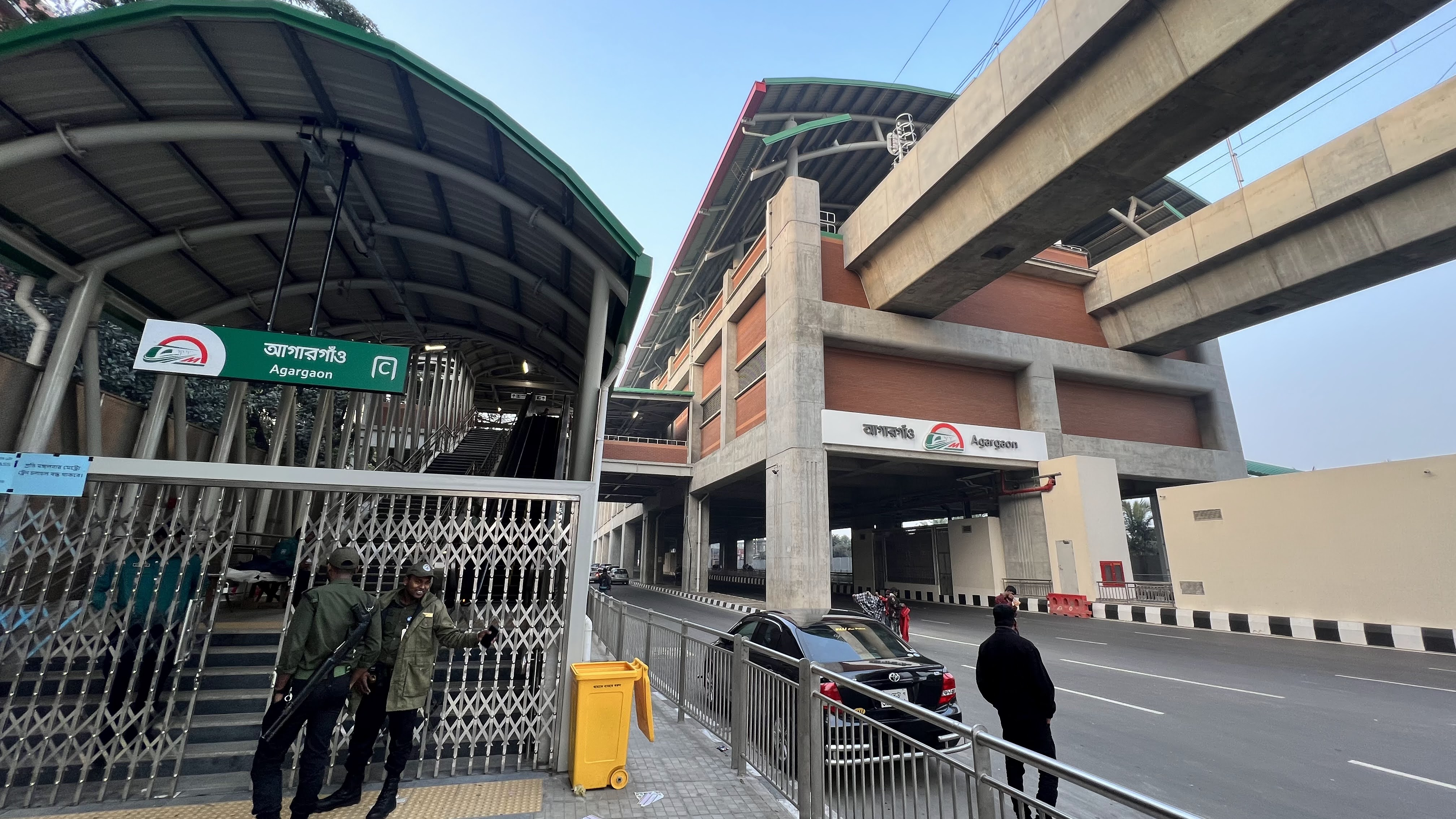
Agargaon Metrorail Station

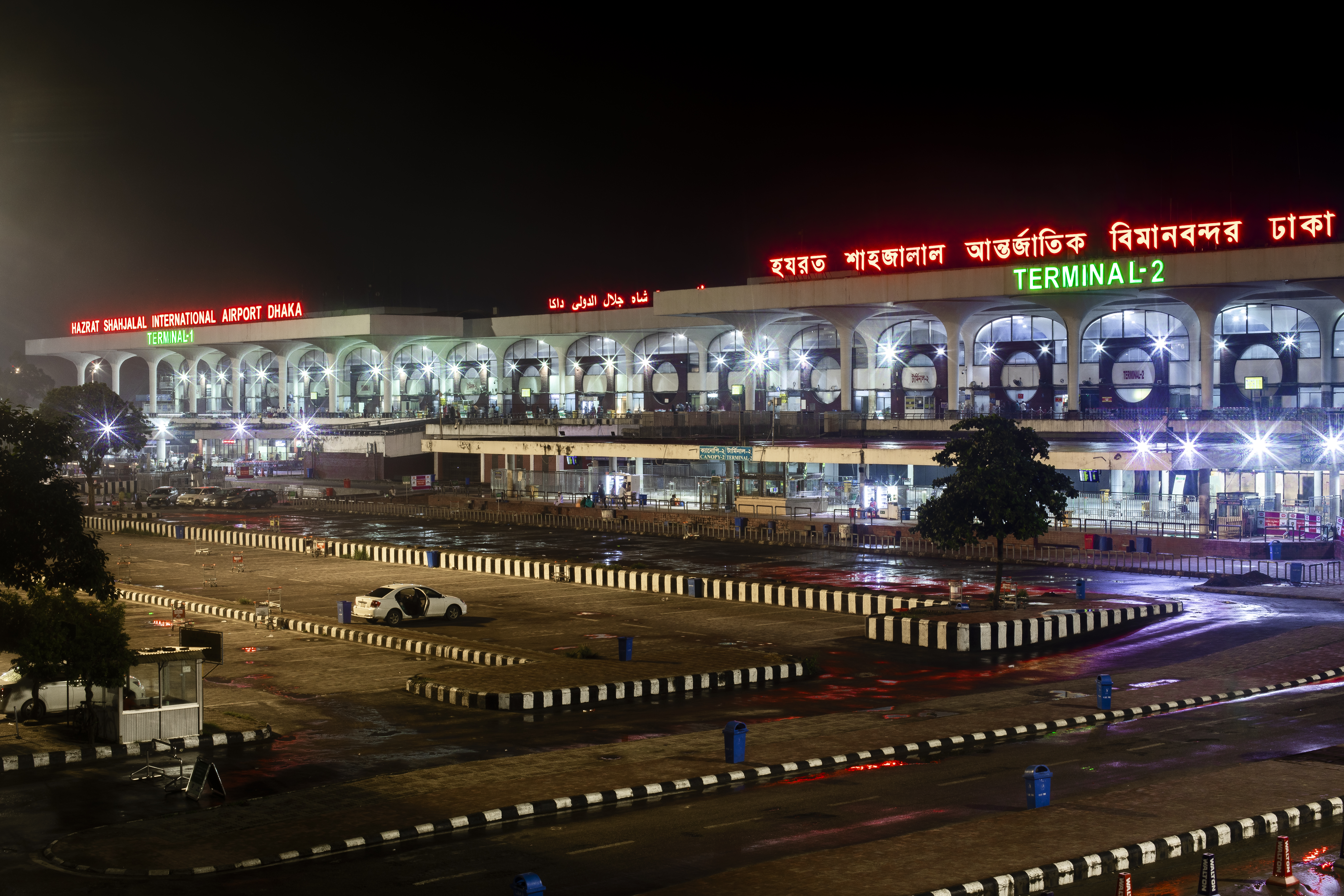
Hazrat Shahjalal International Airport.jpg

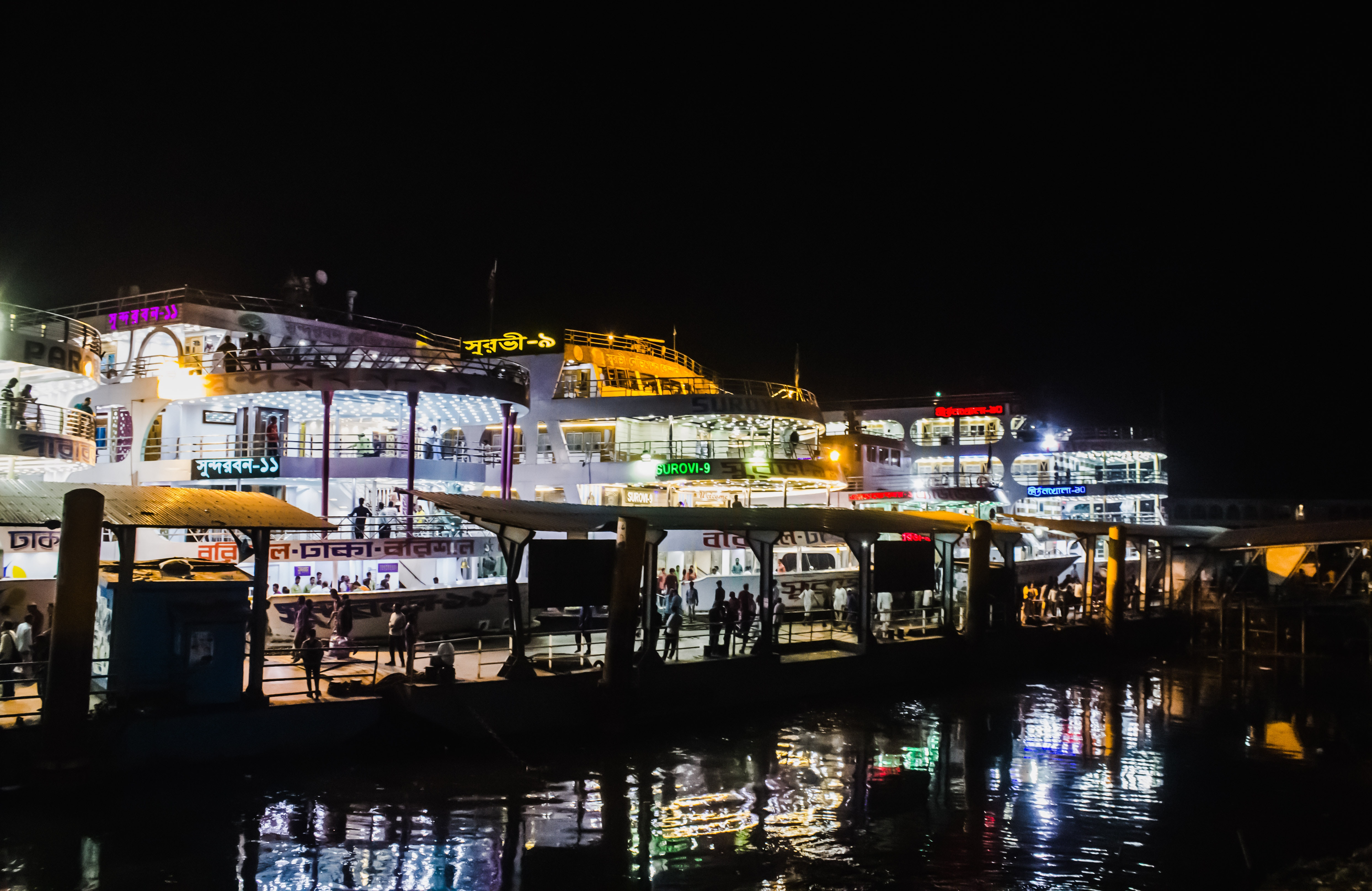
Sadarghat Launch Terminal

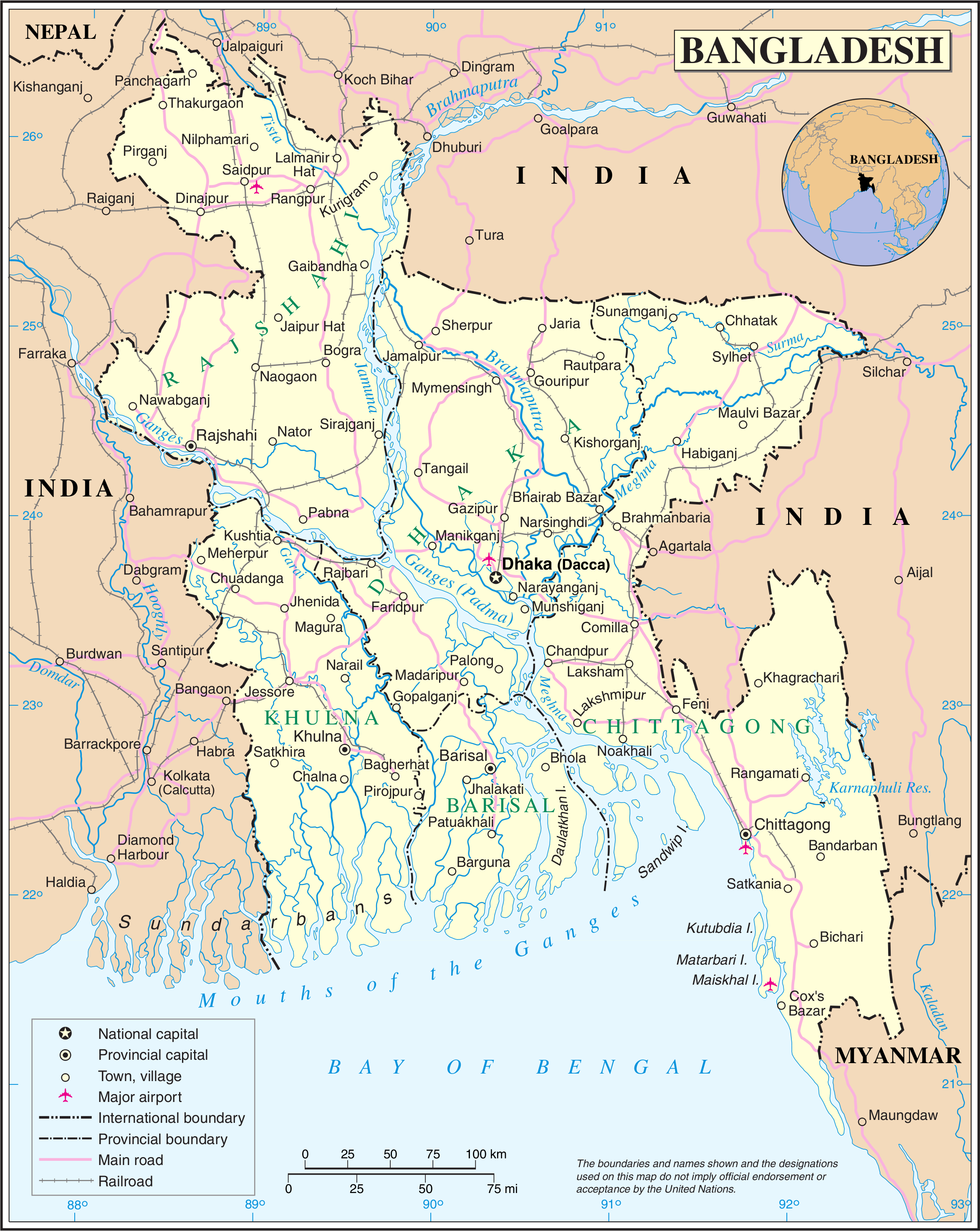
Transport map of Bangladesh

Transport in Bangladesh is dominated by roadways, accounting for the majority of both passenger and cargo traffic due to substantial development efforts since independence. Eight major national highways connect the capital, Dhaka, with divisional and district headquarters, port cities, and international routes. Despite this, vehicle usage per capita remains low, with non-motorised modes prevailing. However, Bangladesh's roads are unsafe, having one of the highest road accident fatality rates. They also suffer from high congestion, as well as severe air and noise pollution.

The share of railway traffic has seen a significant decline since 1975, facing challenges like shortage of rolling stock and poor track conditions. Transportation through inland waterways, though also declining, remains popular thanks to Bangladesh's extensive river network and the use of ferries.

Air travel in Bangladesh is supported by three international and five domestic airports, of which Hazrat Shahjalal is the largest and busiest. Biman Bangladesh, the national airline, and the privately owned US-Bangla are the two international carriers based in Bangladesh, which also operate domestic flights to these airports alongside three other private airlines.

In 2023, Bangladesh ranked 88 in the Logistics Performance Index among 139 countries and third among South Asian countries, after India and Sri Lanka.

== Road ==
With around 370,000 km (230,000 mi) of roads, Bangladesh ranks 16th in the world for total length of road network. It has the highest road density in South Asia after India and ranks 13th globally. However, only about 30 per cent, or 110,311 km (68,544 mi), of these roads are paved. The network maintained by the Roads and Highways Department—the government agency responsible for the construction and upkeep of the country's major road and bridge network—includes approximately 4,000 km (2,500 mi) of national highways, 5,000 km (3,100 mi) of regional highways, and 13,500 km (8,400 mi) of district (zila) roads.

As of January 2024, there were 410,532 private passenger cars, 121,387 microbuses, and 4.34 million motorcycles — bringing the total number of vehicles, including those mentioned, to nearly 6 million. In addition, there were around 4 million unregistered electric auto rickshaws circulating in Bangladesh by 2025. These so-called "Bangla Teslas" dominate local transport and constitute "perhaps the world's biggest informal EV fleet."

=== Highways ===
There are eight major national highways, linking the capital with various divisional and district headquarters, port cities, and international routes. The Dhaka–Chittagong highway (N1) is regarded as the lifeline of the country's trade and commerce, connecting the capital, Dhaka, with the primary port city of Chittagong. The Dhaka–Mawa–Bhanga Expressway, opened in 2020, is the first controlled-access highway in the country.

Three Asian Highway routes pass through Bangladesh, with parts of the network undergoing upgrades to meet international standards. The routes are:

- AH1: Tamabil to Benapole (492 kilometres (306 mi)), connecting to India at both ends.
- AH2: Tamabil to Banglabandha (517 kilometres (321 mi)), also connecting to India at both ends.
- AH41: Teknaf to Mongla (762 kilometres (473 mi)), with potential for extension to Myanmar.

=== Usage ===
Although road transport usage has risen significantly compared to rail and inland waterways since 1975, the rate of vehicle usage remains notably low, with only 7.89 vehicles and 4.22 passenger cars per 1,000 people. There are nearly 4.3 million motorcycles, 714 thousand passenger cars, and 86.5 thousand buses, collectively covering 140.7 billion passenger-kilometres in 2021, and accounting for 88 per cent of passenger traffic in 2005. This marks a significant increase from the 9.2 billion passenger-kilometres recorded in 1975, which accounted for 54 per cent of passenger traffic. Additionally, approximately 535,000 vans, pickups, lorries, and tractors are actively used, transporting 80 per cent of cargo in 2005 and covering 137.2 billion tonne-kilometres in 2021, a sharp increase from 900 million tonne-kilometres, comprising 35 per cent of cargo traffic, in 1975.

Despite significant growth in the number of motor vehicles, Bangladesh's transportation demand continues to be predominantly met by non-motorised modes, especially walking and rickshaws. The level of motorisation in the country remains considerably lower compared to many other nations.

=== Issues ===
==== Safety ====
Bangladesh has one of the highest road accident fatality rates globally, with estimates from non-governmental sources reaching as high as 25,000 deaths in 2019, although official government figures are much lower. The annual road crash deaths per capita in Bangladesh are twice the average rate for high-income countries and five times that of the best-performing countries worldwide. Buses and trucks are identified as the primary contributors to traffic accidents, with pedestrian casualties being particularly common. Major contributing factors include a mix of diverse traffic, inadequate enforcement of laws, poor road conditions, and a lack of formal training and education.

Road safety concerns have sparked significant movements, such as Nirapad Sarak Chai, and mass protests, primarily led by students. A notable instance was the major 2018 road safety protests, when tens of thousands of schoolchildren in Dhaka and nearby cities protested following the deaths of two students caused by a speeding bus. In response to these events, the government passed the Road Transport Act in September 2018, despite opposition from transport workers. The act aimed to enhance road safety by increasing fines for traffic violations, imposing stricter licensing requirements, and introducing harsher penalties, including the possibility of the death penalty for causing serious injury or death in motor vehicle accidents. Despite its hasty introduction, enforcement of the law has been inconsistent, leading to no significant improvement in road safety. Road accidents have continued to increase, while the government has reduced fines and sentences, attributed to entrenched interests and conflicts of interest between businesses, regulatory authorities, and politicians.

==== Congestion ====
Road traffic congestion is a common issue in major cities, caused by an increasing number of vehicles due to population growth, inadequate road infrastructure, and the presence of slow-moving vehicles like rickshaws, among other factors. Dhaka suffers some of the worst traffic congestion in the world, estimated to cost the economy US$6.5 billion in 2020. On average, people spend 2.4 hours a day stuck in traffic. In 2023, the average speed of a car travelling in the city was found to be less than 4.8 kilometres per hour (3.0 mph), down from 21 kilometres per hour (13 mph) a decade ago. Traffic in Dhaka wasted 3.2 million working hours each day, contributing to additional economic losses through wasted working hours, fuel consumption, and health impacts. Traffic congestion varies during the day, necessitating planning and longer trips; this impacts productivity, cutting across social and economic status. Although walking is a major travel mode of the low-income majority, pedestrian needs are ignored in transport planning. Despite comprising four percent of total vehicles, private cars occupy about 70 percent of road space.

==== Pollution ====
A significant contributor to air pollution in urban areas is motor vehicle emissions. In Bangladesh, pollution severity is exacerbated by a large number of high-polluting vehicles, impure fuel, inefficient land use, and poor traffic management. Leaded gasoline was banned in 1999, and the change to compressed natural gas (CNG) cars in early 2000s saved over 4,000 premature deaths in 2009, but their low cost has increased the number of cars on the roads (although CNG price increases may have tempered the increase) and decreased the amount of natural gas available for other purposes.

Dhaka is the noisiest city in the world, with levels 1.3 to 2 times higher than acceptable limits. The Farmgate intersection in Dhaka experiences the highest noise pollution at 135.6 decibels, while the least polluted area, Uttara-14, registers 100.8 decibels, still far above the permissible level. Rajshahi ranked the fourth noisiest in the world, while noise levels are also above acceptable limits in other cities like Chittagong, Sylhet, Comilla, and Khulna. Despite a ban on the import of loud hydraulic horns in 2017, they remain in widespread illegal use.

== Rail ==
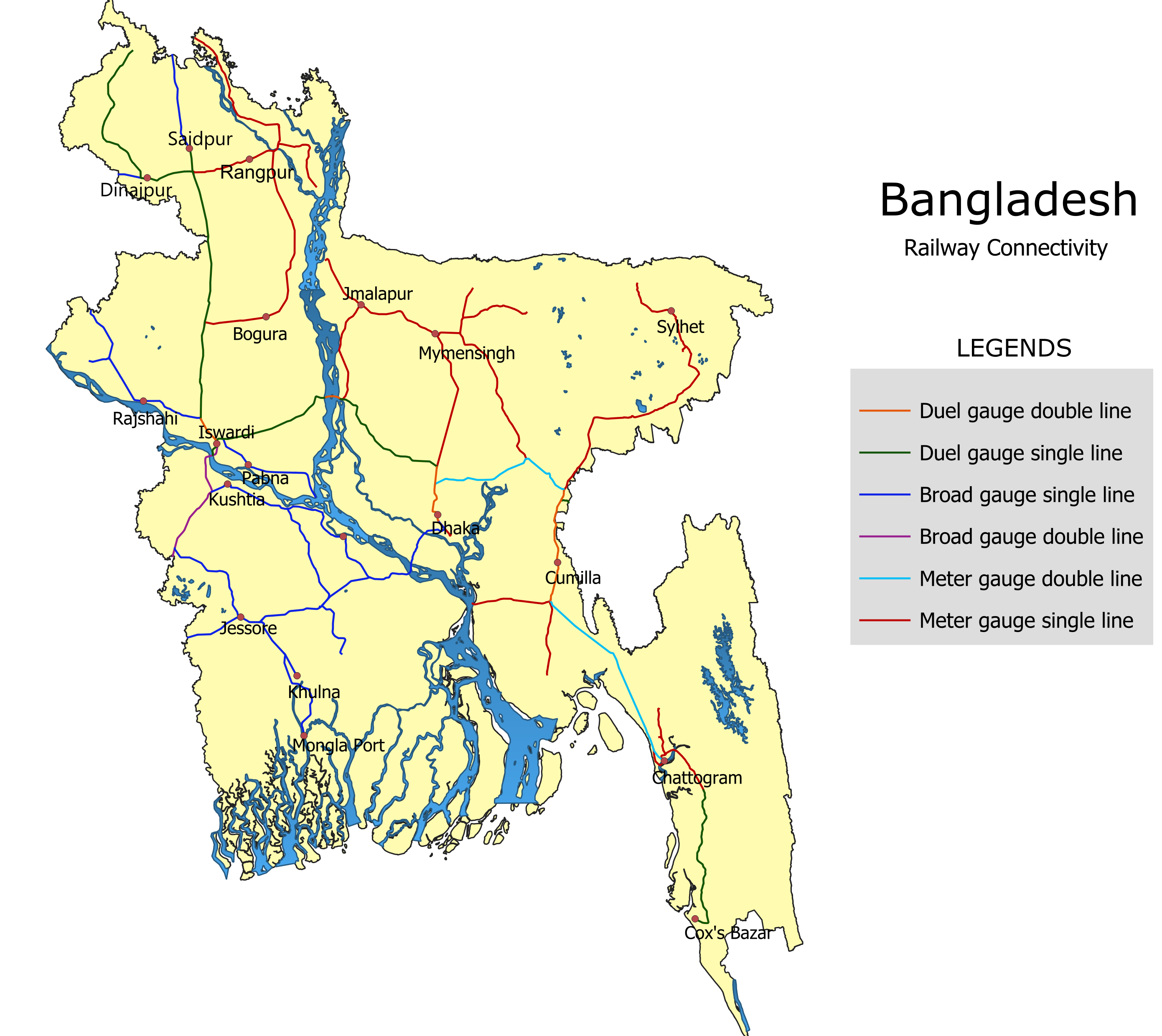
Railway connectivity map of Bangladesh (As of 2025)

The national rail infrastructure is primarily passenger-focused, managed by the state-owned Bangladesh Railway (BR), which was largely inherited from the British Assam Bengal Railway system after the partition of India in 1947. There are about 500 railway stations, with Dhaka Kamalapur being the largest and busiest. In 2023, Bangladesh Railway operated 402 trains daily, while an additional 37 trains were run by four main private companies as of 2024, a practice permitted since the early 2000s. New legislation drafted in 2024 as a successor to a centuries-old law includes provisions allowing private companies to own rolling stock for carrying passengers, goods, and parcels.

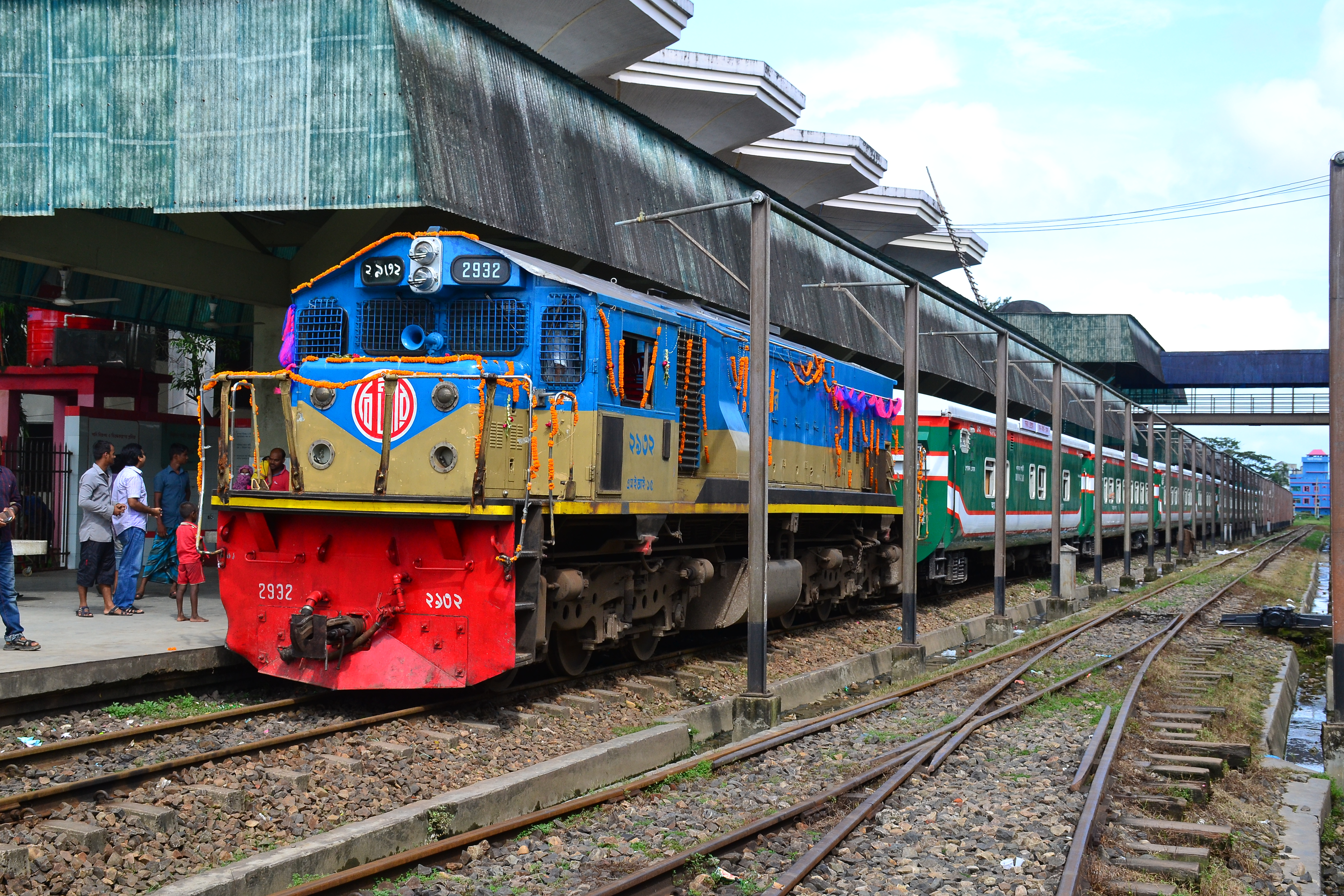
Bangladesh Railway's Parabat Express at Sylhet railway station

Bangladesh Railway has approximately 3,100 kilometres (1,900 mi) of main and branch lines (route km) linking 43 of the 64 districts. Of these, the majority, covering 1,680 km (1,040 mi), are metre-gauge tracks, mainly in the central and eastern regions. About 880 km (550 mi) are 5 ft 6 in (1,676 mm) broad-gauge tracks, concentrated in the western region. The gauge difference is being addressed by adding third rails to major routes, making them dual gauge, with a total of about 533 km (331 mi) converted. Since independence in 1971, few new tracks were laid until the early 2020s, when four additional districts were connected.

In 2020, 64 million passengers travelled by rail in Bangladesh, accumulating nearly 10 billion passenger-kilometres. Despite the railway's emphasis on intercity services, which earned the majority of revenue, almost half of these passengers were on local routes. More than three million tonnes of cargo were transported, totalling over one billion tonne-kilometres, handled by two inland container depots (dry ports): one at Kamalapur, Dhaka, and the other at Pangaon, which is connected to Chittagong port. Regardless of its significance, the railway system faces several challenges—including ageing and scarcity of rolling stock, poor track conditions, and a lack of manpower—leading to substantial losses for Bangladesh Railway.

About 93 million passengers used railways in 2019, while the figure was 73 million in 1970. However, the modal share of rail transport has been decreasing since 1975, dropping from 30 per cent of passenger traffic and 28 per cent of cargo traffic to just 4 per cent for both in 2005.

As of 2024, the country has only one metro line, located in Dhaka, which opened in December 2022. The Dhaka Metro Rail is operated by the Dhaka Mass Transit Company Limited, with additional lines under construction.

=== Important links ===
The Hardinge Bridge, opened in 1915, connected the south-western railways to the north-western regions divided by the Padma River. The Bhairab Railway Bridge (also Bangladesh–UK Friendship Bridge), opened in 1937, facilitates communication between Dhaka and Chittagong over the Meghna River. The combined Jamuna Bridge, opened in 1998, connects the eastern and western rail networks, which were previously separated by the Jamuna River. A dedicated rail bridge beside it—the longest in the country—was opened in March 2025 to meet growing traffic demands.

Railway penetration has been relatively low in the riverine south-western regions of the Ganges Delta, particularly from the capital and the north-east, due to the Padma River acting as a barrier. This challenge was addressed in December 2024 with the inauguration of train services on the Dhaka–Jessore line.

=== International rail ===
The border between India and Bangladesh cuts across railway lines, forcing them into the adjacent country for short distances and complicating border controls such as passport validation. After 43 years, the Maitree Express renewed rail transport between Bangladesh and Kolkata of India in 2008. A second rail service, the Bandhan Express, connecting Kolkata and Khulna, began in 2017. A third service, the Mitali Express, from Siliguri to Dhaka, started in June 2022.

Bangladesh is part of the Trans-Asian Railway network. As part of the project, it planned to extend the railway from Chittagong to Cox's Bazar, with the eventual goal of connecting to Myanmar. However, as of 2022, the plan was to end the track at Cox's Bazar due to deteriorating bilateral relations.

== Air ==
Air travel in Bangladesh peaked at over 17 million passengers in 2023. The Civil Aviation Authority of Bangladesh, which manages and regulates civil aviation activities in the country, reported that the number of outbound travellers from Bangladesh in 2022 was 4.2 million, marking a 124 per cent year-on-year increase. This surge was primarily attributed to migrant workers and pilgrimage. Conversely, 3.5 million travellers arrived in Bangladesh during the same period. Approximately 285,000 tonnes of cargo were transported by air in 2023, with over 30 airlines operating cargo flights to and from the country.

=== Airports ===
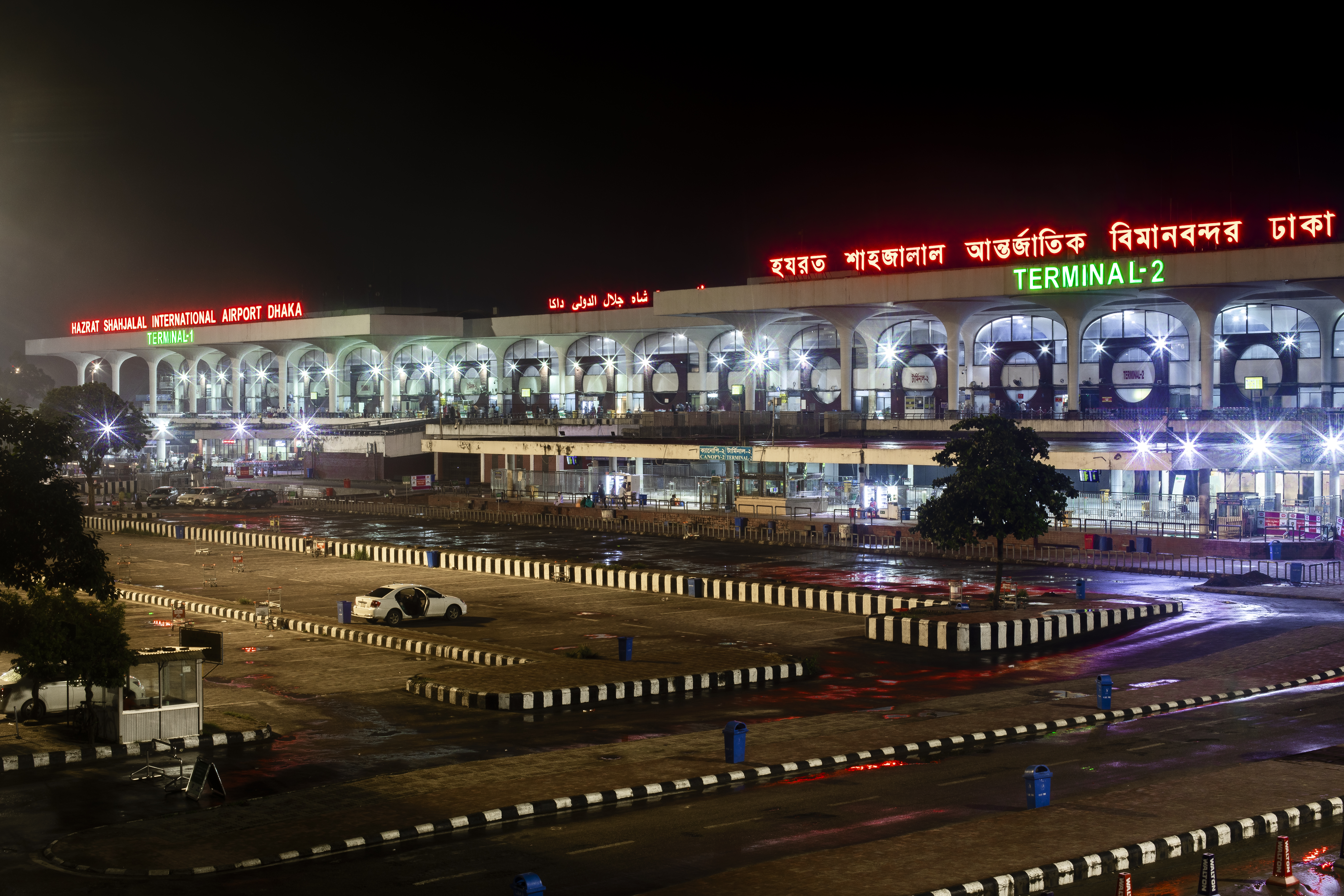
Terminals 1 and 2 of Hazrat Shahjalal International Airport

Of the three international airports in Bangladesh, Hazrat Shahjalal International Airport in Dhaka is the largest and busiest, handling 11.6 million passengers in 2023, which included 52 per cent of domestic and international flights. That year, it served 9.4 million international passengers, with 33 international airlines operating about 160 daily flights. Additionally, it handled 2.2 million domestic passengers with four private airlines and one national airline conducting 170 daily domestic flights. Hazrat Shahjalal processed about 96 per cent of the total air freight, handling a daily average of 400 to 500 tonnes of cargo. Originally built to handle eight million annual passengers, the airport's capacity is expected to more than double to 20 million once the modern third terminal opens fully in October 2024.

Chittagong's Shah Amanat International Airport ranks second, handling 17 percent of passengers. As of 2022, six foreign and two domestic airlines operates flights from Shah Amanat, primarily to destinations in the Middle East. The airport, undergoing significant expansions and renovations, has reported a 20 per cent increase in annual revenue. Osmani International Airport in Sylhet is the third, having seen its first international flight in 2017, and is also undergoing major expansions as of 2023.

In addition to the international airports, there are five operational airports handling domestic-only flights: Barisal, Cox's Bazar, Jessore, Shah Makhdum (Rajshahi), and Saidpur (Nilphamari). Nearly all services at these airports are to or from Dhaka.

The opening of the Padma Bridge in 2022 has particularly impacted air traffic to south-western airports like Jessore and Barisal. Cox's Bazar, a destination that accounts for the bulk of domestic airline revenue, has also seen a decline in air passengers due to a new railway link opened in 2023. Despite this, the government has undertaken projects worth ৳350 billion (US$2.9 billion) to modernise all airports by 2023. Cox's Bazar airport is being upgraded to international status as of 2024, which includes extending its runway to become the longest in the country. Saidpur airport is being turned into a regional hub to facilitate flights from neighbouring countries such as Nepal, Bhutan, and north-east India, while Khan Jahan Ali Airport in Khulna is still under construction, as of 2023.

=== Airlines ===
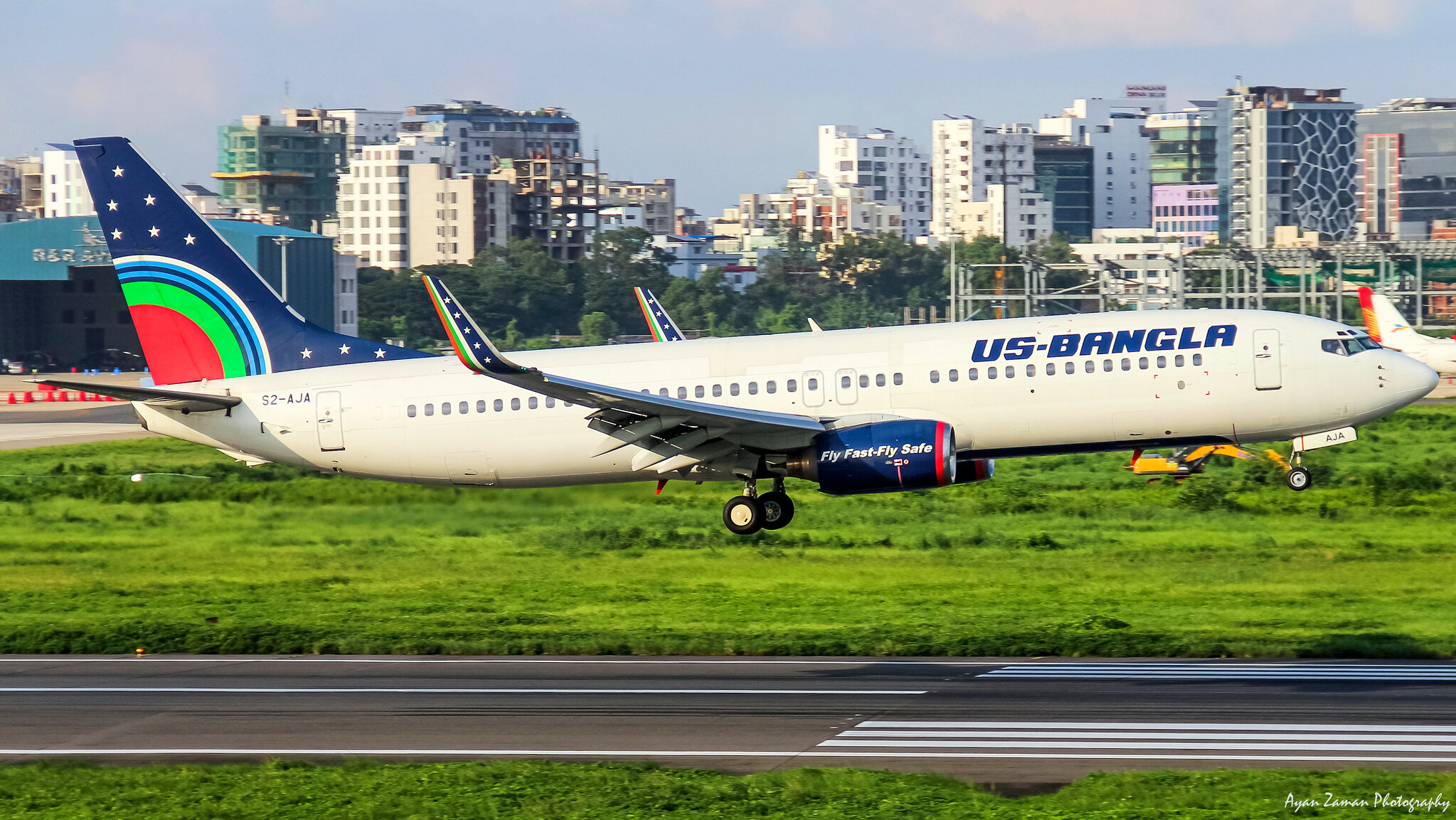
A US-Bangla Boeing 737 taking off from Dhaka airport runway

Biman Bangladesh Airlines, the country's national airline, served eight domestic destinations and 22 international destinations in 16 countries, in 2023. The airline, founded in 1972, has its hub at Hazrat Shahjalal International Airport.

Other Bangladeshi-registered passenger airlines include US-Bangla Airlines, Novoair, Air Astra, and Fly Dhaka. All these carriers have their hub at Hazrat Shahjalal International Airport and operate domestic flights. Except for Air Astra and Fly Dhaka, the aforementioned airlines also offer international flights. As of 2024, Fly Dhaka Airlines marks the 12th private airline to join Bangladesh's aviation sector since the 2000s. However, this period has also witnessed the closure of at least eight private airlines, the most recent being Regent Airways in 2022, primarily due to financial difficulties.

Foreign airlines dominate about 75 per cent of the international route market, with the remaining 25 per cent held by Biman and US-Bangla Airlines. Additionally, more than 80 per cent of the domestic market is controlled by US-Bangla Airlines and Air Astra, both owned by US-Bangla Group. Biman holds less than 20 per cent of the domestic market share, while Novoair covers the rest.

Dedicated cargo airlines of Bangladesh include Bismillah Airlines, Easy Fly Express, SkyAir, Hello Airlines and NXT Air.

== Water ==
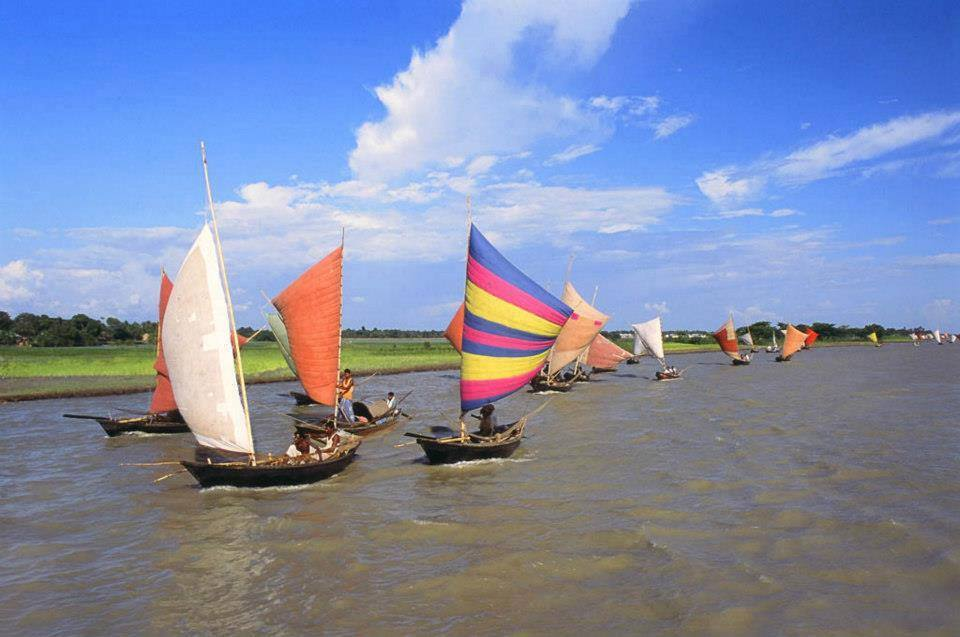
Small wooden boats, used to transport passengers and freight.

=== Inland waterways ===
There are approximately 3,600–6,000 kilometres (2,200–3,700 mi) of navigable waterways depending on the season, including up to 3,060 kilometres (1,900 mi) of major cargo routes. In 2009, it was reported that 20 million tonnes of freight and 90 million passengers utilised inland waterways for transportation annually. However, this number has been in decline, particularly following the opening of the Padma Bridge in 2022, which significantly reduced travel time between south-western Bangladesh and the capital, Dhaka, by road and rail. The modal share of passenger transport through inland waterways in Bangladesh was 8 per cent in 2005, down from 16 per cent in 1975. In 2005, 16 per cent of cargo traffic in Bangladesh used inland waterways, a decrease from 37 per cent in 1975. The Bangladesh Inland Water Transport Authority (BIWTA) is responsible for the development, maintenance, and regulation of inland water transport and navigable waterways in Bangladesh.

=== Ferries ===
The country's extensive river network makes ferries a practical and affordable mode of transport. Passenger ferries, locally referred to as "launches," are widely used to travel to the southern and south-western regions of Bangladesh from the capital. The most popular destinations include Barisal, Bhola, Patuakhali, and Khulna. Additionally, there are water-transport routes connecting Dhaka with Kolkata in India.

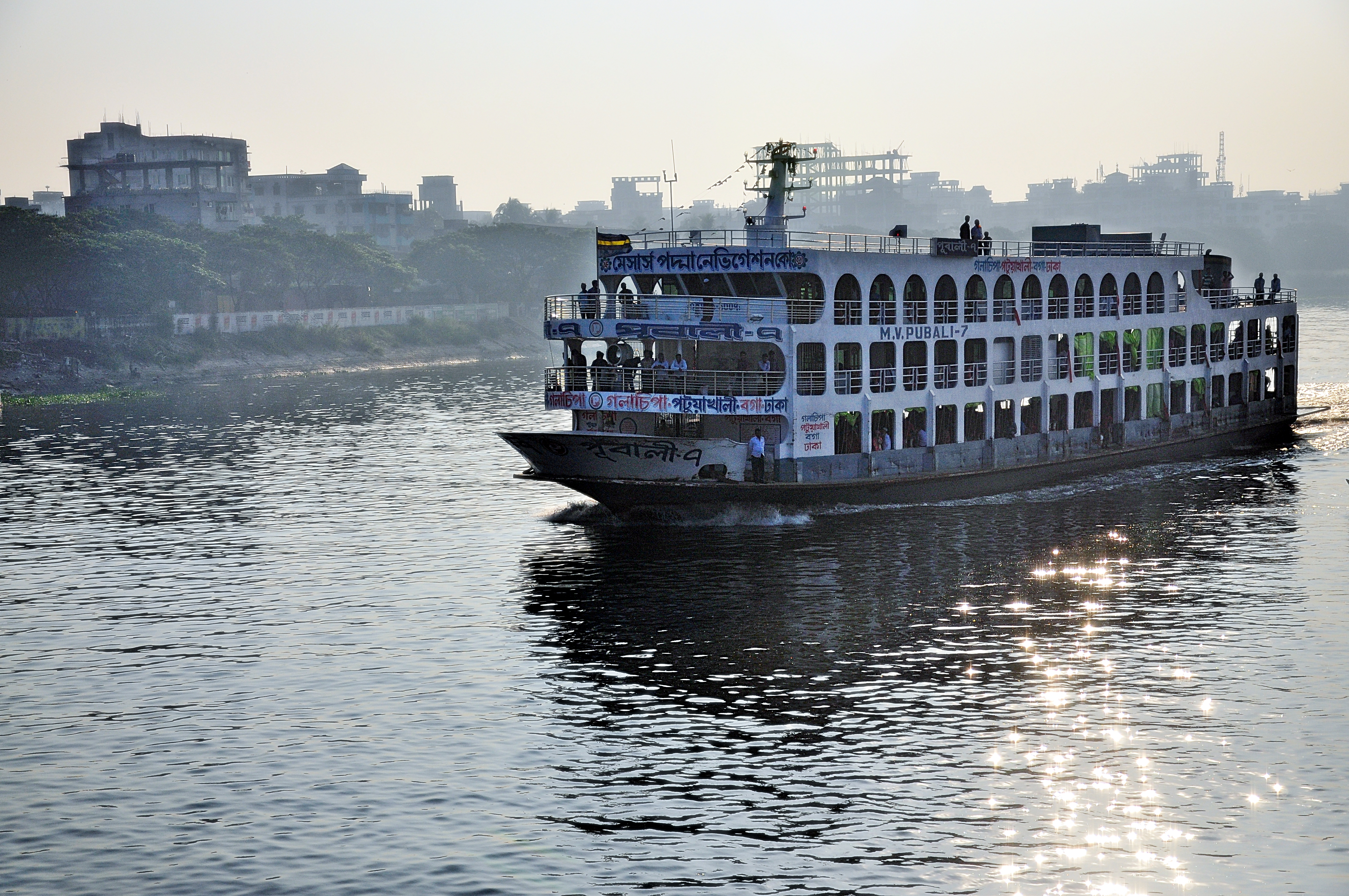
A triple-decker launch (passenger ferry) on a river in Bangladesh

Approximately 200 launches operate across 107 water routes throughout the country as of 2022. To support the launch services, the BIWTA has developed 292 wharfs (ghats) for the docking of these vessels, and oversees 380 launch terminals.

There are 53 roll-on/roll-off ferries running on seven routes across the country: Paturia–Daulatdia, Aricha–Kazirhat, Shimulia–Banglabazar, Bhola–Lakshmipur, Lajarhat–Veduria, Char Kalipur–Kalipur Bazar and Harinaghat Chandpur–Shariatpur.

More than 800,000 small and medium wooden sailboats and rowboats, often retrofitted to be motorised, are an important means of transportation for people and goods across the country, especially during the rainy season. These boats transport over 1.2 million tonnes of freight annually. Among these are the dingi, which is the oldest form of Bengal boat. Larger cargo boats includes vessels such as the balam, bajra and sampan. Under the category of bainkata (flat-bottomed) boats are the ghasi, gachari, dorakha, kathami, mallar, patam and panshi, among others. Ubiquitous throughout Bangladesh, especially in monsoon flood-prone regions, is the kosha, a small, highly manoeuvrable boat that is easy to operate. These various traditional wooden boats play a vital role in providing transportation during the rainy season when other modes become impractical due to flooding.

The ferries are often overloaded and continue to operate in poor weather; many people die each year in ferry and launch accidents. From 2005 to 2015, nearly 1,800 casualties have been reported due to river transport incidents, a number which may be higher due to the prevalence of unregistered vessels. In 2014, the launch Pinak 6 sank in the Padma River with more than 200 passengers aboard near Munshiganj's Louhajang Upazila.

=== Merchant marine ===
As of 2023, the country's merchant navy consisted of 558 ships, including 68 bulk carriers, 10 container ships, 170 cargo ships and 162 oil tankers. The Bangladesh Shipping Corporation, a state-owned entity overseeing the management of ocean-going vessels, has seven ships in its fleet, including tanker ships dedicated to transporting oil for Bangladesh Petroleum Corporation and five ships operating on a charter basis for carrying oil, chemicals, and other products.

=== Ports and harbours ===
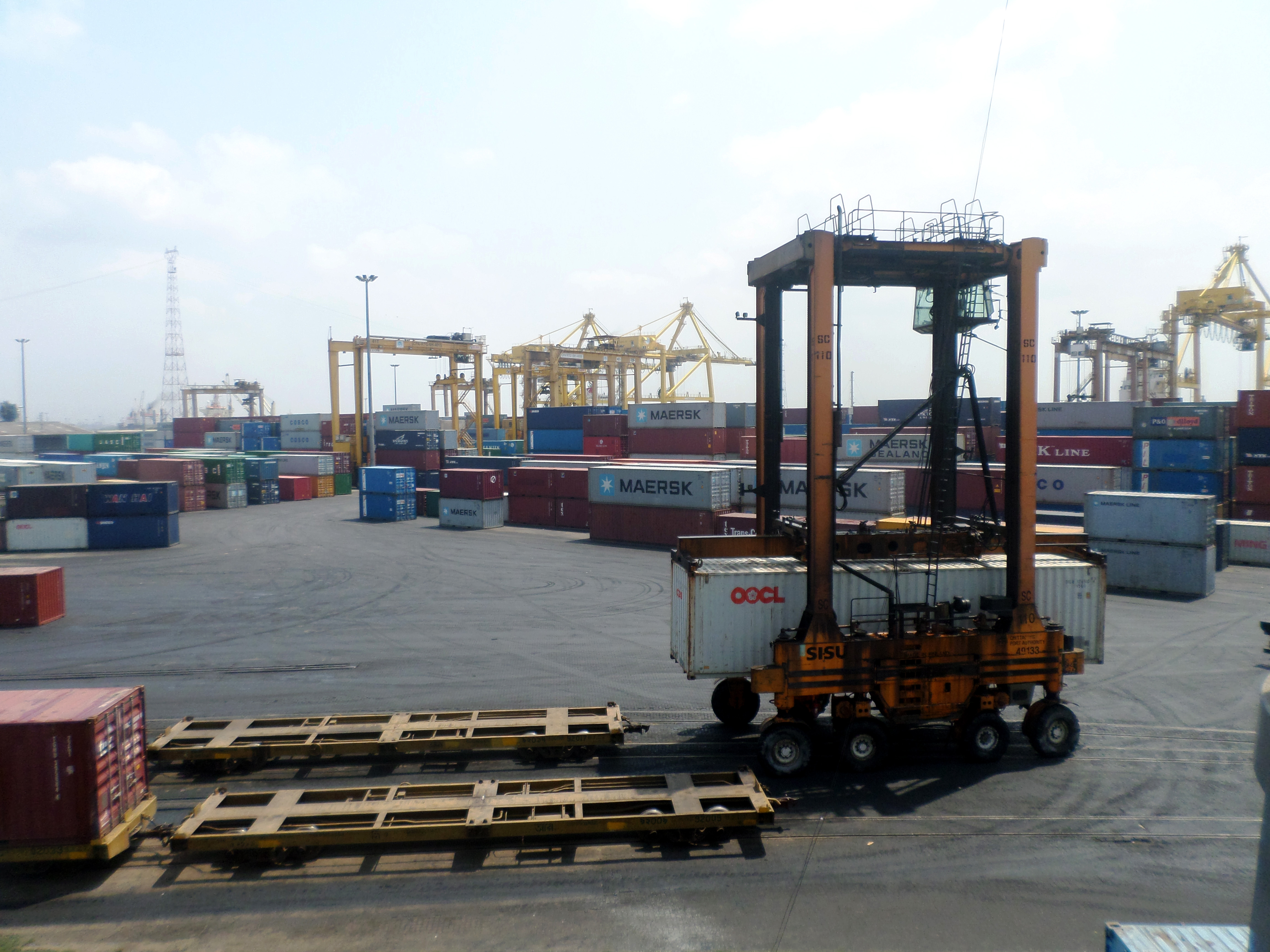
Chittagong port is the busiest port on the Bay of Bengal.

Bangladesh has 22 major river ports used for loading and unloading passengers and goods, as well as for landing motorised marine vessels. These include:

Dhaka, Narayanganj, Barisal, Chandpur, Khulna, Baghabari, Patuakhali, Narsingdi, Aricha, Nagarbari, Daulatdia, Tongi, Maoa, Char Jannat, Ashugonj (Bhairab Bazar), Bhola, Barguna, Noapara, Munshiganj, Chatak, Meghnaghat and Cox's Bazar.

In addition to these major ports, there are 448 small to medium-sized ports throughout the country.

Chittagong is the busiest sea port in Bangladesh, handling 92 per cent of the country's international cargo, followed by Mongla and Payra. The Matarbari Port, under construction, will be the first deep-sea port capable of accommodating large ships by 2026.

== Pipelines ==
In 2013, Bangladesh had about 2,950 kilometres (1,830 mi) of natural gas pipelines. In 2023, the first cross-border pipeline to import petroleum products from India was inaugurated, totalling 131.57 kilometres (81.75 mi) in length. In the same year, the first under-sea pipeline to transport crude oil and diesel from a deep-sea mooring, spanning 110 kilometres (68 mi), was commissioned.

== Neighbouring countries ==
Bangladesh shares border with two nations, India and Myanmar.

- Transport between India and Bangladesh
- Transport between Myanmar and Bangladesh

== See also ==
- Maritime boundary of Bangladesh with India
