= Bismillah (disambiguation) =

Bismillah (Arabic: بسم الله) is one possible English transliteration of an Arabic phrase meaning "in the name of God", which occurs at the beginning of the Qur'an. It may also refer to:

== People ==
- Bismillah Khan (1916–2006), Indian classical musician
- Bismillah Khan Mohammadi (born 1961), Afghan politician
- Bismillah Afghanmal (born 1971), Afghan politician
- Abdul Bismillah (born 1949), Indian novelist writing in Hindi
- Bismillah Jan Shinwari (1984–2025), Afghan cricket umpire

== Film ==
- Bismillah (1925 film) or In the Name of God, a Soviet Azerbaijani propaganda silent film

== Other ==
- Bismillah Airlines, Bangladesh
- Bismullah v. Gates, United States Court of Appeal case, on behalf of Haji Bismullah, Guantanamo detainee 968, an Afghan
- Bismillah album by Peter Cat Recording Co.
- Bismillah ceremony, cultural ceremony celebrated mostly by Muslims from the subcontinent in countries such as Bangladesh, India and Pakistan
