= Chandrarekha Dhadwal =

Indian writer and poet (born 1951)

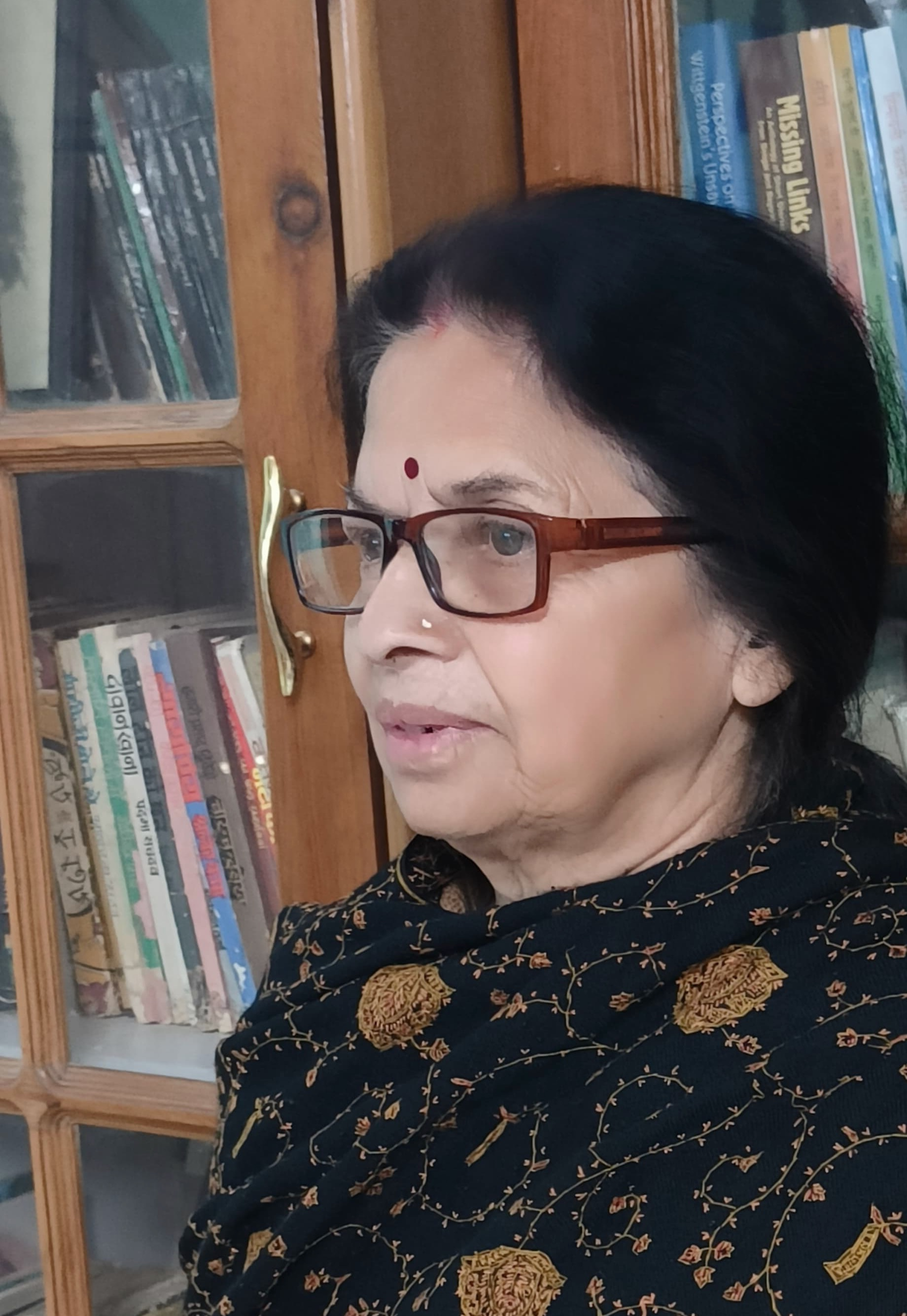
- Born: 15 April 1951 (age 75); Dharamshala
- Occupations: Writer, poet, novelist, retired lecturer
- Notable work: Akkhar-Akkhar Jugnu; Samay Mere Anuroop Hua; Seevanein Udhadti Hui

Chandrarekha Dhadwal (born 15 April 1951, also known as Rekha Dhadwal, and simply as Chandrarekha) is a writer from Himachal Pradesh, India. She is noted for her short stories, poems, novels, and ghazals in Hindi and Pahari.

== Personal life ==
Chandrarekha was born in Dharamshala. She taught Hindi for 34 years, and retired as senior lecturer and the head of Hindi department at the Government College in Dharamshala.

== Works ==
Chandrarekha's ouvre is highly regarded for its nuanced portrayal of the struggles and difficulties faced by women in hill societies, as well as their innate power. Her work is noted for its pithy and witty sentences, as embodied in the following two-liner by her: "On a heated pan/by sprinkling water/the woman cooking roti/learns the art of living".

Shriniwas Joshi notices a "stream of feminist activism" in Zaroorat Bhar Suvidha (2016), Chandrarekha's first anthology of poems in Hindi. He writes that in these poems, Chandrarekha revolts against patriarchal privileges and biases of men, and the lack of alternatives in social roles for women, other than being housewives.

=== Samay Mere Anuroop Hua and Seevanein Udhadti Hui ===
Chandrarekha's novel Samay Mere Anuroop Hua and her anthology of short stories Seevanein Udhadti Hui both came out in 2019, and often received critical appreciation together. Shriniwas Joshi considers both works as feminist in nature. He characterizes her position in these two works as being that a woman should not follow the rut of tradition, but must educate herself, be robust, and individual. He compares Chandrarekha's writing to Mary Ellmann's Thinking About Women and Germaine Greer's The Female Eunuch.

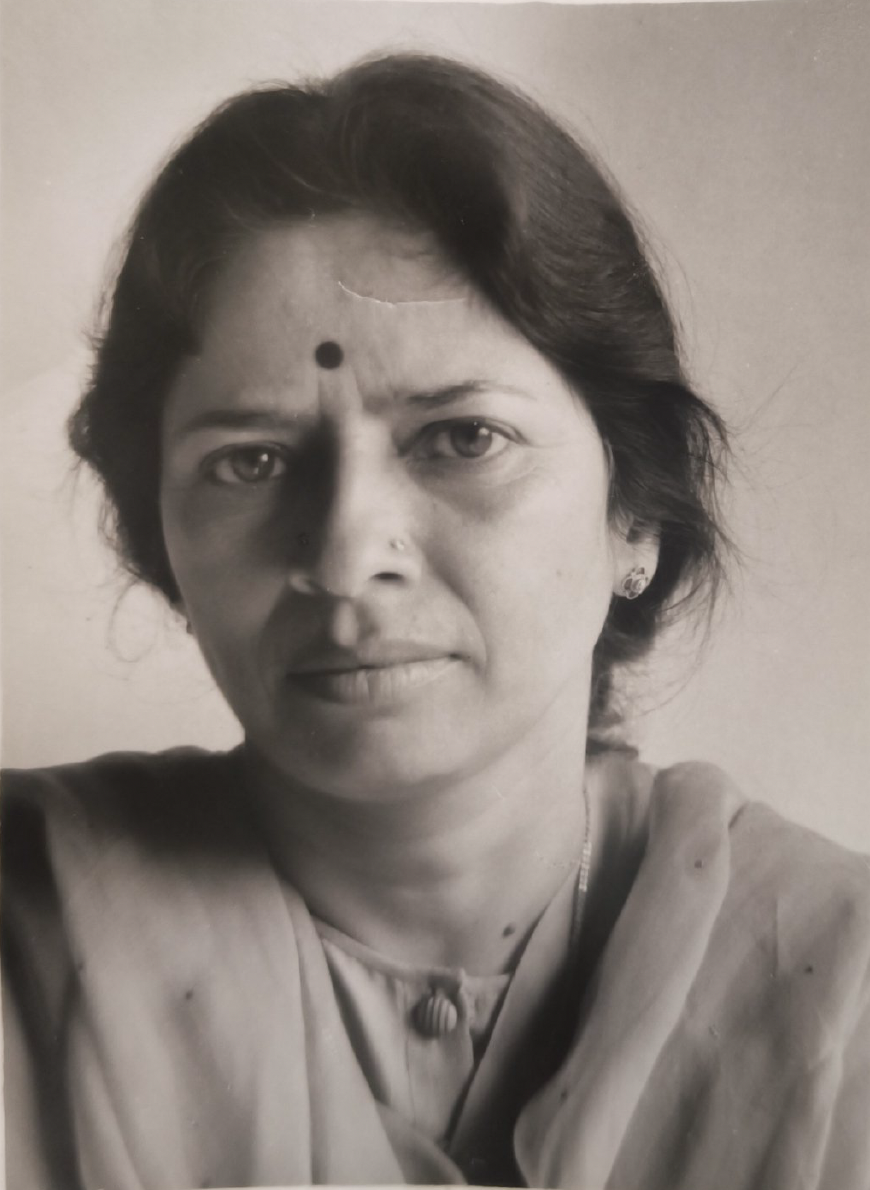
Chandrarekha Dhadwal at a younger age.

Kamlananda Jha of the Aligarh Muslim University positively appraises Samay Mere Anuroop Hua for its complex, multi-layered, and uplifting portrayal of female psychology. Of the short story collection, Jha says that Chandrarekha develops a compelling narrative style, where her prose frequently becomes poetry, blurring the boundaries between the two genres. A lot gets conveyed through bare, unfinished sentences. But this style never becomes overwhelmingly dramatic, and allows Chandrarekha to have a dialogue with the reader through her story.

Suraj Paliwal observes a rare sensitivity in Samay Mere Anuroop Hua portrayal of the alienation and lack of consideration faced by women growing up in Indian families, as well as a distinct personal voice in Chandrarekha's short story collection. Abdul Bismillah deems the novel to be the modern version of Premchand's celebrated novel Nirmala. The novelist Gyan Ranjan considers the novel to be a realistic depiction of contemporary middle-class Indian households. The poet Namita Singh remarks that in Seevanein Udhardti Hui, Chandrarekha locates human values squarely between deep sensitivity and inner contradictions.

Others

Chandrarekha has also collected and analysed endangered Kangri folk songs in three published volumes, in collaboration with the musicologist Janmejai Singh Guleria (see Bibliography).

== Recognition ==
- In 2025, Chandrarekha was awarded the Himachal Gaurav Award by the Government of Himachal Pradesh.
- In 2022, she was awarded the Chandradhar Guleri Bhasha Samman.
- In 2019, she was the Himachal Kala Sahitya Samman.
- In 2016, she was awarded the Pahadi Sahitya Puraskar by the Government of Himachal Pradesh.
- In 2009, Chandrarekha's poems were featured among others in an anthology of representative poetry from Himachal Pradesh, by the Sahitya Akademi, India's national academy of letters.
- Regarded as a well-known author and poet in Himachal Pradesh, Chandrarekha has regularly spoken at literary festivals and book festivals in Dharamshala and Shimla.

== Select bibliography ==
- Dhadwal, Chandrarekha. 2015. Akkhar-Akkhar Jugnu (in Pahadi). Des Sangeet Prakashan, Dharamshala.
- Dhadwal, Chandrarekha and Janmejai Singh Guleria. 2015. Lokbhav Svaranjali. Des Sangeet Prakashan, Dharamshala.
- Dhadwal, Chandrarekha. 2016. Zaroorat Bhar Suvidha (in Hindi). Antika Prakashan, Ghaziabad.
- Dhadwal, Chandrarekha and Janmejai Singh Guleria. 2017. Lokbhav Svaranjali - II. Des Sangeet Prakashan, Dharamshala.
- Dhadwal, Chandrarekha. 2019. Samay Mere Anuroop Hua (in Hindi). Antika Prakashan, Ghaziabad.
- Dhadwal, Chandrarekha. 2019. Seevanein Udhati Huin (in Hindi). Antika Prakashan, Ghaziabad.
- Dhadwal, Chandrarekha. 2022. Aag (in Hindi). Antika Prakashan, Ghaziabad.
- Dhadwal, Chandrarekh and Janmejai Singh Guleria. 2023. Lokbhav Svaranjali - III. Des Sangeet Prakashan, Dharamshala.
