= Shah Amanat International Airport =

International airport in Chattogram, Bangladesh

Shah Amanat International Airport শাহ আমানত আন্তর্জাতিক বিমানবন্দর
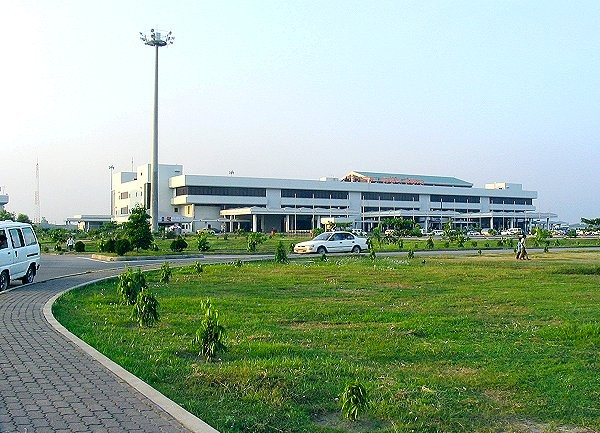
- IATA: CGP; ICAO: VGEG

Summary
- Airport type: Public, military
- Owner: Government of Bangladesh
- Operator: Civil Aviation Authority of Bangladesh
- Serves: Chattogram
- Location: Patenga, Chattogram
- Hub for: Biman Bangladesh Airlines
- Focus city for: Air Astra; Novoair; US-Bangla Airlines
- Built: 1940; 86 years ago
- Time zone: Bangladesh Standard Time (+6)
- Elevation AMSL: 12 ft (3.7 m)
- Coordinates: 22°14′59″N 91°48′48″E
- Website: saia.gov.bd

Map
- Location of airport in Patenga, Bangladesh CGP/VGEG (South Asia) CGP/VGEG (Middle East) CGP/VGEG (Asia)

Runways
Direction	Length		Surface
Direction	ft	m	Surface
05/23	9,646	2,940	Concrete / asphalt

Statistics (2019)
- Passengers: 3,019,064
- Source: Civil Aviation Authority of Bangladesh

Shah Amanat International Airport (IATA: CGP, ICAO: VGEG) (Bengali: শাহ আমানত আন্তর্জাতিক বিমানবন্দর, romanized: Shah Amanôt Antôrjatik Bimanbôndôr) is an international airport serving Bangladesh's southeastern port city of Chattogram. Operated and maintained by the Civil Aviation Authority of Bangladesh, it is the second-largest international airport in Bangladesh after Hazrat Shahjalal International Airport in Dhaka, Bangladesh. A part of the airport belongs to the Bangladesh Air Force as BAF Zahurul Haq Base.

It was formerly known as MA Hannan International Airport, named after Awami League politician M. A. Hannan, but was renamed on 2 April 2005 by the Government of Bangladesh, after an 18th-century Islamic saint, Shah Amanat. It is capable of annually handling 1.5 million passengers and 6,000 tonnes of cargo. It also serves as a base for the Arirang Flying School. Shah Amanat International airport is also a base for the Bangladesh Air Force known as the BAF Zahurul Haq Base which also has facilities for the Bangladesh Naval Aviation and a Bangladesh Army Aviation base.

== History ==
=== World War II ===
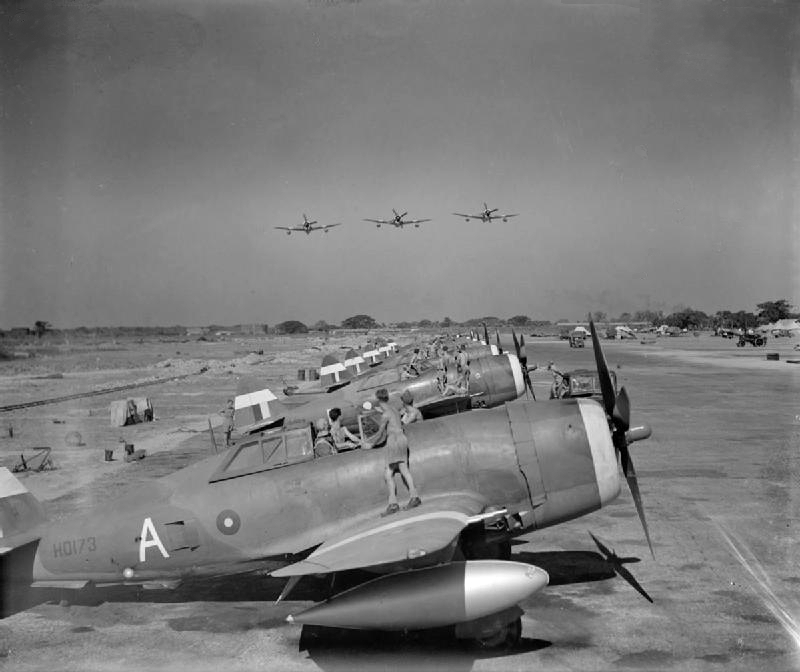
Thunderbolts of 135 Squadron RAF at Chittagong in 1944

The airfield was built in the early 1940s under the British rule. Known as Chittagong Airfield during World War II, it was used as a supply point by the United States Army Air Forces' 4th Combat Cargo Group. From the airport, they flew C-46 Commando aircraft to transport men and supplies between January and June 1945, during the Burma Campaign 1944-1945. At the end of June, control of the airport was returned to local authorities.

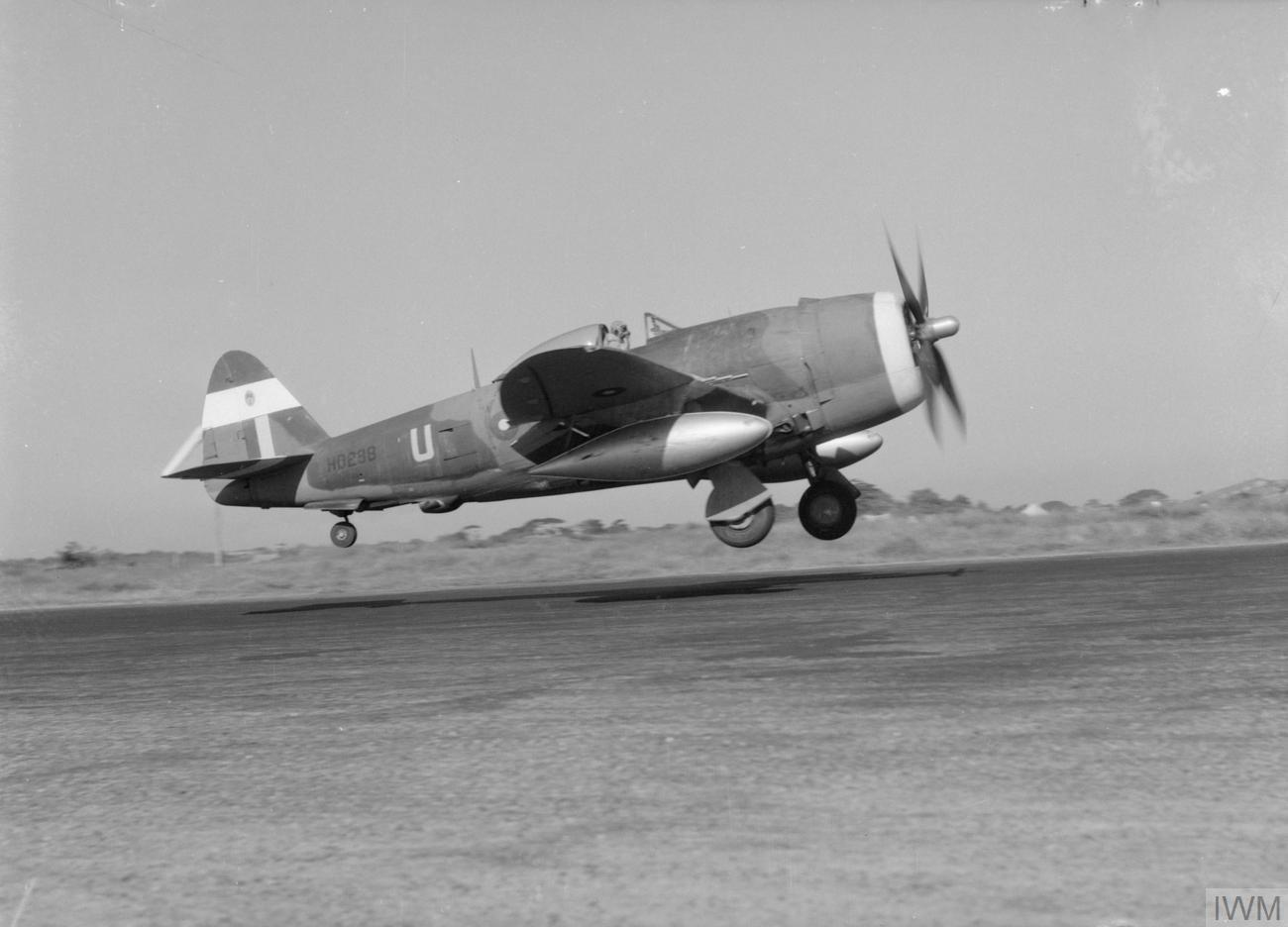
A 30 Squadron Thunderbolt II taking off from Chittagong, 1944

=== Bangladeshi airport ===
It officially became a Bangladeshi airport in 1972 after the Bangladesh Liberation War. At first, it was mainly used for connecting Dhaka and Chittagong. However, In 1998, Hasina I cabinet approved to renovated this airport to making it international airport.

=== Expansion since 1998 ===
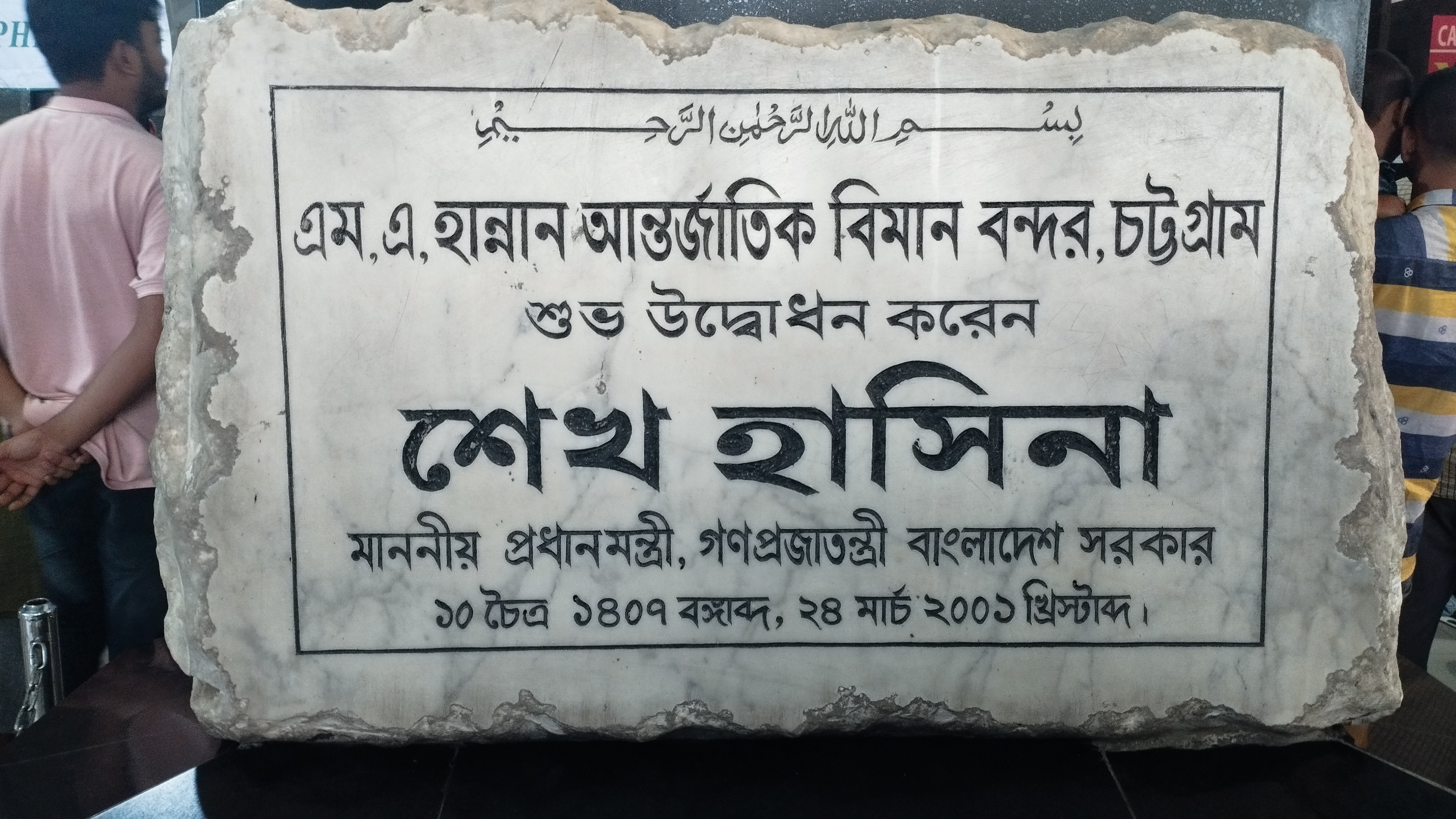

In March 1998, a major renovation and expansion began, which ended in December 2000. CAAB received financial assistance from the Japan International Cooperation Agency for the US$51.57 million upgrade. The project was carried out by Japanese firms Shimizu and Marubeni. The upgrade modernised the terminal with new and better seats, more check-in counters, better security equipment and other facilities. The Air Traffic Control tower received new hi-tech equipment such as 3D radar. The runway, taxiways and the tarmac were expanded and improved. After the upgrade, aircraft such as the Boeing 747-400 or the Airbus A340 can land easily.

In June 2005, CAAB announced that the management of the airport would be awarded to Thai Airways, the national carrier of Thailand, for 10 years. Thai Airways would be responsible of catering, passenger check-in, ground handling, cargo handling, and other technical services. This, however, never materialized.

Biman and US-Bangla Airlines currently operate flights to Dhaka and various points in the Middle East. Foreign airlines include Flydubai, Air Arabia and SalamAir. Novo Air operates flights to Dhaka only. US-Bangla also operates flights to Chennai after originating in Dhaka.

Emirates SkyCargo launched cargo services in 2013, making it the first scheduled cargo airline in the airport.

== Infrastructure and operation ==
=== Terminal ===
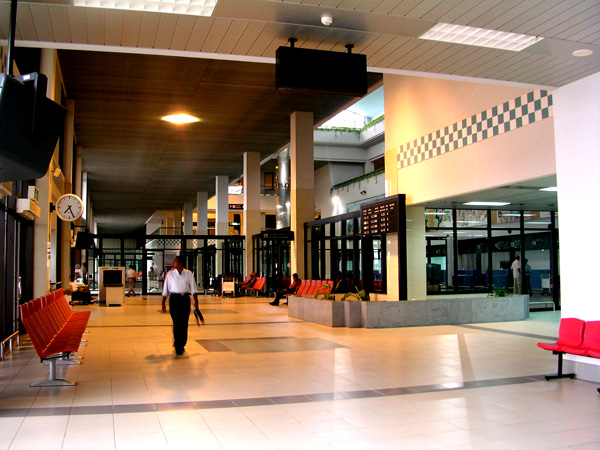
Departure area

The airport's sole, 220,000 square feet (20,000 m^{2}) passenger terminal is divided into two parts: International and Domestic. The International part of the airport has two boarding bridges while the domestic part has one boarding brige. The International part of the terminal is larger than the Domestic one due to higher number of passengers. The building is divided into two floors: The lower floor is used for checking in, boarding or getting off small planes, and receiving luggage. The upper floor is used for boarding or getting off large planes only.

The airport also has a 29,063 square feet (2,700 m^{2}) cargo terminal. A new Lounge has also been created for American express card holders.

=== Control tower ===
The air traffic control tower is 50 meters west of the airport terminal. It has a clear view of the tarmac and taxiways but is far from the runway. Heavy rain or fog can make it difficult for controllers to see planes taking off or landing.

=== Runway ===
The airport has a single runway (05/23), which is 2,940 m × 45 m (9,646 ft × 148 ft). The largest aircraft that can land is an Antonov An-124 Ruslan.

=== Taxiways and tarmac ===
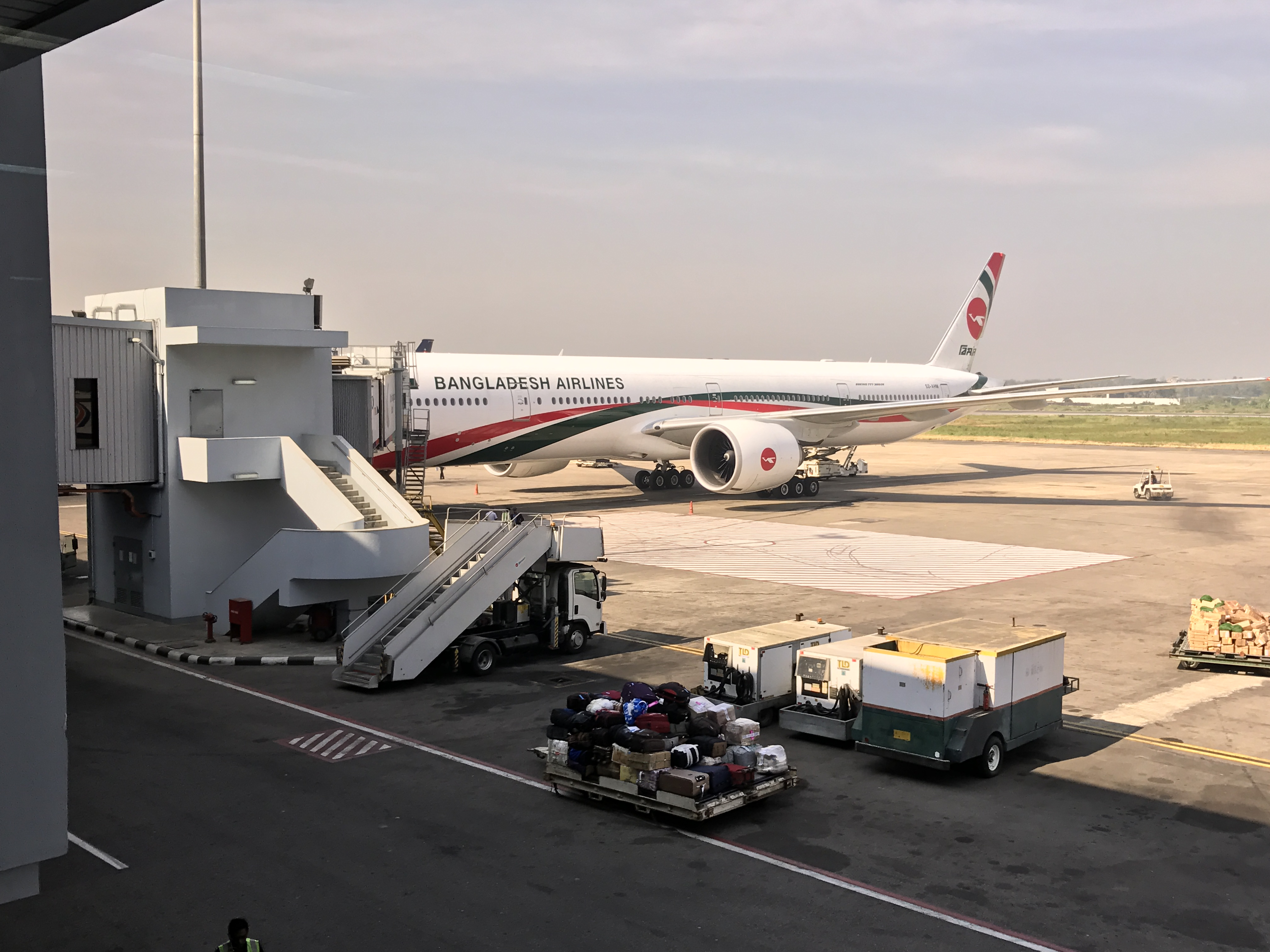
Apron area

The airport has two taxiways, Alpha and Bravo, that directly leads to the tarmac (or aircraft parking zone) from the runway. The tarmac can accommodate a maximum of four aircraft; two wide-body Boeing 747-400s, a wide-body McDonnell Douglas DC-10 and a narrow-body Airbus A320 can be parked there at once.

The airport has two boarding bridges and two passenger steps. The parking points are usually empty as most of the planes that arrive there take off soon after; the planes of local airlines are generally parked at Shahjalal International Airport overnight. A small civil plane hangar belonging to Biman is available but is rarely used.

The Bangladesh Military has a parking zone and two plane hangars east of the runway. The Bangladesh Air Force store a few planes here which have direct access to the runway.

== Location ==
Shah Amanat International Airport is located in the Patenga area of Chattogram, situated on the bank of the Karnaphuli River. It is located approximately 20 km west of the Chattogram Port and 18 km south of the Chattogram railway station.

== Airlines and destinations ==
=== Passenger ===
Airlines	Destinations	Refs.
Air Arabia	Abu Dhabi, Sharjah	
Air Astra	Dhaka	
Biman Bangladesh Airlines	Abu Dhabi, Dhaka, Doha, Dubai–International, Jeddah, Medina, Muscat, Sharjah,	
flydubai	Dubai–International	
Novoair	Dhaka	
Salam Air	Muscat	
US-Bangla Airlines	Abu Dhabi, Dhaka, Doha, Kolkata, Muscat	

=== Cargo ===
Airlines	Destinations	Refs.
Bismillah Airlines	Cox's Bazar, Dhaka	
Easy Fly Express	Cox's Bazar, Dhaka	
Etihad Cargo	Abu Dhabi, Hanoi	
Hello Airlines	Dhaka	
SkyAir	Cox's Bazar, Dhaka	

== Ground transportation ==
Shah Amanat International Airport can be easily accessed by car or taxi thorough the city's Agrabad and GEC area. It has three parking zones: one civil and two VIP. The civil one is in front of the terminal; it has a capacity of 400 cars. The zone is made of concrete and asphalt, surrounded by a grass patch.

== Incidents and accidents ==
- April 23, 1942:A Douglas DB-7 Boston of USAAF This aircraft crashed immediately during takeoff from Chittagong for an operational mission to Yangon. All four crew members, including pilot P/O William B. Rrice, were killed in the accident.
- September 27, 1945:A Douglas C-47A Dakota of USAAF Shortly after takeoff from Patenga, an engine caught fire. The captain attempted an emergency belly landing in a nearby field; the aircraft slid into a ditch and was destroyed by fire, though all four crew members survived with injuries.
- October 19, 1945: A Douglas C-47B Dakota of USAAF In a late-war accident, this transport plane skidded on the runway during takeoff. Though it managed to lift off momentarily, it stalled and crashed in flames, resulting in at least one fatality.
- March 4, 1942: A Bristol 142 Blenheim of RAF While not at the airfield itself, this aircraft crashed into the sea off nearby Cox's Bazar for unknown reasons. Both pilots were rescued after the ditching.
- September 9, 1942: Another Bristol Blenheim After being severely damaged by Japanese fighters over Akyab, the crew managed to fly back to Chittagong. However, the plane crashed upon landing and was destroyed beyond repair.
- November 23, 1944: A Curtiss C-46B commando crashed shortly after takeoff due to heavy fog. Killing all 12 crew members and 14 civilians on the ground.
- 1 July 2005: Biman flight BG 048 en route from Dubai skidded off runway 23 onto the grass while landing during heavy rain. The right-hand undercarriage of the McDonnell Douglas DC-10-30 caught fire. Ten passengers were injured while exiting. Investigations found that the wheel-box of the aircraft went out of order. The aircraft was later written-off.
- June 29, 2015: A Chengdu F-7MB fighter disappeared into the Bay of Bengal off Chattogram during a training mission.The results are still unknown.
- July 11, 2017: A Yak-130 crashed during training in Lohagara, Chattogram; both pilots survived.
- 3 August 2017: A Bangladesh Navy Dornier 228 aircraft on a routine training exercise veered off runway 23 after landing. No crew members were injured during the incident. The airport was closed for about 3 hours; a Cessna 152 training aircraft landed safely on the opposite runway a few minutes after the incident.
- 26 September 2018: A US-Bangla Airlines Boeing 737NG aircraft bound for Cox's Bazar from Dhaka was forced to make an emergency landing when the pilots had difficulty in trying to lower the nose-gear. The aircraft carrying 171 passengers and crew, made an emergency landing at Chittagong, Shah Amanat International Airport at 1:45 pm local time. No injuries and fatalities occurred as the flight crew, was able to evacuate the entire plane as emergency services rushed to the scene.
- On 25 February 2019, a Biman Bangladesh Airlines Flight 147 was subject to attempted hijacking. The Boeing 737-800, bound for Dubai via Chittagong, was carrying 143 passengers and seven crew members. The plane made an emergency landing at 5:41pm. The alleged hijacker was killed in a commando operation at Shah Amanat International Airport after all passengers were evacuated safely. It has emerged that the hijacker was mentally deranged and wanted to speak to his estranged ex-wife during the saga.
- May 9, 2024: A Yakovlev Yak-130 training jet crashed in Patenga, Chattogram due to pilot error. The co-pilot ejected and survived but the squadron leader did not as his parachute was in fire and the ejection seat was not working, resulting in the death of Squadron Leader Asim Jawad.
