= List of airlines of Bangladesh =

Bangladesh has seen a total of 12 Bangladeshi private airlines in the past 25 years. US-Bangla is the second largest airline in Bangladesh by fleet size while Biman Bangladesh is the national flag carrier and the first largest airline by fleet size.

This is a list of airlines which have an Air Operator Certificate issued by the Civil Aviation Authority of Bangladesh.

== Scheduled airlines ==
Airline	Image	IATA	ICAO	Callsign	Hub airport(s)
Air Astra		2A	AWA	CAPELLA	Shahjalal International Airport
Biman Bangladesh Airlines		BG	BBC	BANGLADESH	Shahjalal International Airport; Shah Amanat International Airport; Osmani International Airport
Novoair		VQ	NVQ	NOVOAIR	Shahjalal International Airport
US-Bangla Airlines		BS	UBG	BANGLASTAR	Shah Amanat International Airport; Cox's Bazar Airport; Shahjalal International Airport

== Charter airlines ==
Airline	Image	IATA	ICAO	Callsign	Hub airport(s)
R&R Aviation				RNR Aviation	Shahjalal International Airport
Arirang Aviation Limited			MGP	MAGPIE	Shahjalal International Airport
South Asian Airlines			BDS	SOUTH ASIAN	Shahjalal International Airport
BRB Air Limited				BRB AIR	Shahjalal International Airport
Beximco Aviation Limited				BEXAL	Shahjalal International Airport
Square Air Limited				square air	Shahjalal International Airport
Bashundhara Airways				BASHUNDHARA AIR	Shahjalal International Airport
Impress Aviation Limited				Impress Aviation	Shahjalal International Airport
Meghna Aviation Limited				Meghna Aviation	Shahjalal International Airport
Bangla International Airlines Limited				BIAL	Shahjalal International Airport
BCL Aviation Limited				BCL Aviation	Shahjalal International Airport

== Cargo airlines ==
Airline	Image	IATA	ICAO	Callsign	Hub airport(s)
Bismillah Airlines		BH	BML	Bismillah Air	Shahjalal International Airport
Easy Fly Express		8E	EFX	EASY EXPRESS	Shahjalal International Airport
SkyAir		S8	AHW	Sky Capital	Shahjalal International Airport
Hello Airlines		H3			Shahjalal International Airport

== See also ==
- List of airlines
- List of defunct airlines of Bangladesh
- List of defunct airlines of Asia
- List of airports in Bangladesh
- Civil Aviation Authority of Bangladesh
