= South Asian Airlines =

Bangladeshi airline

IATA	ICAO	Call sign
-	BDS	SOUTH ASIAN
- Founded: 1998 (28 years ago)
- Commenced operations: 1999 (27 years ago)
- Operating bases: Shahjalal International Airport
- Fleet size: 4
- Headquarters: Dhaka
- Key people: Abdul Mannan (chairman)
- Website: southasian-airlines.com

South Asian Airlines is a charter airline from Bangladesh. It was founded in 1998 and commenced operations in 1999. The airline has its main hub at the Shahjalal International Airport and its fleet comprises four Robinson R66 aircraft.

== Fleet ==
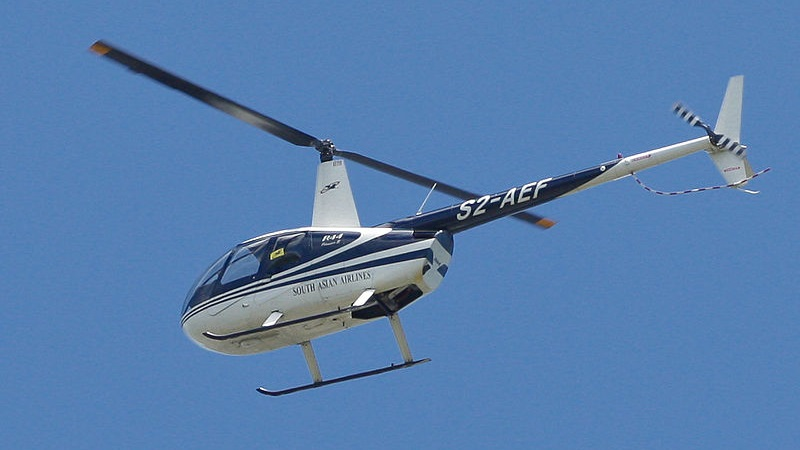
R44 II of South Asian Airlines

South Asian Airlines fleet
Aircraft	In fleet	Orders	Historic	Capacity	Notes
Robinson R66	4	—	—	4	
Total	4	—	—		

== See also ==
- List of airlines of Bangladesh
