= Novoair =

Bangladeshi airline

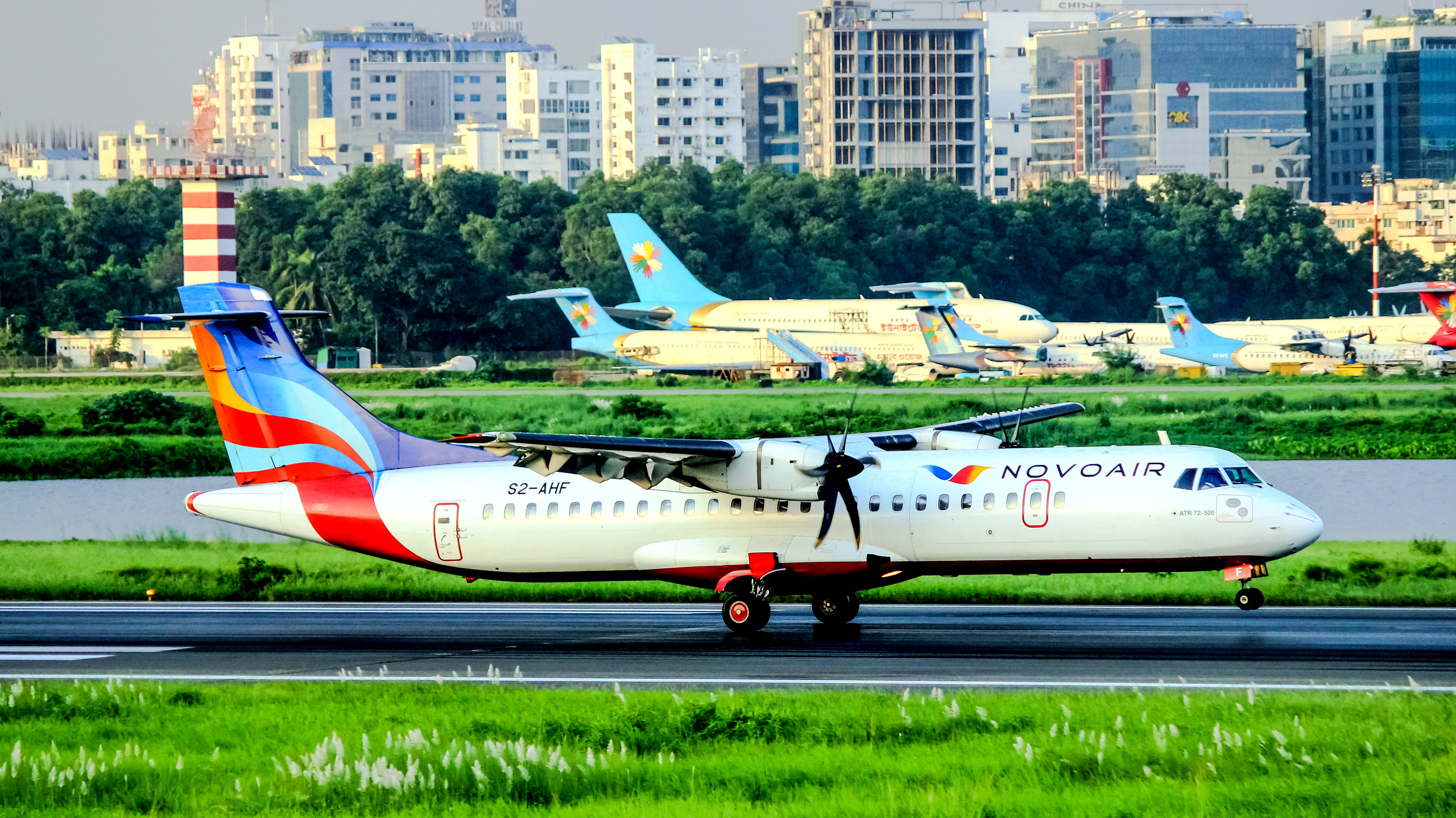
IATA	ICAO	Call sign
VQ	NVQ	NOVOAIR
- Founded: 2007; 19 years ago
- Commenced operations: 9 January 2013; 13 years ago
- Hubs: Shahjalal International Airport
- Frequent-flyer program: Smiles
- Fleet size: 5
- Destinations: 5
- Headquarters: Dhaka, Bangladesh
- Key people: Fayzur Rahman Badal (chairman); Mofizur Rahman (managing director); Arshad Jamal (director & CFO)
- Website: flynovoair.com

Novoair (Bengali: নভোএয়ার) is a Bangladeshi airline based in Dhaka operating mostly domestic flights. It operates 25 flights each day from Dhaka to eight destinations.

== History ==
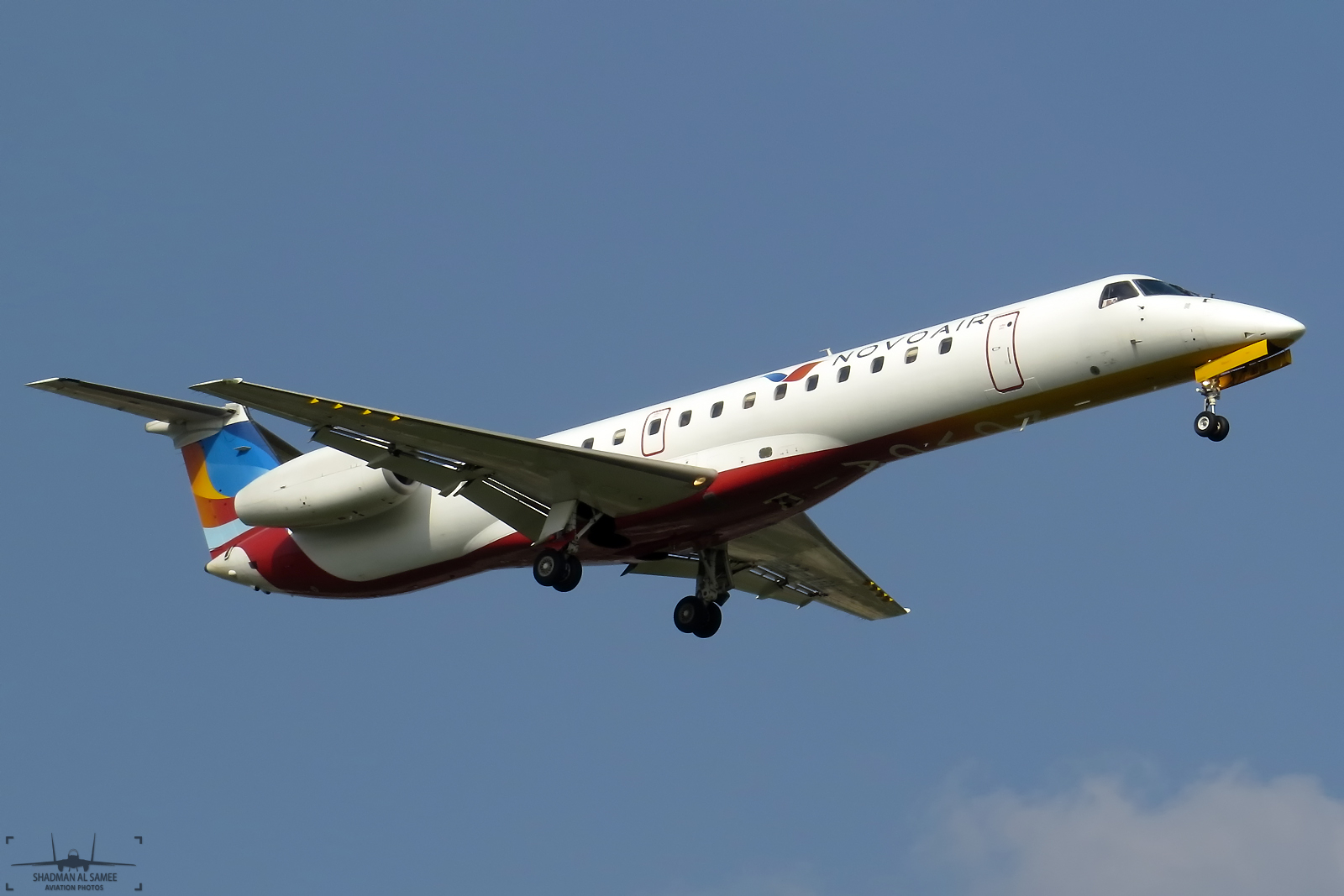
A former Novoair Embraer 145 in 2017.

Novoair was established in October 2007 as an aviation service provider as the business diversification of parent company Tusuka Group with directors Arshad Jamal, Faiz Khan, Mofizur Rahman, and Fayzur Rahman Badal. The process of establishing a scheduled airline began in late 2011. Novoair launched its commercial operations on 9 January 2013, with two Embraer 145 jet aircraft, becoming the first Bangladeshi airline to operate this type.

In July 2013, Novoair launched Smiles, the frequent-flyer program of the airline. Smiles is the first frequent-flyer program for domestic flights in Bangladesh's aviation history. Tiered benefits include special offers, travel packages, waiting list priority, priority services (sales counter, check-in and boarding) and excess baggage allowance.

Novoair received the Monitor's best domestic airlines award in 2014. Novoair launched international flights on 1 December 2015. In the same year, the airline added another Embraer 145.

On 15 December 2019, the airline added its seventh aircraft. As of its seventh anniversary on 9 January 2020, Novoair had operated 61,599 flights to domestic destinations and its only international destination, Kolkata, carrying more than 3.33 million passengers.

In January 2024, it sold two ATR 72-500 to Nepali Yeti Airlines amid the low turnout of domestic passengers. In June 2024, Novoair revealed its plan to convert its entire fleet to be used only for international flight operations with all its remaining ATR-72 aircraft already up for sale.

On 2 May 2025, Novoair temporarily suspended all of its flights claiming it was in order to sell its aircraft. Flights resumed on 21 May.

In 2026, Novoair announced that it was planning on starting international flights to 6 new routes by mid-2026.

== Destinations ==
The airline currently operates to only domestic destinations of the country. It used to operate flights to Kolkata until its suspension in 2024. As of 2025, Novoair serves the following destinations:

Country	City	Airport	Notes
Bangladesh	Barishal	Barishal Airport	Suspended
Bangladesh	Chattogram	Shah Amanat International Airport	
Bangladesh	Cox's Bazar	Cox's Bazar Airport	
Bangladesh	Dhaka	Shahjalal International Airport	Hub
Bangladesh	Jashore	Jessore Airport	Suspended
Bangladesh	Rajshahi	Shah Makhdum Airport	Suspended
Bangladesh	Saidpur	Saidpur Airport	
Bangladesh	Sylhet	Osmani International Airport	
India	Kolkata	Netaji Subhas Chandra Bose International Airport	Suspended

== Fleet ==
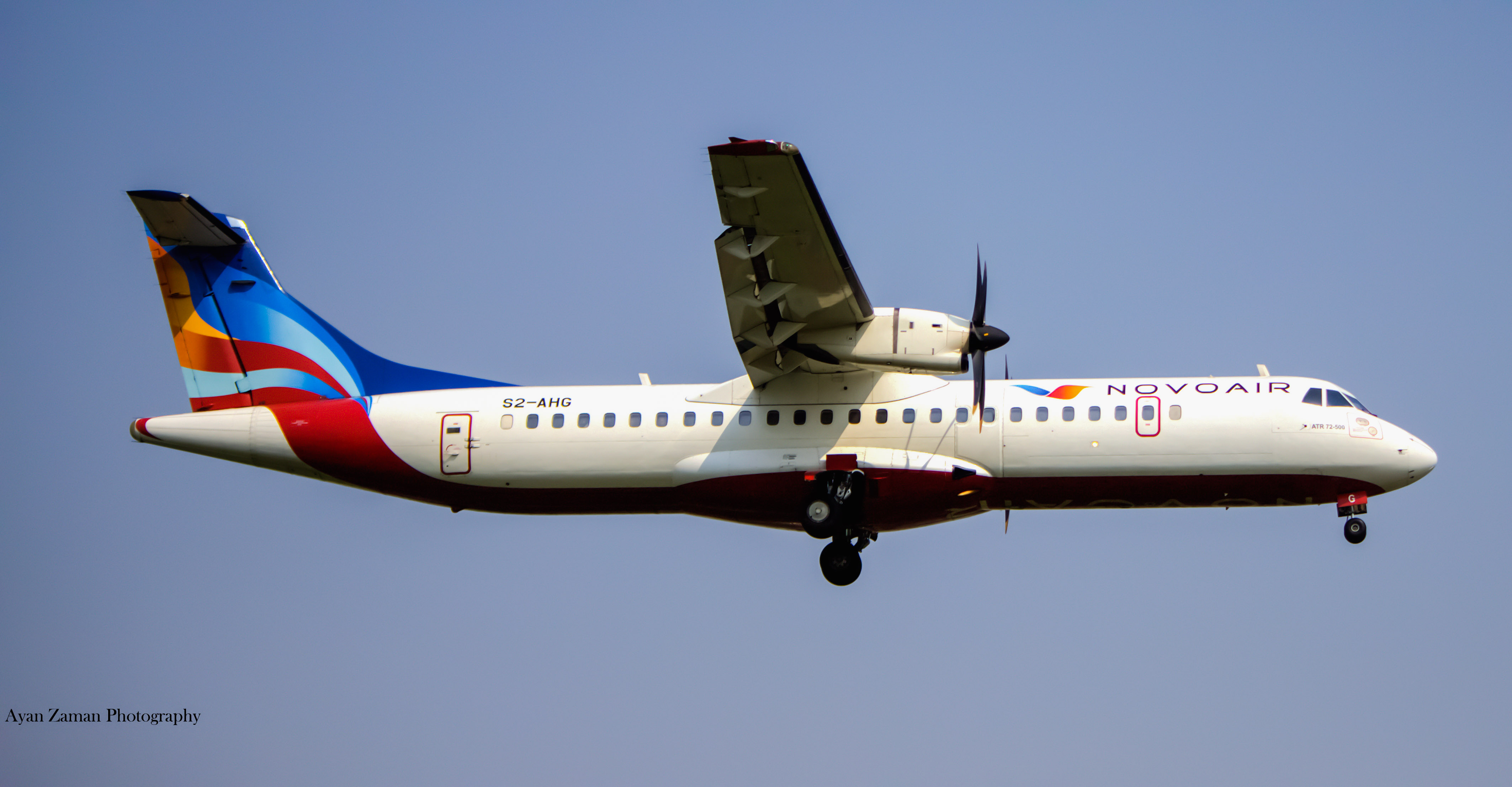
Novoair ATR 72-500

As of August 2025, Novoair operates the following aircraft:

Novoair fleet
Aircraft	In service	Orders	Passengers	Notes
ATR 72-500	5	—	70	
Total	5	—		

== Incidents and accidents ==
- On 17 November 2019, a Novoair flight's tire burst while landing, with 33 passengers, at Shah Makhdum Airport in Rajshahi. No injuries were reported.
- On 17 November 2021, a Novoair aircraft (VQ-967) carrying 70 passengers suffered a burst tire while landing at Saidpur Airport. The plane managed to stop near the end of the runway. There were casualties reported.

== See also ==
- List of airlines of Bangladesh
- Transport in Bangladesh
