= Bismullah v. Gates =

Bismullah v. Gates is a writ of habeas corpus appeal in the United States Justice System, on behalf of Bismullah (Guantanamo detainee 968)—an Afghan detainee held by the United States in the Guantanamo Bay detention camps, in Cuba. It was one of over 200 habeas corpus petitions filed on behalf of detainees held in the Guantanamo Bay detention camp in Cuba.

== Rasul v. Bush ==
Initially, the Bush Presidency asserted that none of the captives apprehended during the "global war on terror" were protected by the Geneva Conventions. The Bush Presidency asserted that the Guantanamo Bay Naval Base was not United States territory, and that it was not subject to United States law. Consequently, they challenged that the captives were entitled to submit writs of habeas corpus.

The Supreme Court of the United States ruled, in Rasul v. Bush, that the Guantanamo base was covered by US law.

== Hearing before the DC Court of appeals ==
The United States Court of Appeals for the District of Columbia Circuit reached a decision in Bismullah v. Gates on July 20, 2007.

The three judge panel ruled that Guantanamo captive's attorneys should be allowed to review all the classified evidence in their client's dossier.

On September 1, 2007, the United States Department of Justice requested a rehearing en banc of Bismullah v. Gates. The Department of Justice's request stated:

"The record as defined by Bismullah is not simply a collection of papers sitting in a box at the Defense Department. It is a massive undertaking just to produce the record in this one case." Producing it by a court-ordered Sept. 13 deadline in Paracha "is not possible without potentially compromising the reliability of the production and without also fundamentally compromising the intelligence agencies' ability to redact sensitive national security material, as permitted by this Court's Bismullah decision."

Senior members of the US intelligence establishment went on record to support the Department of Justice's request for a re-hearing. The five senior official filed documents supporting the Department of Justice request on September 7, 2007—six days before the deadline expired. Two of the five documents were classified secret.

CIA Director Michael V. Hayden wrote:

The breadth of discovery apparently required by the Court's decision will include information about virtually every weapon in the CIA's arsenal to combat the terrorist threat to the United States.
