= Suraj Paliwal =

Indian professor and author (born 1951)

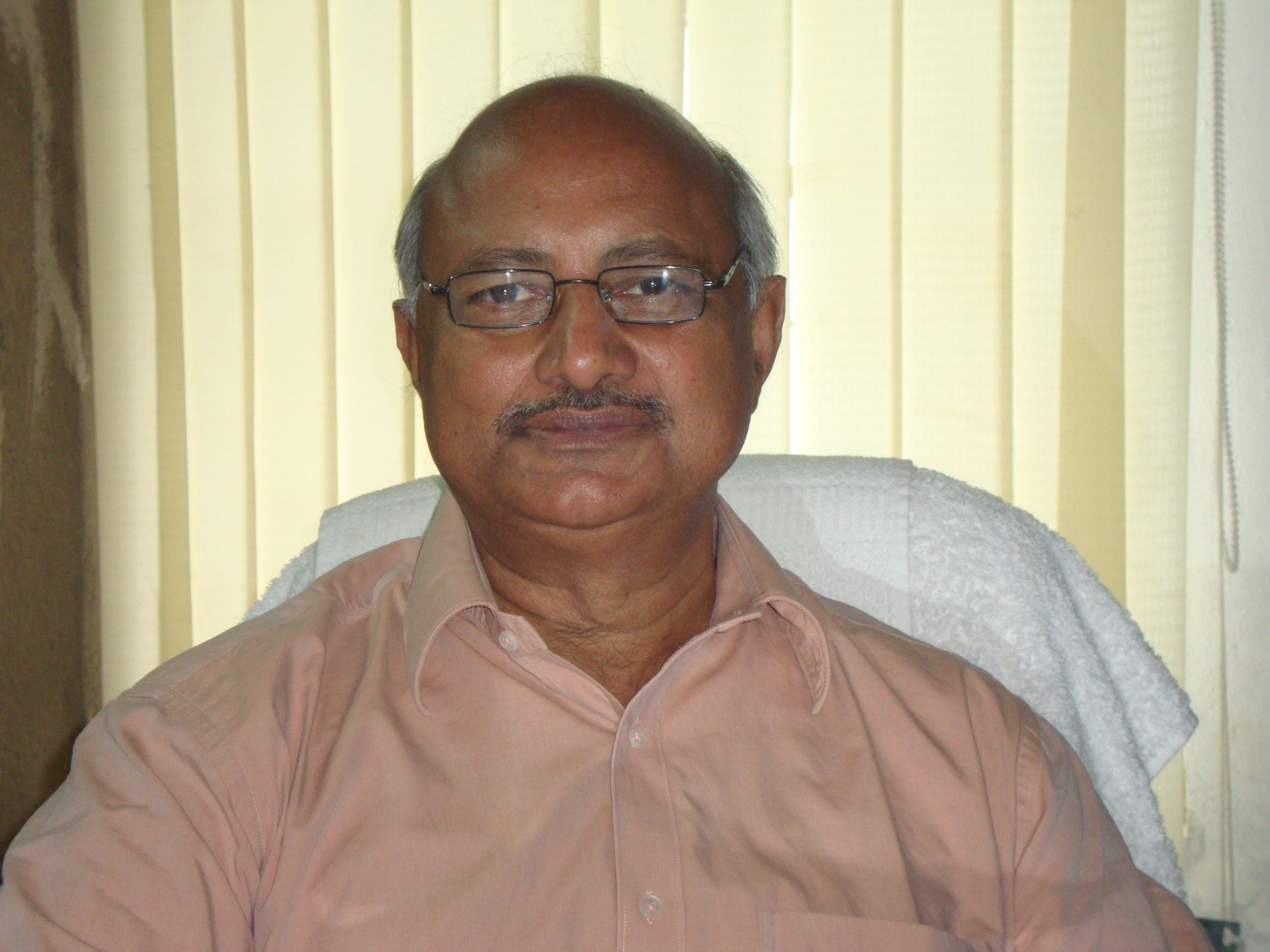
- Born: 8 November 1951 (age 74); Mathura, Uttar Pradesh, India
- Citizenship: Indian
- Occupations: Writer, Educator.
- Writing career
- Notable awards: Premchand Award, Panjub Art and Literary Academy Award, Dr. Ram Vilash Sharma Award for Criticism, Acharya Niranjan Nath Literary Award

Suraj Paliwal (born 8 November 1951) is an Indian professor and author who writes in Hindi.

== Award ==
- Premchand Award, Panjub Academy Award for Art and Literature
- Dr. Ram Vilash Sharma Award for Criticism
- Acharya Niranjan Nath Literary Award

== Works in Hindi ==
=== Criticism ===
- Phanishwarnath Renu Ka Katha Sahitya

== Works in Hindi ==
- "Tika Pradhan"
- "Jangal"
