= SkyAir =

Bangladeshi cargo airline

Sky Capital Airlines Ltd
IATA	ICAO	Call sign
S8	AHW	Sky Capital
- Founded: 2009; 17 years ago
- Commenced operations: 26 January 2010; 16 years ago
- Hubs: Shahjalal International Airport; Cox's Bazar Airport
- Fleet size: 4
- Destinations: 6
- Parent company: Blueplanet Group
- Headquarters: Dhaka, Bangladesh
- Key people: Md Arifur Rahman (Chairman); Khalil bin Wahid (MD); J M Mostafizur Rahman (CEO)
- Website: skycapitalcargo.com

SkyAir, legally Sky Capital Airlines, is a cargo airline headquartered in Dhaka, Bangladesh and based at Shahjalal International Airport.

== History ==
The airline received an air operator's certificate (AOC) issued by Civil Aviation Authority, Bangladesh in November 2009. Commercial operations commenced on 26 January 2010.

== Fleet ==
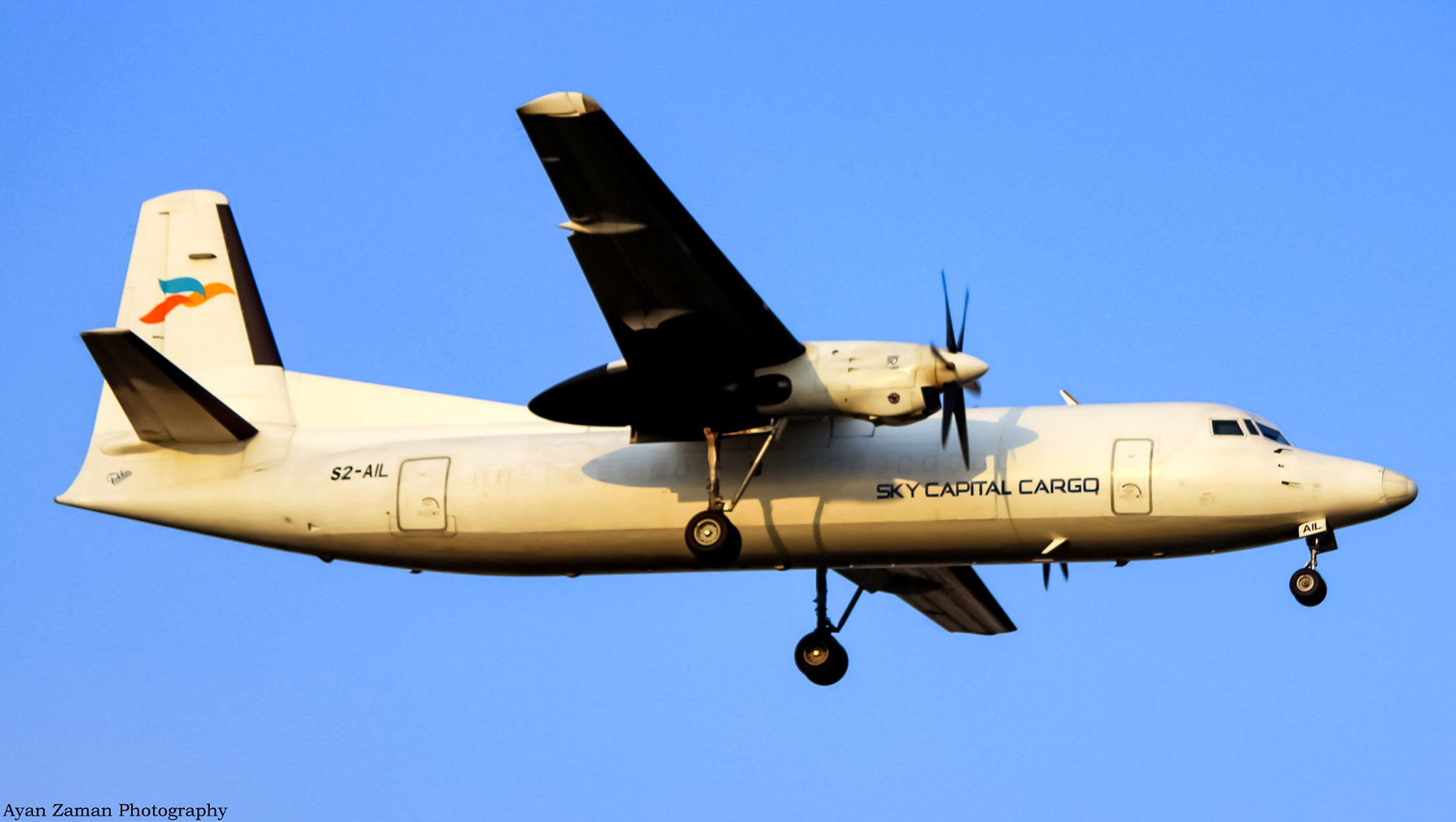
SkyAir Fokker 50

=== Current fleet ===
As of August 2025, SkyAir operates the following aircraft:

SkyAir fleet
Aircraft	In fleet	Orders
Boeing 737-200F	1	—
Fokker 50	2	—
Robinson R66	1	—
Total	4	—

=== Historic fleet ===
SkyAir previously also operated the following aircraft:

- 2 Lockheed L-1011F TriStar

== See also ==
- List of airlines of Bangladesh
