= Abdul Bismillah =

Indian novelist writing in Hindi

Abdul Bismillah (अब्दुल बिस्मिल्लाह born 5 July 1949) is an Indian novelist writing in Hindi, known for his short stories of life in Muslim rural communities. He was a professor in the Department of Hindi, Jamia Millia University and retired as a head of department. Bismillah's collection of stories Rough Rough Mail has been translated into French as Raf Raf Express.
