= Hello Airlines =

Bangladeshi cargo airline

IATA	ICAO	Call sign
H3	-	-
- Founded: 2012 (14 years ago)
- Commenced operations: 2017 (9 years ago)
- Hubs: Shahjalal International Airport
- Fleet size: 1
- Parent company: IPSSL Group
- Headquarters: Baridhara, Dhaka
- Key people: M. Haider Uzzaman (Chairman)
- Website: helloairlinesbd.com

Hello Airlines is a cargo airline from Bangladesh. It was founded in 2012 and commenced operations in 2017. The airline has its main hub at the Shahjalal International Airport and its fleet comprises one ATR 42-300 QC aircraft.

== Fleet ==
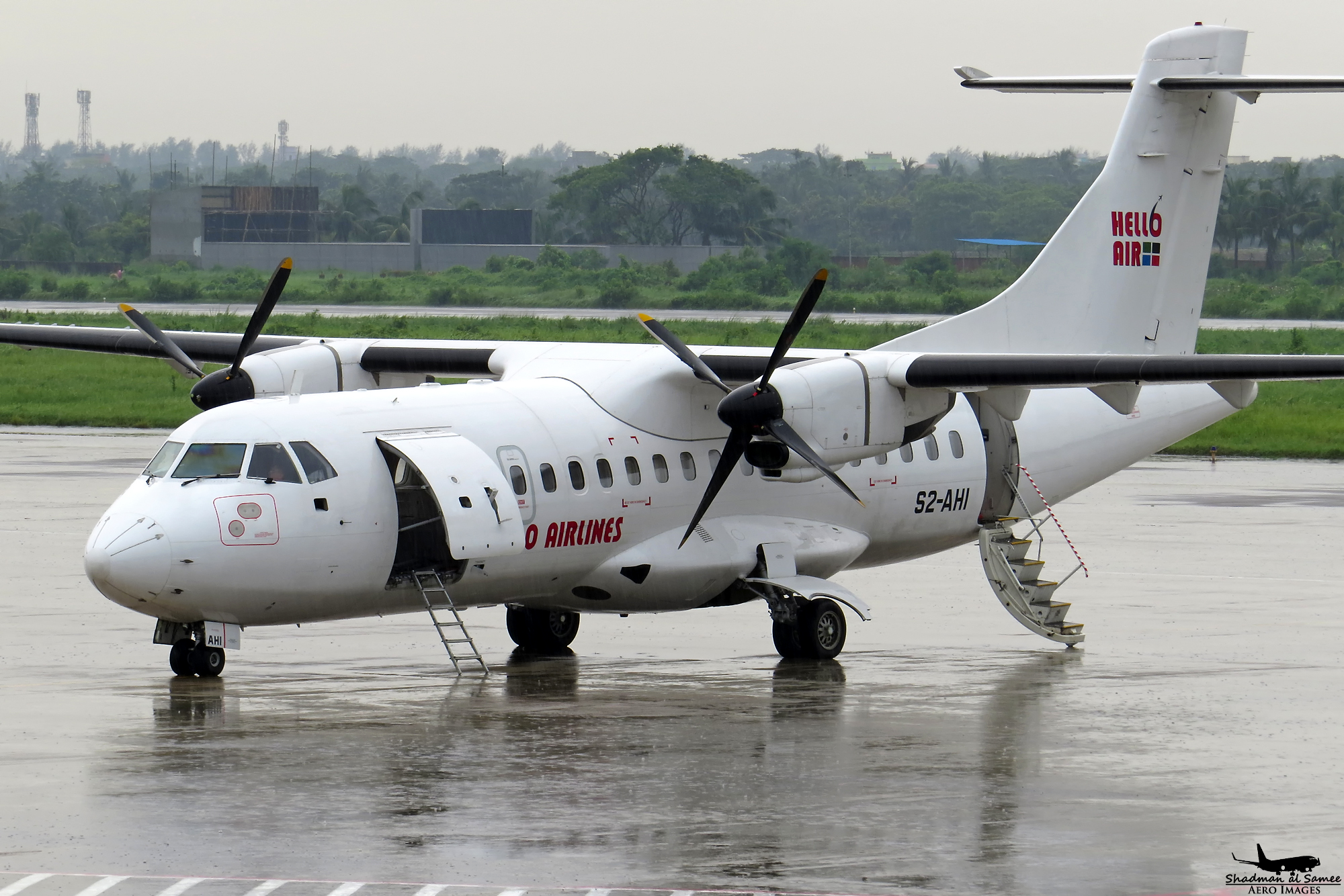
Hello Airlines ATR 42-300QC

As of November 2024, the Hello Airlines fleet consists of the following aircraft:

Hello Airlines fleet
Aircraft	In fleet	Orders	Notes
ATR 42-300QC	1	—	
Total	1	—	

== See also ==
- List of airlines of Bangladesh
