= Bismillah Airlines =

Bangladeshi cargo airline

IATA	ICAO	Call sign
5Z	BML	BISMILLAH
- Founded: 1998; 28 years ago
- Hubs: Shahjalal International Airport; Shah Amanat International Airport; Osmani International Airport
- Secondary hubs: Cox's Bazar Airport
- Fleet size: 2 on order
- Destinations: 16
- Parent company: Mollah Group of Industries
- Headquarters: Dhaka, Bangladesh
- Key people: M. A. Mannan
- Website: www.bismillahairlines.net

Bismillah Airlines (BML) is a cargo airline based in Bangladesh. It is the first international cargo carrier of Bangladesh.

== History ==
Bismillah Airlines was launched in 1998. It is the property of the Mollah Group of Industries. Bismillah Airlines is the first international cargo carrier in Bangladesh. In 1999, BML launched a commercial route between Bangkok and Dhaka with a Boeing 707.

In 2009, the Mollah Group opened the Bismillah Flying School, the first private flying school in the country. In 2010, Bismillah Airlines exported 120,000 tons worth of cargo goods, and imported 75,000 tons.

As of September 2015, Bismillah Airlines did not seem to have any active aircraft, but two Antonov An-148s were planned. In 2016, it expanded its cargo operations to the Hong Kong Airport.

In June 2023, Bismillah Airlines indicated it was looking to resume operating its own aircraft, saying it hoped to acquire Airbus A321P2F freighter aircraft on operating leases, with operations planned to start by the end of 3Q 2023. At the same time, the airline is also actively recruiting qualified and experienced A321 pilots and engineers.

== Fleet ==
=== Current fleet ===
The Bismillah Airlines fleet has no operational aircraft but they recently confirmed the orders of 2 Airbus A321XLR Freighters

=== Historical fleet ===
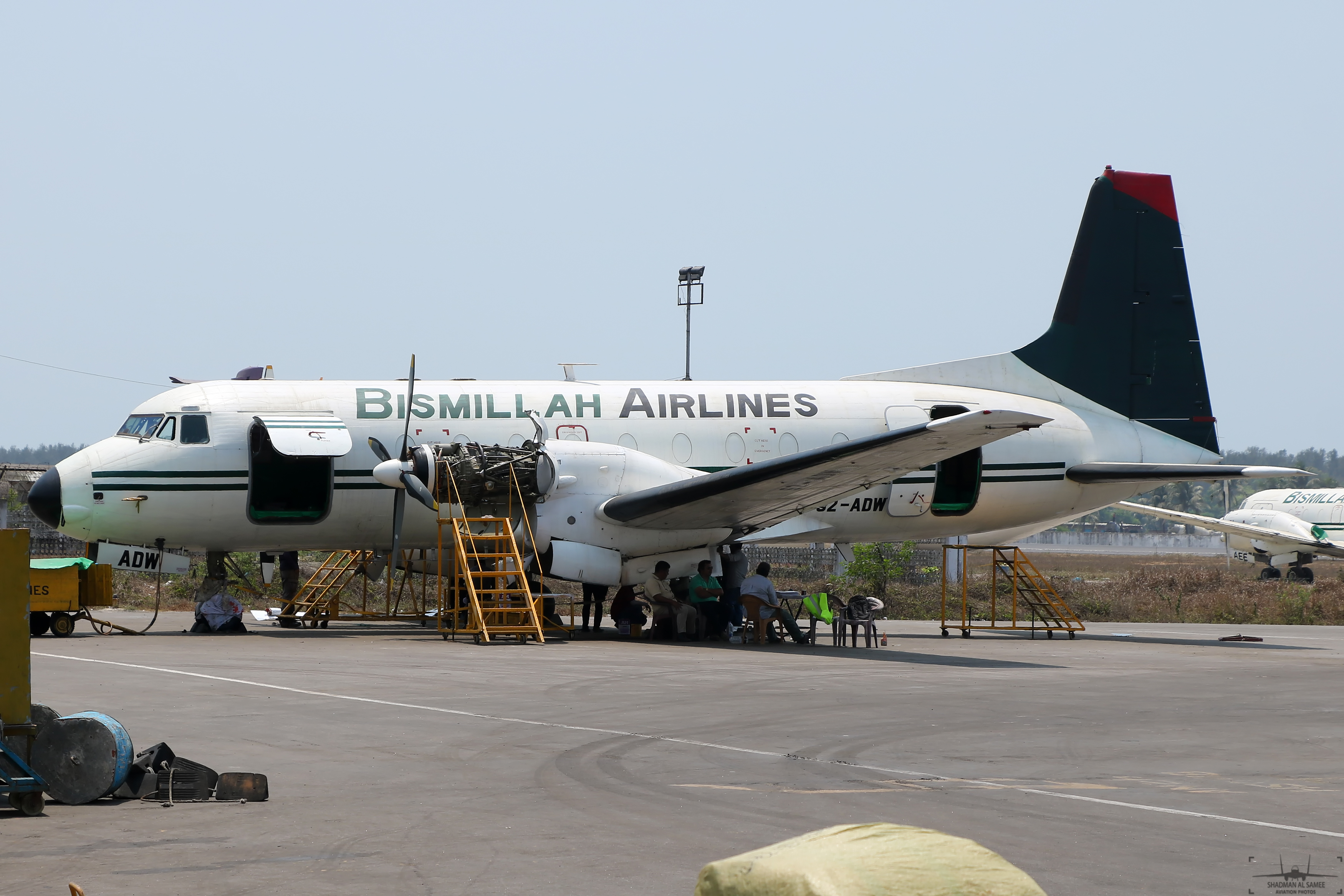
A former Bismillah Airlines Hawker Siddeley HS 748

The airline also operated the following aircraft which have since been retired:

- 1 Antonov An-8
- 3 Antonov AN-12
- 1 Antonov AN-26
- 1 Boeing 707-300
- 1 Boeing 727-200
- 2 Boeing 737-300
- 2 Boeing 747-200
- 1 Boeing 747-400
- 1 Douglas DC-8-62
- 2 Hawker Siddeley HS 748
- 1 Ilyushin IL-18
- 1 Ilyushin IL-76
- 1 Ilyushin IL-96
- 2 Lockheed L-1011 TriStar

== See also ==
- List of airlines of Bangladesh
