= Easy Fly Express =

Bangladeshi cargo airline

IATA	ICAO	Call sign
8E	EFX	EASY EXPRESS
- Founded: 18 April 2007 (19 years ago)
- Commenced operations: 18 July 2008 (18 years ago)
- Operating bases: Hazrat Shahjalal International Airport
- Secondary hubs: Cox's Bazar Airport
- Fleet size: 1
- Destinations: 6
- Parent company: Karnaphuli Group
- Headquarters: Dhaka
- Key people: Saber Hossain Chowdhury, (Chairman)
- Website: easyfly-express.com

Easy Fly Express is a cargo airline based in Dhaka, Bangladesh, with its main hub at Shahjalal International Airport. The airline was founded in 2007 and commenced operations on 1 July 2008.

== History ==
Easy Fly Express was founded on 18 April 2007, and received its first aircraft HS 748 (Reg: S2-AAX) on 7 May 2008. The aircraft was registered on 24 June 2008 and the airline commenced operations on 1 July 2008. In February 2014, Karnaphuli Group purchased 100% of the shares of the airlines. The airline operates domestic and international cargo flights.

The airline has been challenged by Monaco and London-based easyGroup, licensor of the easyJet brand, over its orange "easyFly" branding which is strikingly similar to that used by easyJet. An April 2019 "Brand Thief" statement by easyGroup indicated the Airbus A300 in question was no longer operated by Easy Fly Express and had been stripped of the contentious logo.

== Fleet ==
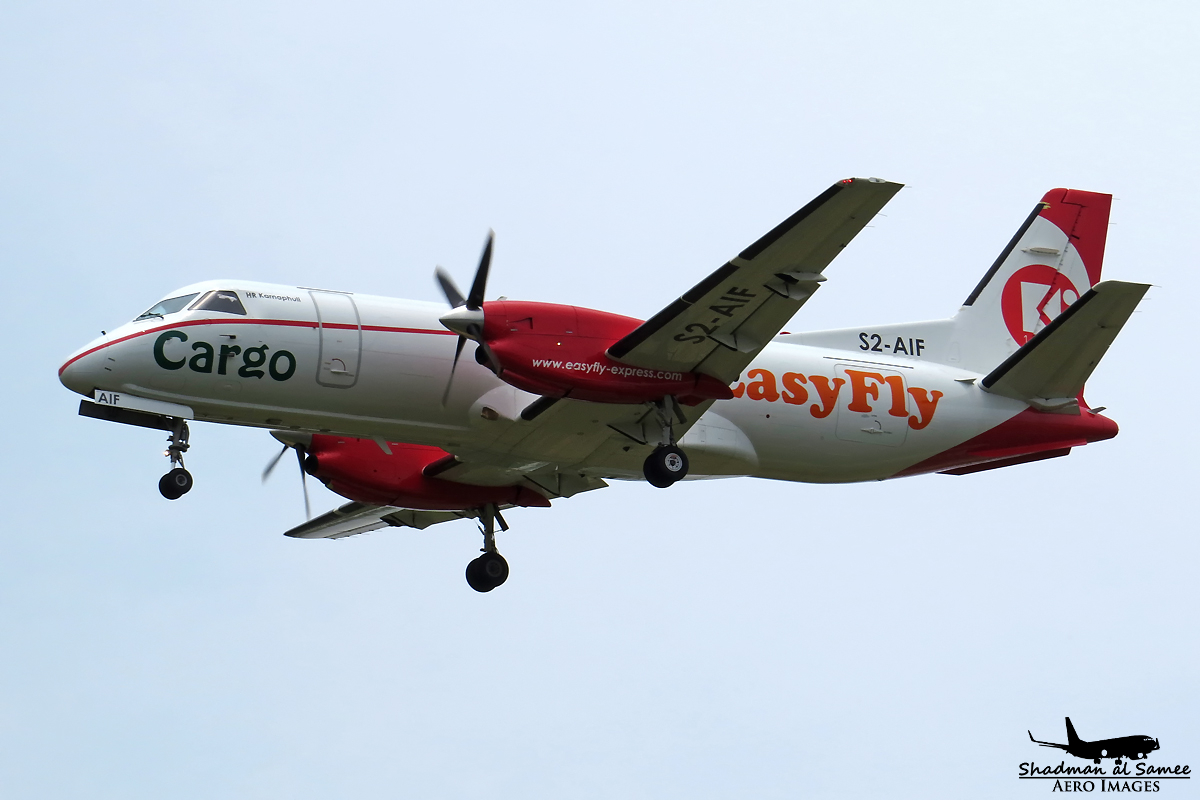
Easy Fly Express Saab 340F

As of February 2026, Easy Fly Express operates the following aircraft:

Easy Fly Express fleet
Aircraft	In fleet	Orders	Historic	Capacity	Notes
Airbus A300-600F	-	—	1	Cargo	
Saab 340F	1	—	—	Cargo	
Hawker Siddeley HS 748	—	—	1	Cargo	
Total	1	—	2		

== See also ==
- List of airlines of Bangladesh
