= Biman Bangladesh Airlines subsidiaries =

Subsidiaries of national carrier

Biman Bangladesh Airlines subsidiaries include a number of ancillary and maintenance facilities established to facilitate the operations of Biman Bangladesh Airlines, the national carrier of Bangladesh. Biman's subsidiaries are associated with aircraft ground handling, aviation engineering, aviation training and flight catering.

Among these wholly owned subsidiaries are Biman Flight Catering Centre; Biman Poultry Complex; Biman Ground Handling; Bangladesh Airlines Training Centre; and Biman Engineering.

== Commercial divisions ==
=== Biman Flight Catering Centre ===
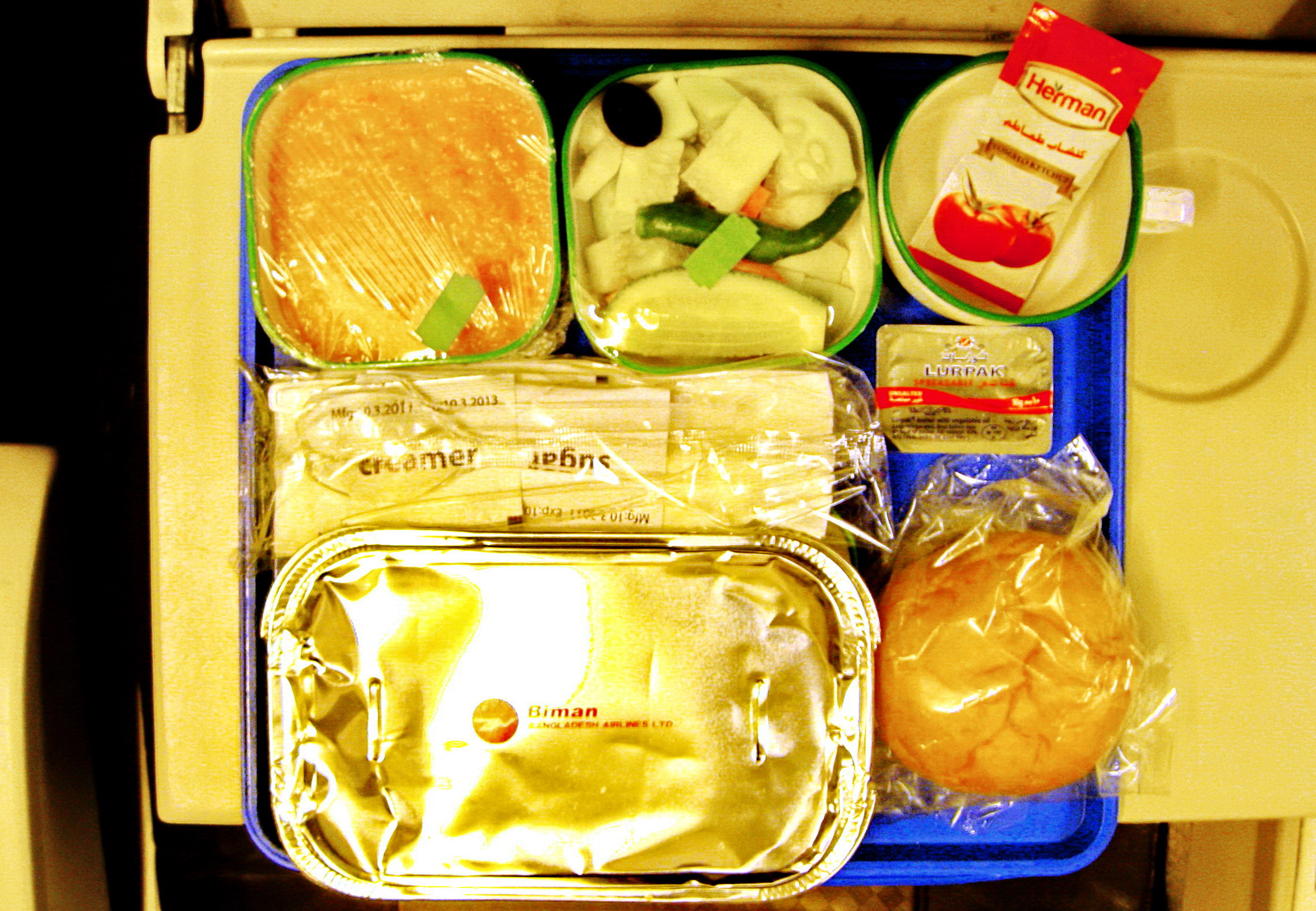
A meal by BFCC on an international Biman flight.

Biman Flight Catering Centre (BFCC) was set up in October 1989, to produce in-flight meals. It is one of Biman's most profitable operations; employing 2000 people. BFCC has the capacity to produce 14,000 meals a day. It provides full meals to Biman, Malaysia Airlines, Turkish Airlines, Egypt Air, and Jazeera Airways.

=== Biman Poultry Complex ===
The Biman Poultry Complex (BPC) is a poultry farming complex located 40 kilometres (25 mi) northwest of Dhaka City, in the Savar district. The complex encompasses 75 acres (300,000 m^{2}) of land including 5 acres (20,000 m^{2}) of poultry sheds, a 1-acre (4,000 m^{2}) residential area, and 69 acres (280,000 m^{2}) of agricultural land.

The poultry industry in Bangladesh was partly pioneered by the Biman subsidiary in the mid-1970s, although the first poultry in Bangladesh was a private venture named "Eggs and Hens" established in 1964. The medium-sized breeder set up by BPC eventually led to NGOs and the government coming forward to develop the sector in early 1990. Poultry now has "a significant role" in providing low-cost dietary protein to the Bangladesh population.

Bird flu was detected at one of the farms in March 2007, which resulted in many livestock being culled. This was the first incident of bird flu in Bangladesh.

== Other ==
=== Biman Ground Handling ===
Biman provides ground handling and cargo handling services to all airlines operating in Bangladesh, in all airports. Established along with Biman Bangladesh Airlines in 1972, it generated profits of BDT 4.5 billion in the FY 2011–2012, making it one of the most profitable subsidiary of Biman.

=== Bangladesh Airlines Training Center ===
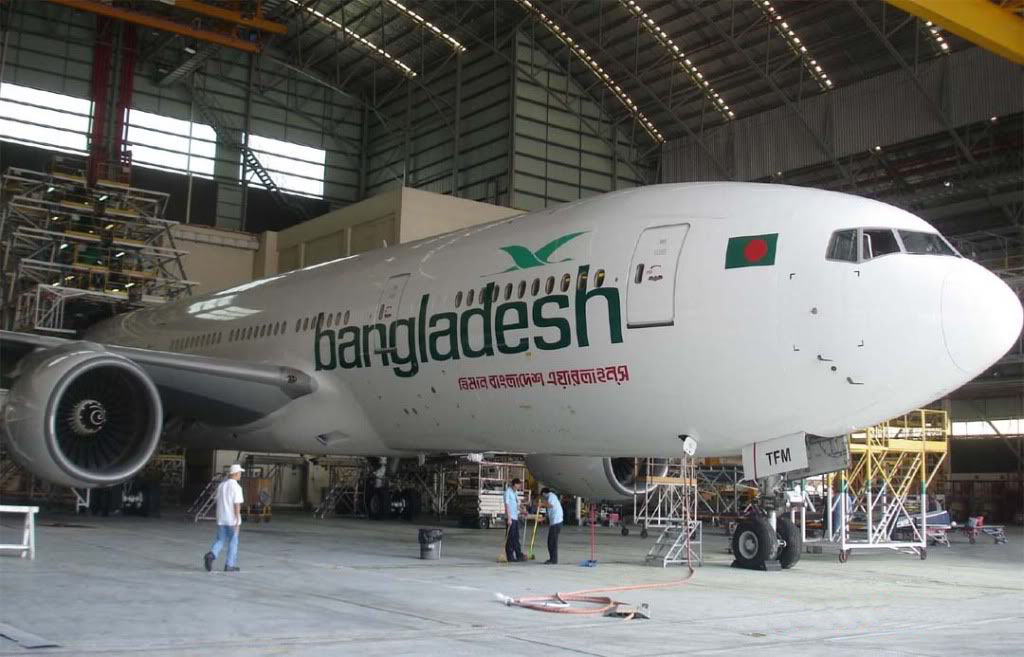
A leased Boeing 777-200ER in a Biman hangar at Shahjalal International Airport.

Biman Bangladesh Airlines Training Center (BATC) trains its ground, flight service and technical personnel to meet the growing needs of Biman's manpower. The center has also been turned into a seat of training and technical seminars for local travel agents and some foreign airlines.

=== Biman Engineering ===
The aviation engineering division of Biman Bangladesh Airlines was separated from the commercial division in 2004. This step was taken in order to turn engineering independently profitable from the commercial ventures listed above.

This subsidiary is located in Biman's Engineering Hangar at Shahjalal International Airport in Dhaka.
