= Kaniz Fatema Roksana =

Bangladeshi aviator

Kaniz Fatema Rokhsana
- কানিজ় ফাতেমা রোকসানা
- Born: Kaniz Fatema Rokhsana; February 26, 1955; Dhaka
- Died: August 5, 1984; Near Hazrat Shahjalal International Airport, Dhaka
- Cause of death: Plane crash
- Education: Eden Mohila College
- Known for: First female pilot of Biman Airlines
- Spouse: Syed Hasan Baqir

Syeda Kaniz Fatema Rokhsana (Bengali: সৈয়দা কানিজ় ফাতেমা রোকসানা, Bengali pronunciation: [ʃoi̯joda kaniz fatema roksana]; 26 February 1955 – 5 August 1984) was Bangladesh's Biman Airlines' first female pilot. She died on 5 August 1984 in a plane crash in a marsh near Shahjalal International Airport in Dhaka. With a total death toll of 49 people, it remains the deadliest aviation disaster on Bangladeshi soil. She was licensed as a commercial pilot in 1977.

== Early life and education ==
Rokhsana was born on 26 February 1955 in Dhaka. Her nickname was Titli. Her father and mother where Syed Waliullah and Syeda Sultana Razia respectively. She passed SSC from Kamrunnesa Government Girls' School in 1969 and HSC from Sher-e-Bangla Girls' College (formerly Nari Shiksha Mandir) in 1973. Later, she completed her BSC from Eden College in 1975. Rokhsana was equally skilled in Spanish, German, French, and English languages.

== Career ==
In 1976, Rokhsana enrolled at the Bangladesh Flying Club. In 1978, she obtained her commercial pilot's license. As a reward for her skill and courage, she was given the responsibility of an 'Instructor' at the Flying Club within two years. On 7 December 1978, she passed the Bangladesh Biman pilot recruitment test, but her appointment was delayed by the authorities because she was a woman. On 26 December 1979, she was appointed as Bangladesh's first female cadet pilot.

== Plane crash ==
Rokhsana was promoted from cadet pilot to first officer. On 4 August 1984, while landing at Dhaka Airport in a Fokker F-27 flight from the port city of Chittagong, she died in a plane crash due to rain-disrupted weather. In the same accident, 45 passengers and 4 crew members were killed. Among the dead were a British citizen, a Japanese citizen, and 33 Bangladeshis who had returned from the Middle East.

The domestic flight from Chittagong to Dhaka failed twice to locate the runway due to heavy rainfall. During the third landing attempt, the plane crashed into a wetland about 500 meters before the runway. The aircraft sank 20 to 25 feet underwater. In the tragedy, all 49 people on board — including 44 passengers, two pilots, and three crew — died. This remains the deadliest plane crash within Bangladesh.

== Family life ==
Rokhsana's husband was Syed Hasan Baqir. The couple had one son, Syed Shoaib Hasan Boni.

== See also ==
- 1984 Biman Bangladesh Airlines Fokker F27 crash
