= Biman Bangladesh Airlines Flight 426 =

1984 aviation accident in Bangladesh

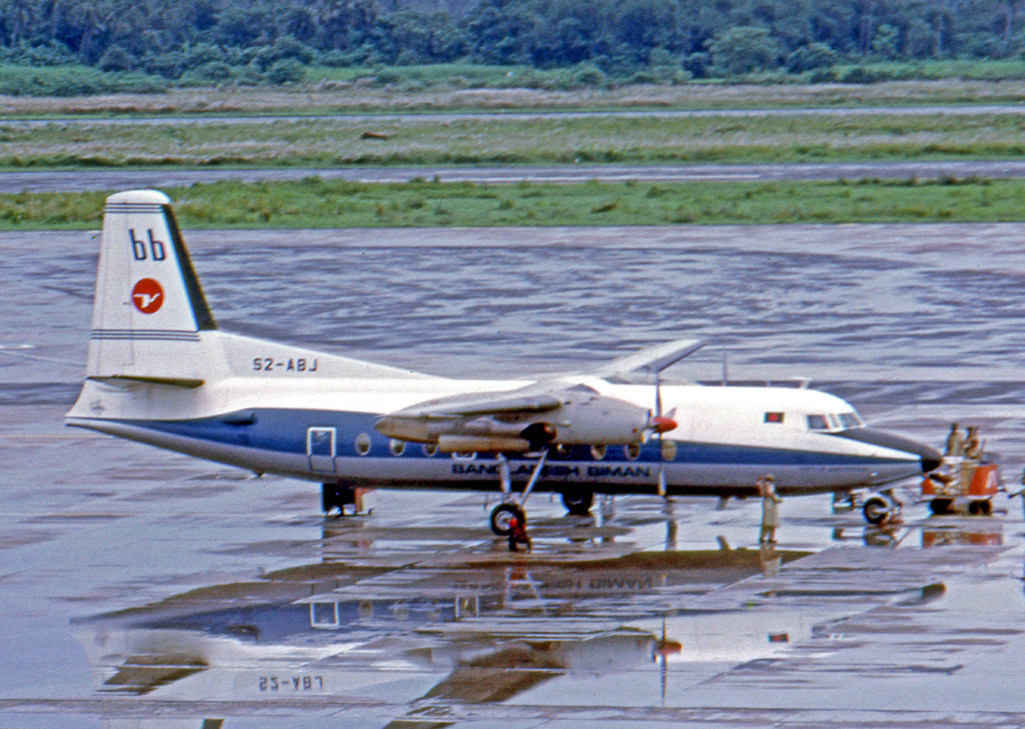
- S2-ABJ, the aircraft involved in the accident, seen in 1974

Accident
- Date: 5 August 1984
- Summary: Controlled flight into terrain in bad weather
- Site: near Zia International Airport Dhaka, Bangladesh; 23°51′36″N 90°22′57″E

Aircraft
- Aircraft type: Fokker F27-600
- Operator: Biman Bangladesh Airlines
- IATA flight No.: BG426
- ICAO flight No.: BBC426
- Call sign: BANGLADESH 426
- Registration: S2-ABJ
- Flight origin: Patenga Airport
- Destination: Zia International Airport
- Occupants: 49
- Passengers: 45
- Crew: 4
- Fatalities: 49
- Survivors: 0

Biman Bangladesh Airlines Flight 426 was a scheduled domestic passenger flight between Patenga Airport, Chittagong (now Shah Amanat International Airport) and Zia International Airport, Dhaka. On 5 August 1984, the aircraft operating the flight, a Biman Bangladesh Airlines Fokker F27-600 crashed into a marsh near Zia International Airport (now Hazrat Shahjalal International Airport) in Dhaka, Bangladesh while landing in poor weather. All 49 occupants (45 passengers, 4 crews) had died on crash, making it the second deadliest aviation accident involving a Bangladeshi airliner behind US-Bangla Airlines Flight 211 and the deadliest to happen inside Bangladeshi territory to date.

== Aircraft and crew ==
The aircraft, a Fokker F27-600 registered S2-ABJ, was manufactured in 1971. It first flew for Indian Airlines but it was given to Biman in 1972, as a part of all the support given to Bangladesh by the Government of India following Bangladesh's Independence. At the time of the accident, the aircraft had flown more than 24,000 cycles and more than 15,500 airframe hours.

The captain of the flight was Kayes Ahmed Majumdar, an experienced pilot who had logged 5,000 flying hours. The first officer was Kaniz Fatema Roksana, who was the first female commercial pilot of Bangladesh.

== Accident ==
The weather conditions in Dhaka were poor on the day of the accident; there was turbulence and heavy rain made visibility very poor. Amid these conditions, the crew first attempted a VOR approach to Zia International Airport's runway 32. As the runway was not spotted by either crew member, a missed approach was executed. The crew then tried an ILS approach on runway 14 of the same airport, but a missed approach had to be executed again as both pilots had failed to spot the runway once again. On the crew's third approach (second on runway 14), the plane got too low while it was still several hundred meters from the runway but neither crew member realized this (due to the poor visibility) and the plane crashed into a swamp about 550 meters short of the runway. (Note: It was also stated that the aircraft crashed beyond the runway, but considering the crash location (north west of Dhaka) and the fact that the flight was approaching runway 14 of DAC (approach is from north west of Dhaka city), it is clear that the plane crashed short of the runway and not beyond it.)

== Passengers ==
There were a total of 45 passengers and 4 crew members on board the flight, all of whom perished in the crash. There was one British and one Japanese among the passengers, and the rest were Bangladeshi. Thirty-three of the passengers were traveling to Dhaka to catch connecting flights to the Middle East.
