= Kaizer Sohel Ahmed =

Bangladeshi aviation executive

MD & CEO of Biman Bangladesh Airlines
- Incumbent
- Assumed office 7 April 2026
- Preceded by: Shafiqur Rahman

Personal details
- Education: Sylhet Cadet College; Bangladesh Air Force Academy; Institute of Business Administration, University of Dhaka

Military service
- Branch/service: Bangladesh Air Force
- Years of service: 1987-1997
- Rank: Squadron Leader

Kaizer Sohel Ahmed is a Bangladeshi aviation professional and former Air Force Officer. He received widespread media attention after being appointed the managing director of Biman Bangladesh Airlines, the flag-carrier of Bangladesh.

== Education and military career ==
Ahmed completed his HSC from Sylhet Cadet College in 1985. He earned a Bachelor of Science in Aeronautics upon being commissioned from the Bangladesh Air Force Academy in 1987.

He later earned a Master of Business Administration (MBA) degree from DU IBA in 1997. After serving in the Air Force for 10 years, he voluntarily retired to pursue a career in the private sector.

== Professional career and Biman tenure ==
After leaving the military, Ahmed served in multiple roles within Chevron Bangladesh over a 28-year period.

In April 2026, as part of a wider reconstiution of the Biman Bangladesh board, he was made managing director and CEO. As CEO of Biman, he signed an agreement with Boeing for the delivery of 14 aircraft. This order was the largest single aircraft order in Biman's history.
