= Biman Bangladesh Airlines =

National airline of Bangladesh

Biman Bangladesh Airlines বিমান বাংলাদেশ এয়ারলাইন্স

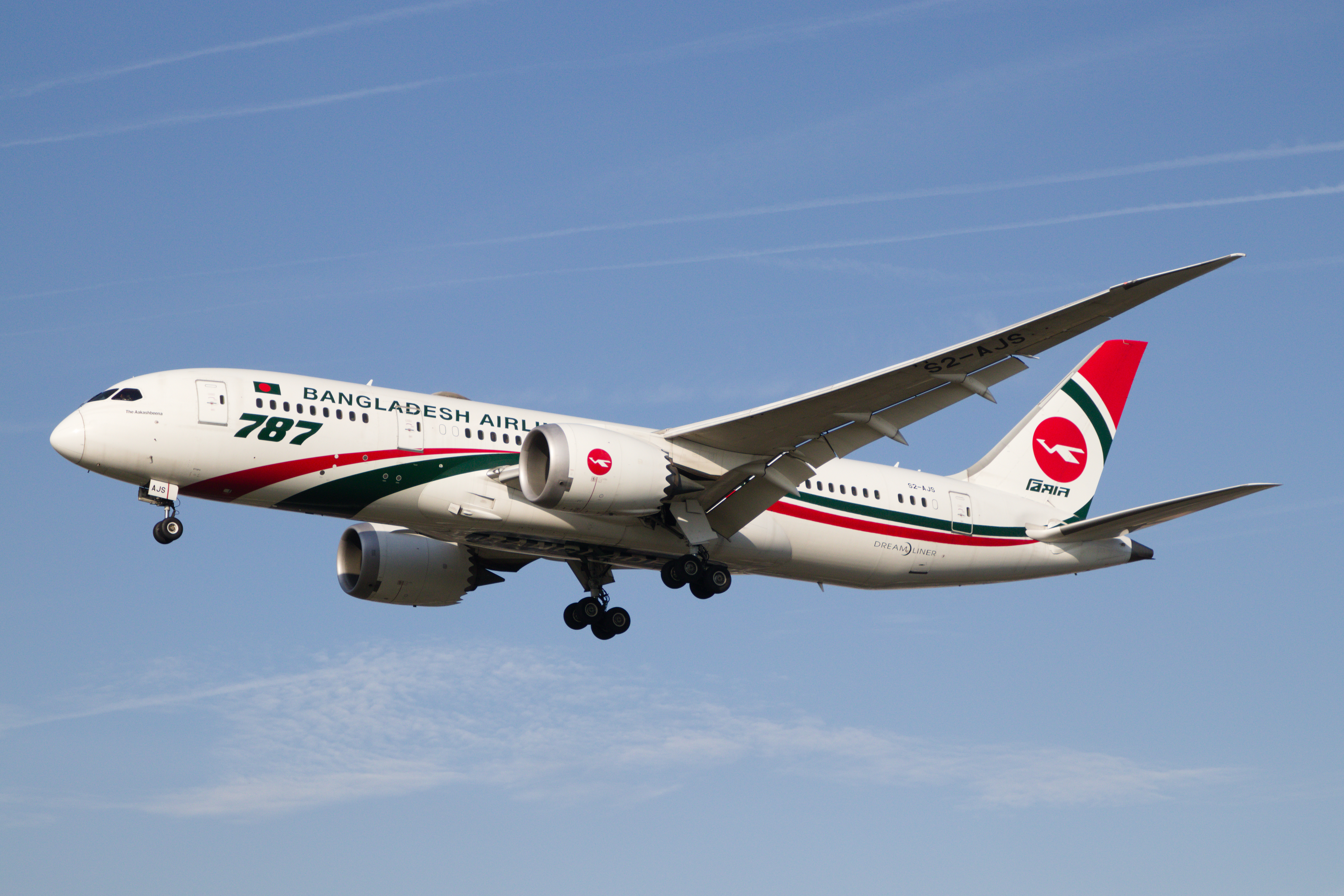
- Biman Bangladesh Airlines Boeing 787-8
| IATA | ICAO | Call sign |
|---|---|---|
| BG | BBC | BANGLADESH |
- Founded: 4 January 1972; 54 years ago
- Commenced operations: 4 February 1972; 54 years ago
- Hubs: Hazrat Shahjalal International Airport
- Secondary hubs: Shah Amanat International Airport; Osmani International Airport
- Frequent-flyer program: Biman Loyalty Club
- Subsidiaries: Biman Flight Catering Centre; Biman Poultry Complex; Biman Ground Handling; Bangladesh Airlines Training Center
- Fleet size: 19
- Destinations: 30
- Headquarters: Dhaka, Bangladesh
- Key people: Rumee A Hossain (chairman); Kaizer Sohel Ahmed (CEO and MD)
- Revenue: ▲৳6900.5 crore (US$560 million) (FY 2021-22)
- Operating income: ▼৳2653.7 crore (US$220 million) (FY 2021-22)
- Net income: ▲৳1179.2 crore (US$96 million) (FY 2021-22)
- Profit: ▲৳435.56 crore (US$35 million) (FY 2021-22)
- Total assets: ▲৳16377.8 crore (US$1.3 billion) (FY 2021-22)
- Total equity: ▲৳2138.36 crore (US$170 million) (FY 2021-22)
- Website: www.biman-airlines.com

Biman Bangladesh Airlines, (Note: Bengali: বিমান বাংলাদেশ এয়ারলাইন্স, romanized: Bimān Baṅladeś Eẏarlains, IPA: [ˈbiman ˈbaŋlaˌd̪eʃ ˈeaɾlai̯ns]) commonly known as Biman (/ˈbiːmɑːn/ BEE-mahn; Bengali: [ˈbiman]), (Note: The name Biman, a Bengali word for 'airplane', is derived from the Sanskrit word Vimana, meaning 'flying palace; chariot'.) is the flag carrier of Bangladesh. With its main hub at Hazrat Shahjalal International Airport in Dhaka, the airline also operates flights from its secondary hubs at Shah Amanat International Airport in Chittagong and Osmani International Airport in Sylhet. The airline provides international passenger and cargo services to multiple destinations and has air service agreements in 42 countries. The headquarters of the airline, Balaka Bhaban, is located in Kurmitola, in the northern part of Dhaka. Annual Hajj flights, transporting tourists, migrants, and non-resident Bangladeshi workers and the activities of its subsidiaries form an integral part of the corporate business of the airline.

Created in February 1972, Biman enjoyed an internal monopoly in the aviation industry of Bangladesh for 24 years, until 1996. In the decades following its founding, the airline expanded its fleet and destinations but it was adversely affected by corruption and mismanagement. At its peak, Biman operated flights to 29 international destinations, extending from New York City in the west to Tokyo in the east. The airline was wholly owned and managed by the government of Bangladesh until 23 July 2007, when it was transformed into the country's largest public limited company by the Caretaker Government of Bangladesh. Since becoming a public limited company in 2007, the airline has reduced staff and begun to modernize its fleet. The airline had signed a deal with Boeing to buy ten new aircraft and options for ten more in 2008. After taking delivery of the new planes, Biman expanded its destinations and added in-flight amenities such as onboard internet, WiFi, mobile telephony and live TV streams.

Biman Bangladesh Airlines is certified as safe to fly in Europe by the European Union Aviation Safety Agency. In addition, Biman has also successfully passed the IATA Operational Safety Audit and since then, the airline has resumed flights to some of its previous destinations in Asia and Europe. In recent times, Biman Bangladesh Airlines has seen a marked improvement in punctuality, as well as in on-time flight performance, under its new management team.

== History ==
Biman Bangladesh Airlines was established on 4 January 1972 as Bangladesh's national airline under the Bangladesh Biman Ordinance (Presidential Order No. 126). The initiative to launch the flag carrier was taken by 2,500 former employees, including ten Boeing 707 commanders and seven other former pilots of Pakistan International Airlines, who submitted a proposal to the government on 31 December 1971 following the independence of Bangladesh. The airline was initially called Air Bangladesh but was soon changed to Biman Bangladesh Airlines, its current name.

Biman Aircraft S2-AKE De Havilland Canada DHC-8-402 Dash 8 Q400

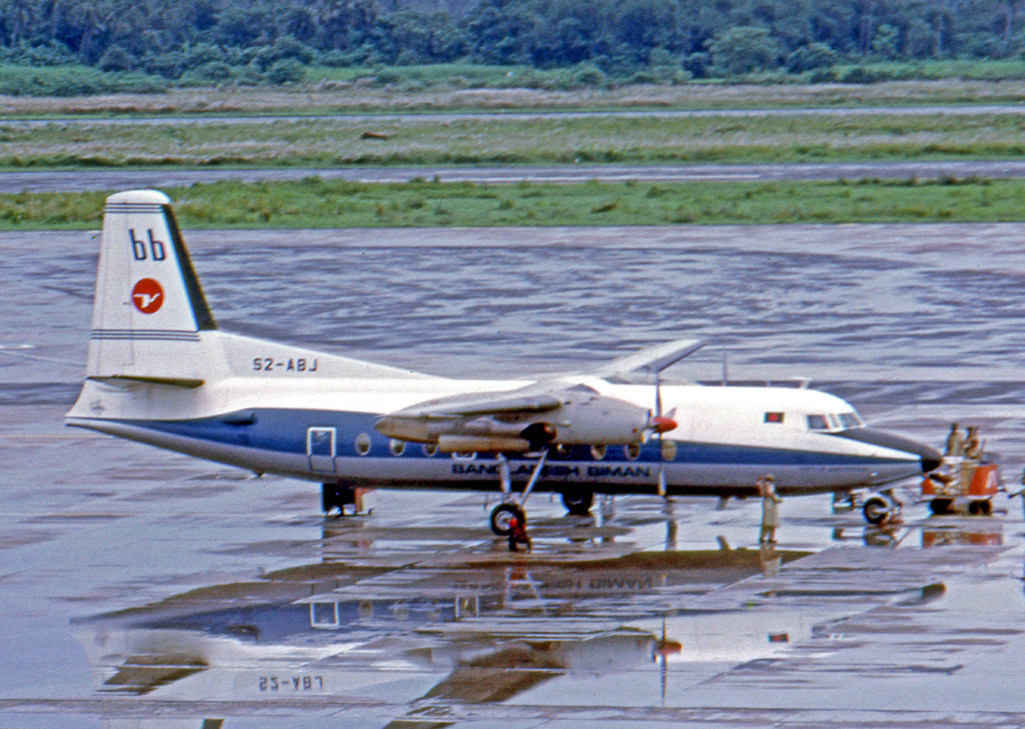
Fokker F27 Friendship of Biman Bangladesh Airlines at Dum Dum Airport in 1974

On 4 February 1972, Biman started its domestic services, initially linking Dhaka with Chittagong, Jessore and Sylhet, using a single Douglas DC-3 acquired from India. Following the crash of this DC-3 on 10 February 1972, near Dhaka, during a test flight, two Fokker F27s belonging to Indian Airlines and supplied by the Government of India entered the fleet as a replacement. Shortly afterwards, additional capacity was provided with the incorporation of a Douglas DC-6, loaned by the World Council of Churches, which was in turn replaced with another Douglas DC-6, a DC-6B model leased from Troll-Air, to operate the Dhaka-Calcutta route. On 4 March 1972, Biman started its international operations with a weekly flight to London using a Boeing 707 chartered from British Caledonian. The short haul fleet was supplemented by a Fokker F27 from India on 3 March 1972; the aircraft was employed on a daily scheduled flight between Calcutta and Dhaka on 28 April 1972. Three additional Fokker F27s were acquired during March and September of that year. In the first year of operation, Biman operated 1,079 flights carrying just over 380,000 passengers.

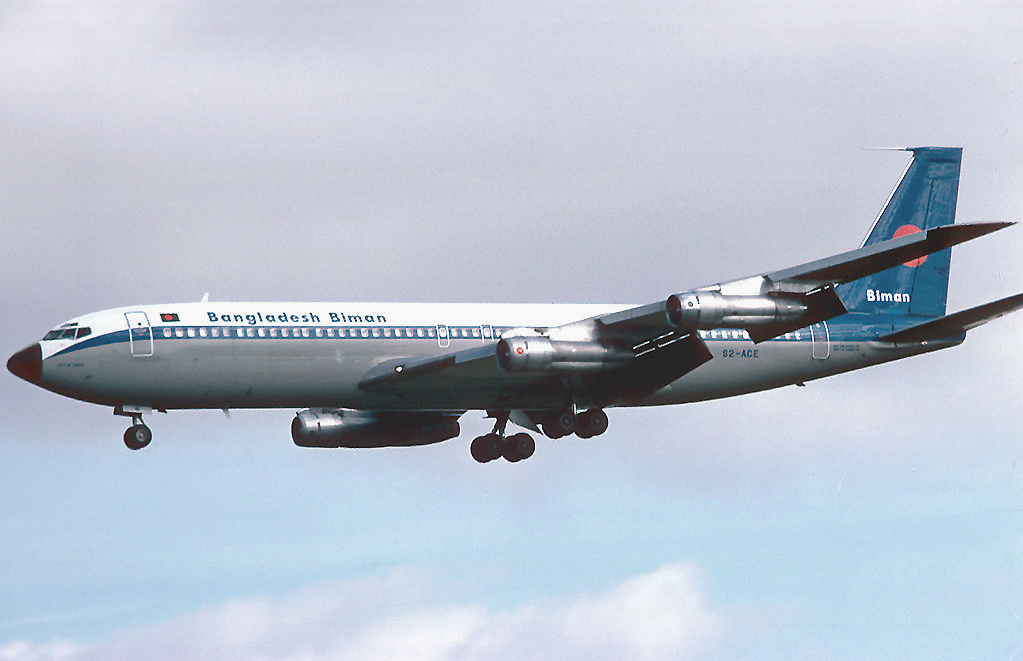
A Biman Bangladesh Airlines Boeing 707-320C, 1981

Four Fokker F27s joined the fleet in 1973, enabling Biman to double the frequency of the Kolkata flight to a twice daily service. A Boeing 707 was added to the fleet in September and the flight to London became twice-weekly, while a Chittagong–Kolkata flight also began operating. In 1974, operations were extended to Kathmandu (February), Bangkok (November) and Dubai (December). In 1976, Biman sold two of its Fokker F27s and bought another Boeing 707 to extend international services to Abu Dhabi, Karachi and Mumbai. Singapore was added to Biman's list of international destinations, when a third Boeing 707 was purchased in February 1977, followed by Jeddah, Doha and Amsterdam the following year, which also saw the purchase of its fourth Boeing 707. In 1977, Biman was converted into a public sector corporation to be governed by a board of directors appointed by the government. The airline broke even for the first time in 1977–78, and made a profit the following year. International destinations expanded to include Kuala Lumpur, Athens, Muscat and Tripoli in 1979, followed by Yangon, Tokyo and Dhahran in 1980. Biman took delivery of its first 85-seater Fokker F28-4000 in 1981. In 1983, three Douglas DC-10s joined the fleet and the airline started to phase out the Boeing 707s. The flight network expanded further to include Baghdad (1983), Paris (1984) and Bahrain (1986). On 5 August 1984, Biman faced its worst accident ever when a Fokker F27 flying in from Chittagong crashed near Dhaka, killing all 49 on board. The long haul fleet was then supplemented by the purchase of two new Airbus A310s in 1996, followed by the addition of two more in 2000, from Singapore Airlines and Air Jamaica, and another in 2003.

== Corporate affairs ==
=== Key people ===
Retired Senior Secretary Mostafa Kamal Uddin replaced former Senior Secretary Sajjadul Hassan, who had completed his term, as the chairman of the airline in January 2023. Additional secretary to the government Shafiul Azim is the chief executive officer (CEO) and managing director (MD). Previously, Kevin John Steele, who served as MD and CEO of Biman from March 2013 to April 2014, was the first foreign national in the airline's history to be appointed CEO and MD of Biman. He was chosen from a pool of 42 local and foreign candidates after a competitive selection process. Steele was a British citizen who had many years of experience working in management and administrative positions at British Airways and other airlines around the world. Steele resigned from Biman's MD and CEO positions in December 2013 citing health issues. Steele left office on 19 April 2014. Kyle Haywood took office as Biman's MD and CEO on 5 January 2015. A British national, Haywood was the second foreign national to hold the airline's CEO position after Kevin Steele.

=== Ownership ===
The airline was wholly owned by the Bangladeshi government through the Bangladesh Biman Corporation since its inception. In 1977, Biman was converted into a public sector corporation which afforded Biman limited autonomy, led by a government-appointed board of directors. The authorised share capital was increased to BDT 2 billion in 1987, and Biman was transformed into a public limited company, the largest in Bangladesh, in 2007.

=== Privatization ===
==== 1980s ====
During the late 1980s, Hossain Mohammad Ershad, President of Bangladesh at the time, served as president of Biman. After an early period of expansion and growth, Biman entered an era of nose-diving profits and slow growth, exacerbated by incompetent and corrupt management, who padded purchases, falsified repair bills, and kept unprofitable routes in operation for political reasons. Research conducted in 1996 found that Biman had 5,253 non-flying personnel, 30 percent more than Singapore Airlines, a carrier who operated a fleet almost ten times the size of Biman's. The report described Biman as "poorly managed, overstaffed, under-capitalized, and subject to excessive political interference in its day-to-day management."

==== 1990s ====
In the 1992–93 fiscal year, accounts under the Ministry of Civil Aviation and Tourism revealed that BDT 22 million in tax was not paid to the government. The audit carried out in 1999, also showed that Biman was owed BDT 2.2 million by travel agents from the proceeds of ticket sales, most likely with the collusion of Biman officials. Additionally, BDT 2.4 million was overpaid as incentive commissions to the sales agents in violation of Biman policies. In 2007, the caretaker government launched an anti-corruption drive. This was shortly followed by the forced retirement of 35 other employees and officials, some of whom were close aides of Shamim Iskander. In 2008, Iskander, younger brother of former premier Khaleda Zia, was sent to jail over charges of concealing information regarding his wealth and not for his connection with Biman.

Faced with growing losses from the late 1990s onwards, the government offered 40 percent of Biman to foreign airlines in 2004, hoping a buyer would take over the management of the carrier. However, the proposal demanded that many decision-making rights remain within the Bangladesh government, and the offer was ignored by outside airlines. A similar initiative in 1998 cost Biman $1.6 million in consultancy fees with no positive results.

==== 2000s ====
In the 2005–06 fiscal year, Biman carried 1.15 million passengers, a growth of 70% over the previous decade. With the rise of private domestic carriers in Bangladesh, however, Biman's market share for domestic passengers dropped by 35% over the previous ten years' average, with only 162,000 passengers travelling with Biman in the domestic sector in the 2005–06 fiscal year. During the same period, Biman reported its biggest annual loss of over US$120 million (BDT 8.3 billion as of 2010), with a US$100 million (BDT 6.9 billion as of 2010) loss reported the following year. Biman also fell behind on millions of dollars in payments to its fuel supplier, the Bangladesh Petroleum Corporation (BPC), with debts that rose to BDT 15.64 billion in late December 2006.

==== Public limited company ====
In May 2007, the caretaker government approved plans to turn Biman into a public limited company with shareholdings split between seven public sector organisations. As a part of the restructuring, the government put in place a voluntary retirement scheme (VRS) to reduce the man-equipment ratio (MER) of 367:1 (ratio of manpower to aircraft). The industry average at the time was 200:1, and other Asian airlines operated with MERs of about 150:1. The VRS provided compensation based on length of service, at a cost to the government of over BDT 2.97 billion borrowed from the World Bank. Biman management expected to reduce its workforce by 1,600, but 2,162 applications were received, many from employees who expected to be dismissed with little or no severance pay if the quota was not met. Biman accepted between 1,863 and 1877 applications, and affirmed that key personnel would not be allowed to leave the organisation via VRS.

On 23 July 2007, Biman Bangladesh Airlines became the largest public limited company in Bangladesh. Earlier suggestions that the airline should be renamed Bangladesh Airlines were rejected. The government is the sole shareholder of the 1.5 billion shares, but intends to offer 49 percent to the private sector while retaining majority ownership. The previous managing director, Dr. Abdul Momen, was appointed as the chief executive officer (CEO) and managing director of the new organisation. The six directors were appointed from the ministries of energy, commerce, finance, civil aviation, foreign affairs, and the cabinet division, with the cabinet secretary taking on the role as chairman of the board of directors. The six secretaries and a joint secretary to the civil aviation ministry were made the seven shareholders of the new PLC. In September 2008, the government appointed Air Commodore Zahed Kuddus (retd) to replace Dr. Momen as CEO. From 2002 to 2005 Kuddus had been chair of the Civil Aviation Authority of Bangladesh (CAAB), before which he had held various posts in the Bangladesh Air Force.

Following the privatisation, an initiative was launched by ex-Biman employees, who left the organisation via the VRS, to set up a competing airline. Names proposed for the airline included Air Bangla International, Biman Employees Airlines and Balaka. They were joined by previous managing directors of Biman, along with the former president of the Bangladesh Airline Pilots' Association. However, nothing further was heard of regarding the proposed venture.

The airline made profits in FY 2007–08 (BDT 60 million) and FY 2008–09 (BDT 150 million); In FY 2009–10, however, the carrier incurred in a net loss of BDT 800 million.

==== 2010s ====
In FY 2010–11 it made losses of BDT 2 billion, despite the government exempting it a debt of about BDT 11.94 billion and BDT 5.73 billion owed to the BPC and the CAAB, respectively. In FY 2011–12 it made a loss of BDT 6.06 billion (US$75 million); in FY 2012–13 unaudited figures show a loss of BDT 2 billion. At December 2013, Biman owed BDT 15.60 billion to different sources; of which BDT 3676.2 million to CAAB and BDT 8.50 billion to Padma Oil Company, its fuel supplier. Biman made three consecutive profits of BDT3.24 billion, BDT2.76 billion and BDT1.51 billion for FYs 2014–15, 2015–16 and 2016–17, respectively. The net profit for FY 2016–17 was BDT470 million. In the FY 2017–18 Biman had an operating income of ৳4931 crore (US$400 million) but having an expense of ৳5133 crore (US$420 million), it incurred a loss of ৳-202 crore (US$−16 million). But in the FY 2018–19 its operating income and expenses both decreased to ৳3175 crore (US$260 million) and ৳2938 crore (US$240 million) respectively and Biman earned a net profit of ৳237 crore (US$19 million).

=== Subsidiaries ===
Biman's subsidiaries are associated with aircraft ground handling, aviation engineering, aviation training and flight catering. There are five wholly owned subsidiaries, including:

| Company | Main activity | Founded |
|---|---|---|
| Biman Ground Handling (BGH) | Aircraft ground handling | 1972 |
| Biman Engineering | Aviation engineering | 2004 |
| Bangladesh Airlines Training Centre (BATC) | Aviation training | 1972 |
| Biman Flight Catering Centre (BFCC) | Flight catering | 1989 |
| Biman Poultry Complex (BPC) | Poultry farming complex | 1980 |

Since 1972, BGH provides ground-handling services for all airports in Bangladesh; the company reported a profit of BDT 4.5 billion for the FY 2011–12. The wholly owned subsidiary BFCC was set up in 1989 to provide in-flight meals. It is one of Biman's profitable operations, supplying food to Saudia, Etihad, Malaysia Airlines, Thai Airways, Emirates, China Southern Airlines and Regent Airways, along with casual orders from other airlines operating into Bangladesh. The BFCC consumes 90% of the eggs and chickens from the BPC, another profit-making subsidiary of Biman formed in 1976 and put into operation in November 1980 to rear poultry at farms in Dhaka. Bird flu was detected at one of the farms in March 2007, and many of the birds were culled. This was the first incident of bird flu in Bangladesh.

== Services ==
In 2013, Biman signed agreements with SITA and Mercator to provide infrastructure support and revenue accounting services to the airline. In 2014, Biman launched an advanced seat reservation system on its website. The airline also offers an online meal selection option, where the passenger can choose from diabetic meals, vegetarian meals, Asian vegetarian meals, child meals and Muslim meals, that will be served on board. In collaboration with a third-party service provider, Biman allows passengers to request Business Class upgrades as well as adjacent extra seats after booking an economy class fare.

=== Flight classes ===
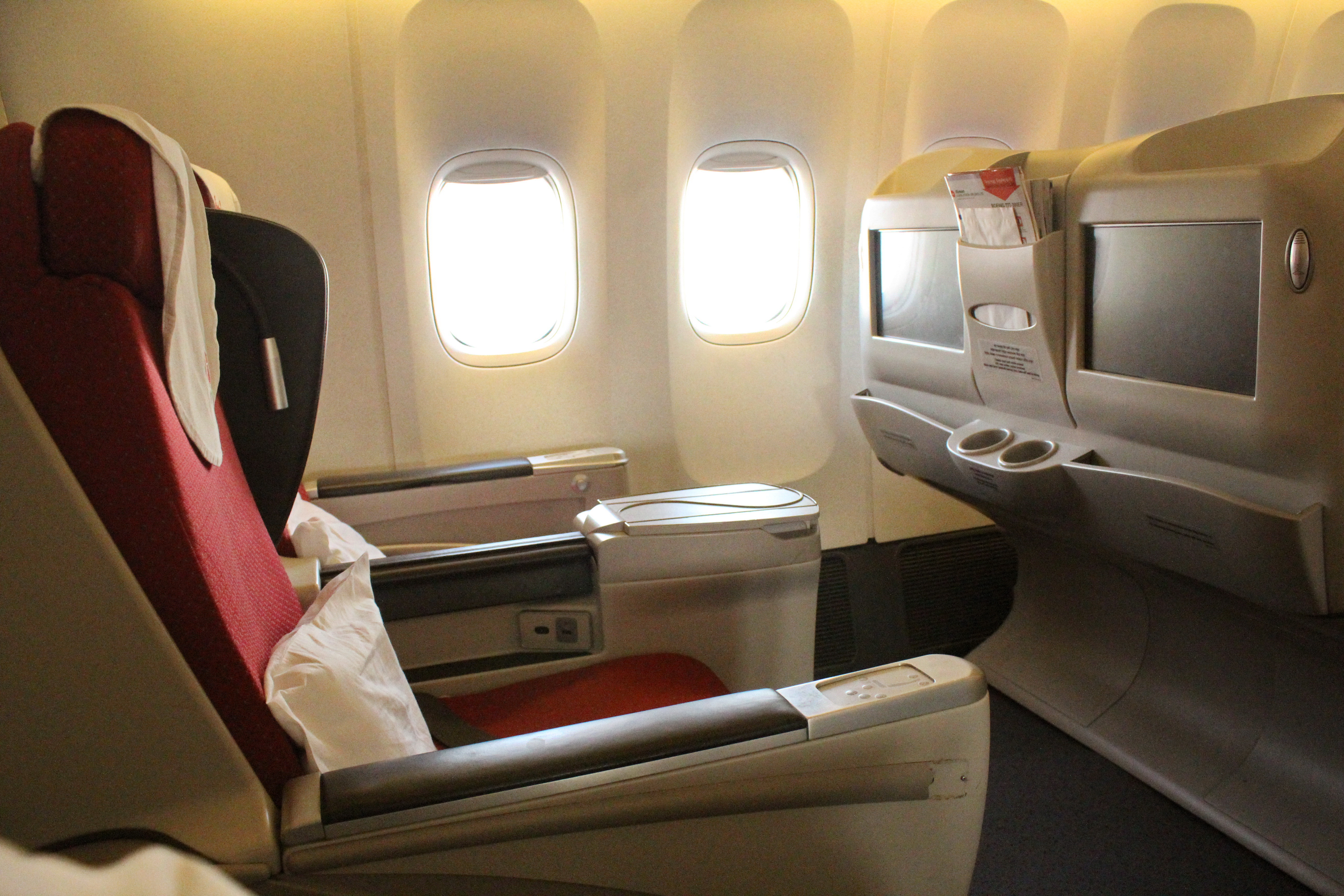
Interior of business class cabin of Biman Bangladesh Airlines Boeing 777-300ER en route to Dhaka from Jeddah.

A two-class service (J and Y) is operated on most of Biman's aircraft. The Business Class cabin on its Boeing 777 is arranged in a 2–3–2 configuration, while economy class cabin is set up in a 3–3–3 configuration. Biman has two types of Business Class layout in its Boeing 787. The 787-8 variant has its Business Class cabin arranged in a 2-2-2 configuration. On the other hand, the Business Class cabin on the 787-9 variant is set up in a more comfortable 1-2-1 configuration. All 787s have their Economy class cabin arranged in a 3-3-3 configuration. Also, the 787-9s on its fleet are the first to introduce a Premium Economy class into Biman's service. The narrow-body Boeing 737-800's Business Class is set up in a 2–2 configuration while Economy Class is in a 3–3 arrangement. Business Class passengers of Biman Bangladesh Airlines have exclusive access to airport and hotel lounges around the globe.

=== In-flight amenities ===
Biman relaunched its inflight magazine and re-branded as Bihanga in September 2013. The bi-monthly magazine, previously known as Diganta, and before that Jatri, is published by Subcontinental Media Group. The magazine is available in both Bengali and English, covering topics about Bangladesh and Biman's destinations. English and Bengali language newspapers are also available in Business Class on board the aircraft. Biman launched in-flight duty-free sales in March 2014, branded as Biman Boutique. Duty-free products include perfumes, cosmetics, jewellery, watches, children's gifts, chocolates, tobacco, etc. In 2014, Biman launched amenity kits for children on-board which include colouring books, stationery, dolls and jigsaw puzzle. Biman doesn't usually serve alcoholic beverages on its flights in economy class, however, Business Class passengers have exclusive access to lounges around the globe.

The newer Boeing 777s and 787s are equipped with modern in-flight entertainment systems. Every seat is fitted with personal touch screen displays which are loaded with movies, songs and games. It also has high-resolution moving maps and live flight information. All this is available in two languages – English and Bengali.

Starting with the newly delivered Boeing 787 Dreamliners, Biman Bangladesh Airlines launched onboard Internet, WiFi, mobile telephony, movie streaming and live TV streaming services in September 2018 in most of the new planes in its fleet. Twenty-five satellites were deployed for this purpose. New Panasonic eX3 seat-back monitors with touch screens from Panasonic Avionics offer passengers more than one hundred on-demand movies, music and video games. Onboard touch screen 3D route-maps, the latest addition to the aviation industry, show the various structures of the territories the aircraft flies over. Since March 2017, Biman started to offer new meal and beverage options in its flights, including diabetic and children's meal packages, which is reviewed and updated every three months. All meals served on-board Biman flights are Halal and in Business Class, à la carte menus are offered.

=== Frequent-flyer program ===
Biman Loyalty Club, the frequent flyer program of the airline.

Biman launched a frequent-flyer program, named Biman Loyalty Club, in November 2013. It offers rewards such as tiered benefits, mileage bonuses, extra baggage, lounge access and priority check-in at airports. As of July 2014, the frequent-flyer program had 8,000 members.

=== Ticketing ===
An agreement was signed with Amadeus in 2007 to upgrade Biman's ticketing system with an e-ticketing solution to comply with IATA rules, which set out a deadline of 31 December 2007 for all member airlines to switch over their ticketing systems. E-ticketing allowed Biman to reduce costs while eliminating the stress of lost tickets for passengers. In 2005, Biman had briefly stopped using the Amadeus ticketing system when the government suspended the operation of a local Amadeus subsidiary following a court order, after allegations of money laundering. The suspension, however, lasted only a month, and was lifted after the writ was appealed in the High Court. In 2013, Biman signed an agreement with German e-ticketing company Hahn Air, enabling Biman's tickets to be purchased from anywhere around the world.

=== Biman Cargo ===
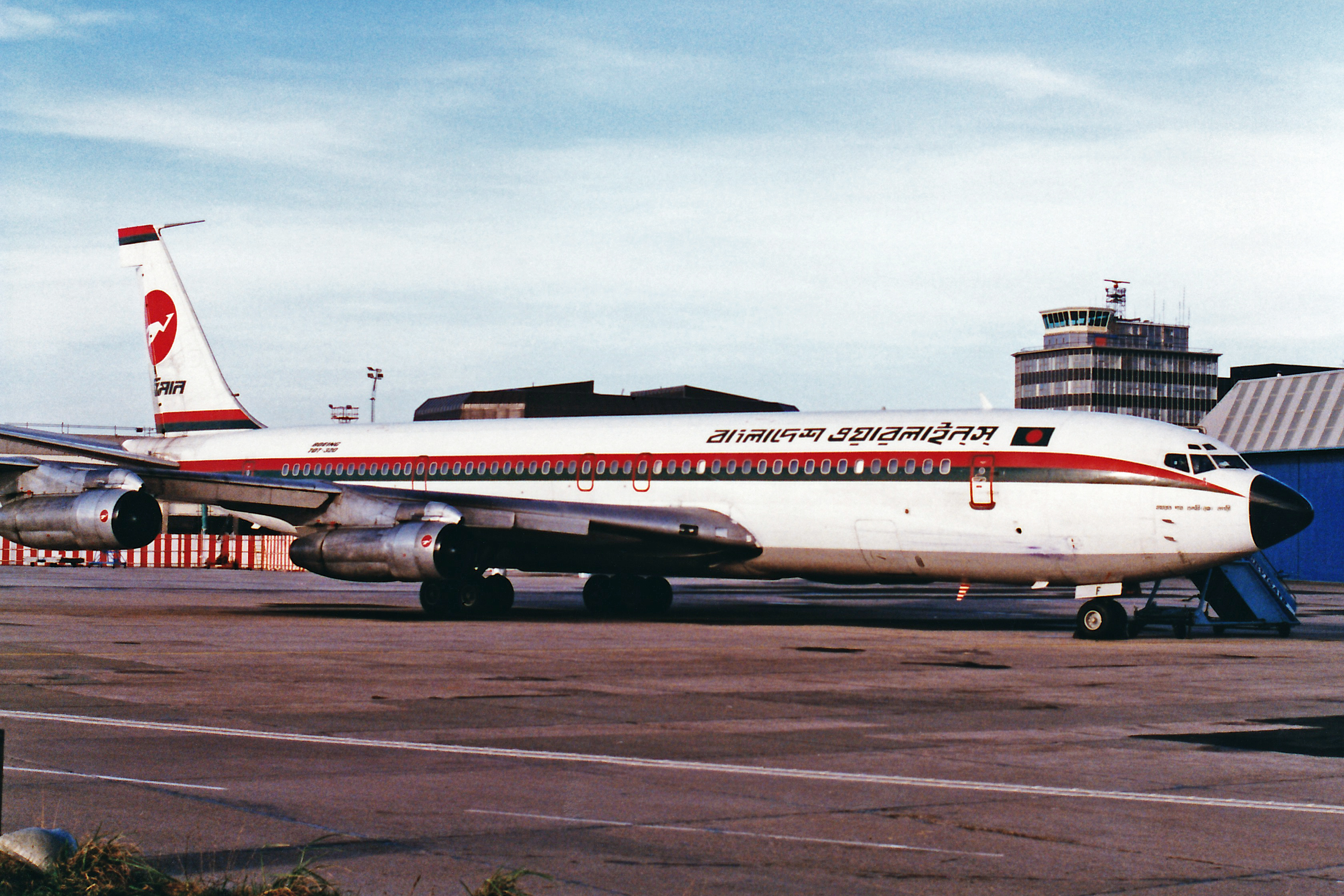
Biman Bangladesh Airlines Boeing 707 freighter at Manchester Airport

Biman also operates a cargo service using the cargo holds of its passenger aircraft to ship freight to international destinations. It has established a Cargo Village at Hazrat Shahjalal International Airport in Dhaka where the cargo is packaged and labelled before being loaded onto its aircraft for shipment overseas. The air cargo industry in Bangladesh grew by 16.5% in the fiscal year 2003–04. Private operators increased their share of the cargo market by 10.6% and were responsible for handling 24% of the total 99,000 tonnes of cargo at the expense of both Biman and foreign airlines which saw a reduction in their shares by 4.6% and 6.0% respectively. Foreign airlines handled 47% of the total cargo with Biman taking on the remaining 29% in the fiscal year 2003–04.

In March 2018, Biman Bangladesh Airlines received ACC3 and RA-3 (Regulatory Agent for third country) certifications from the European Union allowing direct cargo flights to all destinations in Europe. ACC3 stands for Air Cargo or Mail Carrier operating into Europe from a third-country airport. These certifications were successfully obtained after the government of Bangladesh upgraded Hazrat Shahjalal International Airport (HSIA) and improved its security, including setting up Explosive Detection Systems (EDS), Explosive Detection Dogs (EDD) and Explosive Trace Detection (EDT) machines. Due to the improved security standards, Biman Cargo Village and Dhaka Airport (HSIA) also got the ACC3 and RA-3 certifications simultaneously and an RA-3-compliant warehouse was built at HSIA for Europe-bound cargo freight where entry is restricted for everyone apart from accredited Biman staff.

=== Biman Bangladesh Mobile App ===
On 28 December 2019, Prime Minister Sheikh Hasina launched the Biman Bangladesh Airlines Mobile App. She also laid the foundation stone of the third terminal of Hazrat Shahjalal International Airport in Dhaka and inaugurated the Sonar Tari and Achin Pakhi, which are two new purchases of Boeing 787-9 Dreamliner aircraft to the flag carrier. The app was made available for passengers around the world.

== Destinations ==
As of September 2023 Biman serves 30 destinations with 48 routes. The airline operates flights to several destinations in the Middle East, some in South and South East Asia and London and Manchester in Europe. The carrier has air service agreements with 43 countries leaving room for further expansion in future.

=== Route map ===
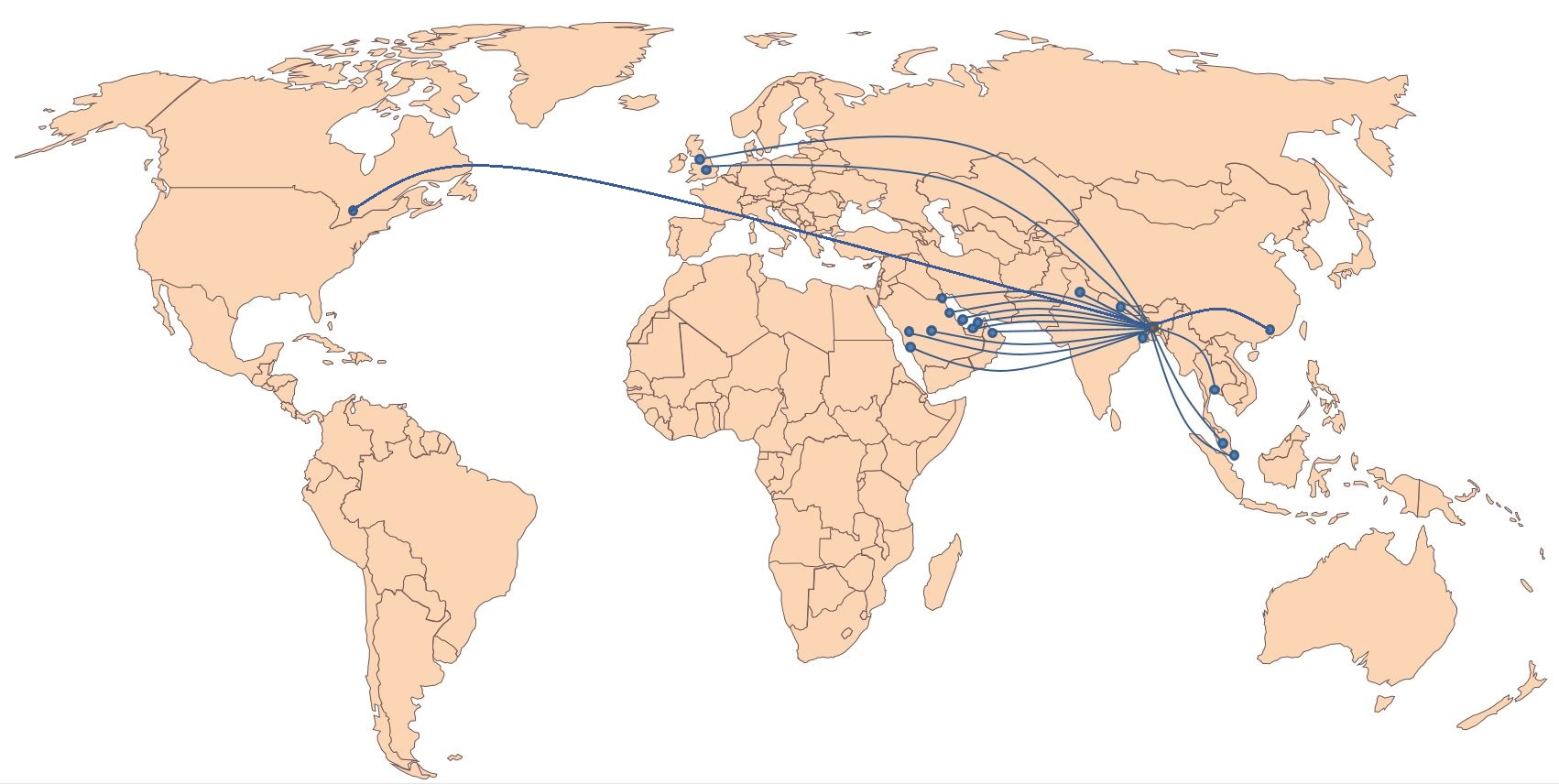
Biman flies internationally to: Abu Dhabi, Bangkok, Dammam, Delhi, Doha, Dubai, Guangzhou, Jeddah, Kathmandu, Kolkata, Kuala Lumpur, Kuwait, London, Manchester, Medina, Muscat, Toronto, Riyadh, Sharjah, Singapore and New York.

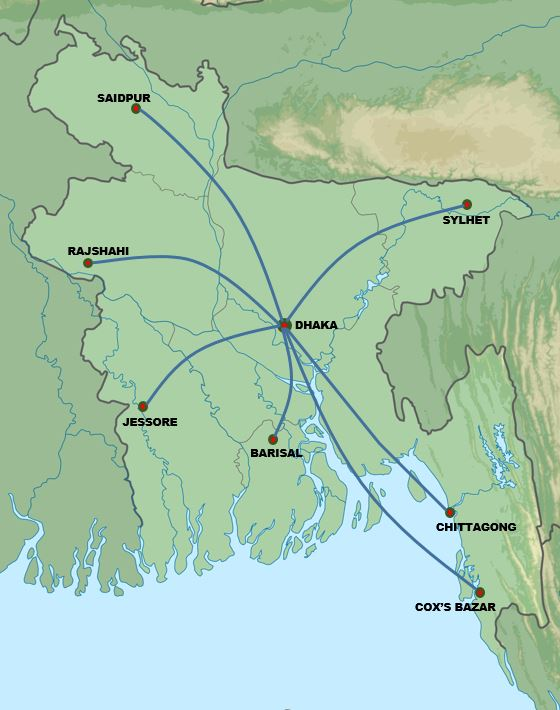
Biman currently serves 8 domestic destinations, including its main hub in Dhaka.

From 1993 to 2006, Biman operated flights to New York City from Dhaka, catering to the many Bangladeshis who lived and studied in the United States. New York was Biman's farthest and most prestigious destination, and was kept operational, despite heavy financial losses towards the end, to maintain a landing slot in the US which, if cancelled, could be difficult to regain.

=== New York City ===
In December 1993, the airline inaugurated service to New York City via Delhi, Dubai and Amsterdam using a McDonnell Douglas DC-10. It subsequently routed the flight from Dhaka to New York through Dubai and Brussels and the inbound one through Brussels. To curb the losses, Biman reduced the service to one flight per week and changed the European stop to Manchester Airport, UK, capitalising on travel demands from the expatriate Bangladeshi community in the north of England. On 8 April 2006, Biman's inaugural flight to Manchester landed at Manchester Airport en route to New York. However, the Federal Aviation Administration (FAA) had placed the Civil Aviation Authority of Bangladesh (CAAB) into Category 2 (does not meet International Civil Aviation Organization standards) according to its International Aviation Safety Assessment Program, which placed additional restrictions on the country's airlines when flying to the US. For Biman, this meant it could continue flying to the US, but could not expand or alter its routes. The FAA fined Biman for breaching its rules, and flights to New York began stopping in Brussels again.

The FAA already warned Biman to replace its ageing DC-10s by December 2005. According to experts, these aircraft were inadequately equipped to cross the Atlantic safely. On 13 May 2006, the FAA refused permission for the flight to enter its airspace, citing safety concerns over the DC-10. The pilots diverted to Montreal, Canada, where the passengers were provided with alternative airline options to complete their journey. Canadian authorities inspected the aircraft and gave it a clean bill of health after which the aircraft returned to Dhaka without any passengers. The FAA eventually admitted it was mistaken and apologised for the error. The incident put an end to the route, which had been losing US$80,000 per flight, owing to its use of obsolete DC-10s. Biman decided to axe the route along with several other regional and domestic routes to curb the huge losses being incurred by the airline each month.

In 2026, it was announced that Biman was aiming to complete a range of ICAO safety audits, with the aiming of earning an FAA Class-1 Category status. Bangladesh Civil Aviation Chairman stated that the New York route could not be opened before 2028.

=== London ===
On 4 March 1972, Biman started its first international operations with a weekly flight to London using a Boeing 707. As of January 2020, Biman Bangladesh Airlines flies directly to London Heathrow, from Hazrat Shahjalal International Airport in Dhaka, four times a week transporting both passengers and cargo, using its newly purchased Boeing 777 aircraft. Under its new management, the airline has seen a marked improvement in punctuality as well as in on-time flight performance in recent times. Back in 2007, Biman faced strong criticism from major international airports including London Heathrow Airport and Dubai International Airport for its failure to maintain flight schedules. Heathrow Airport operator BAA wrote to Biman providing evidence which showed Biman had not achieved the minimum 80% usage of its allocated landing slots at Heathrow, as required by EU and International Air Transport Association (IATA) regulations, during the summer of 2007. Biman should, therefore, not expect slot allocations at Heathrow for the summer of 2008 and should look to Stansted or Gatwick airports if it wished to continue serving London. Following discussions with BAA, however, Biman obtained landing slots for the summer of 2008 on condition that it achieved 80% usage. Delays continued unabated and in September 2008, Biman's Dhaka–London direct flight utilising a DC-10 aircraft was diverted and landed at Gatwick when it did not have sufficient fuel to remain in a holding pattern over Heathrow following arrival over three hours after the scheduled time. In 2008, the United Nations advised its staff not to fly with Biman, citing both safety and security concerns and Biman's unreliable flight schedules. It was made clear that UN staff who flew with Biman did so at their own risk, and would be ineligible to make claims on insurance. Biman's then-newly appointed managing director said he was unaware of the UN directive, but admitted that Biman did face problems in managing its flight schedules. He expected the situation to improve with the procurement of aircraft in the coming months.

=== Toronto ===
In July 2020, Biman announced the introduction of a new route to Toronto which will be flown thrice-weekly beginning in October 2020. The route comes as part of an air agreement between Bangladesh and Canada, and will allow passengers to connect onward to cities across North America with its Air Canada hub at Toronto's Pearson Airport. On 26 March 2022, on the occasion of 51st Independence Day of Bangladesh and to observe the birth centenary of Sheikh Mujibur Rahman, Biman operated a special flight, BG-305, from Dhaka and Toronto–Pearson. In April 2022, initially the inaugural commercial flight was scheduled on 11 June 2022, however, Biman decided not to operate a direct flight to Toronto as it would not be commercially viable, rather planned to operate the flight with a stopover in any of the European or Asian destinations for refueling and extra passengers. On 22 April, Biman confirmed that it would use Manchester Airport as a stopover for its Toronto flight, to make it more commercially viable. However, later in May, Biman decided that Istanbul Airport will be used for refueling purposes, making it a technical halt only, not being allowed to aboard or deboard passengers from the airport. On 27 July, the first flight left Dhaka at 03:30 with 160 passengers only.

=== Hajj flights ===
The annual Islamic pilgrimage to Mecca for the Hajj is undertaken by thousands of Bangladesh's predominantly Muslim population. Biman has been the sole Bangladeshi airline permitted by the government to provide flights for pilgrims to King Abdulaziz International Airport, Jeddah. Every year, the commencement of these flights is inaugurated by high-ranking government officials, including, at times, the Prime Minister. In 2002, the government opened the service to private tour operators for the first time. The initial private flights were plagued with delays, with both outgoing and return flights postponed for as long as nine days. Biman's handling of Hajj flights has also been beset with troubles. In 2005, the State Minister for Civil Aviation and Tourism resigned after complaints that he set fares too high. In 2006, Biman took the unprecedented step of removing the business–class seats from its dedicated Hajj flights to accommodate more economy-class passengers. Procedural irregularities by the Hajj agencies delayed the confirmation of pilgrims' visas, and Biman had to cancel 19 flights owing to lack of sufficient passengers. Once the situation was resolved, Biman was then unable to offer the required number of flights to cope with the backlog of passengers.

In June 2007, the caretaker government approved a three-year Hajj policy aiming to alleviate the problems encountered during the previous two years. Hajj flights would also begin leaving from Bangladesh's two other international airports, Shah Amanat International Airport and Osmani International Airport. Biman put out a tender for the wet lease of two aircraft for additional Hajj flights and reached an agreement with Phuket Air. However, the deal fell through in August 2007 after Phuket Air demanded advance payment of 30% instead of the previously agreed-to 10%. Ausban Aeronautical Services of Australia was selected next, following a re-tender, to fill the gap left by Phuket Air. In 2008, Biman wet-leased a 542-seater Boeing 747-200 from Kabo Air of Nigeria for six months to operate flights to Saudi Arabia and the UAE. Another 512-seater Boeing 747-300 was leased from Orient Thai Airlines. As of June 2014, Biman still experienced difficulties in providing their scheduled services, as the carrier gave priority to the transportation of pilgrims to Jeddah during the Hajj season using aircraft that otherwise were flown on its regular flights. Despite this, the airline reported a profit of almost BDT 1 billion from the 2012 Hajj season, the highest results ever since these services were started in 1973.

=== Codeshare agreements ===
As of August 2023, Biman Bangladesh Airlines had codeshare agreements with the following airlines:

- Gulf Air

=== Interline agreements ===
- Air Canada
- APG Airlines
- Emirates
- Hahn Air
- Kuwait Airways
- My Freighter Airlines
- Pakistan International Airlines

== Fleet ==
=== Current fleet ===
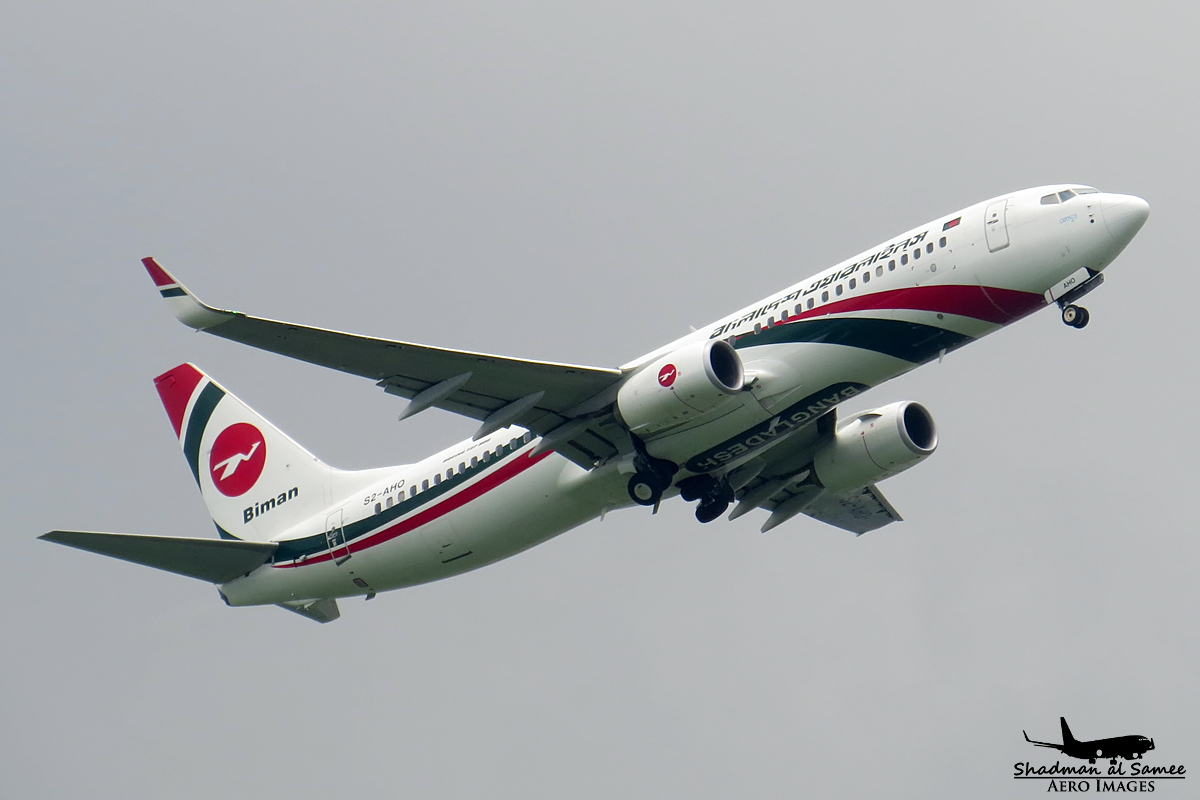
Boeing 737-800 of Biman.

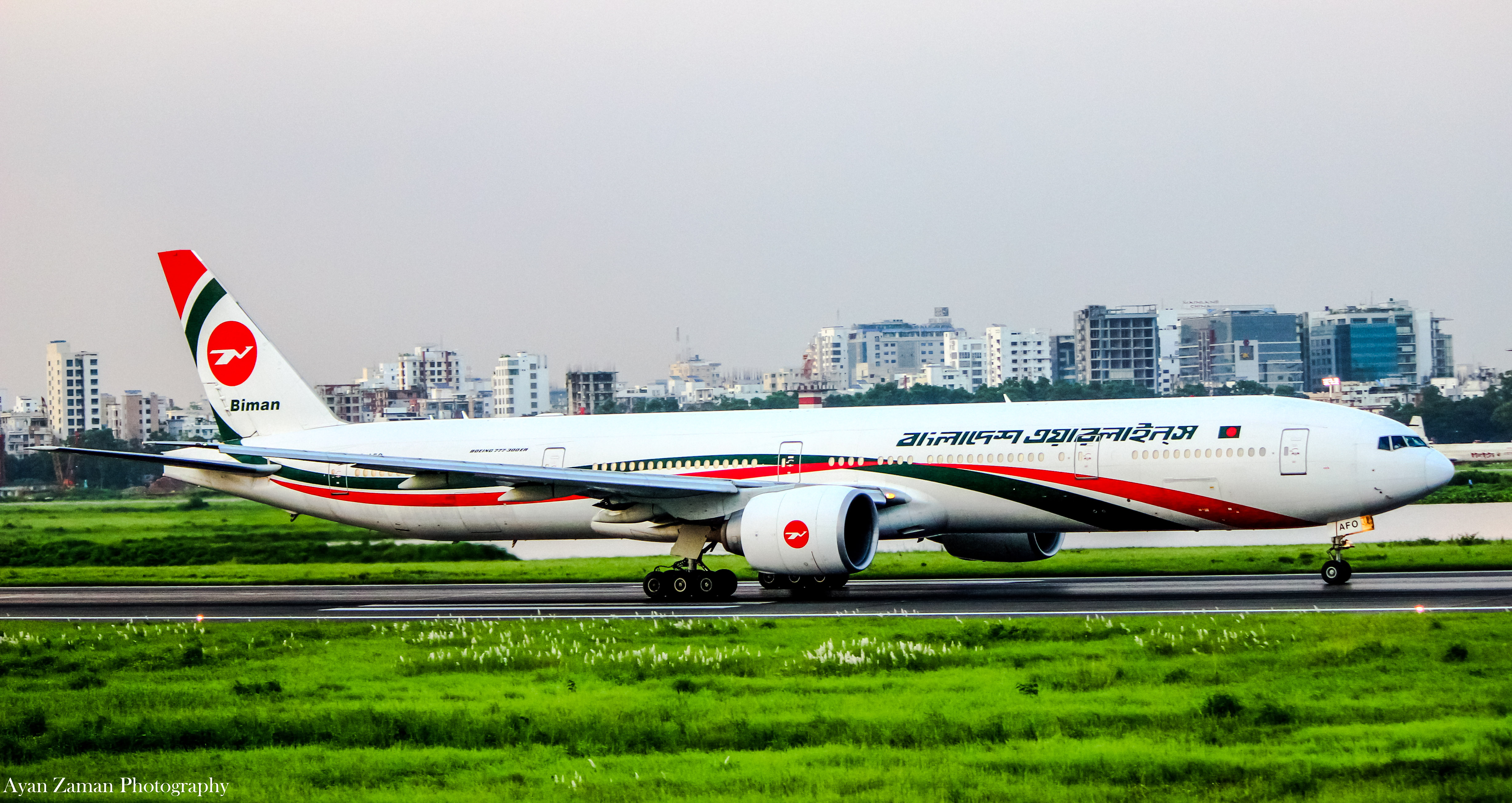
Biman Bangladesh Airlines Boeing 777-300ER departing Hazrat Shahjalal International Airport in Dhaka.

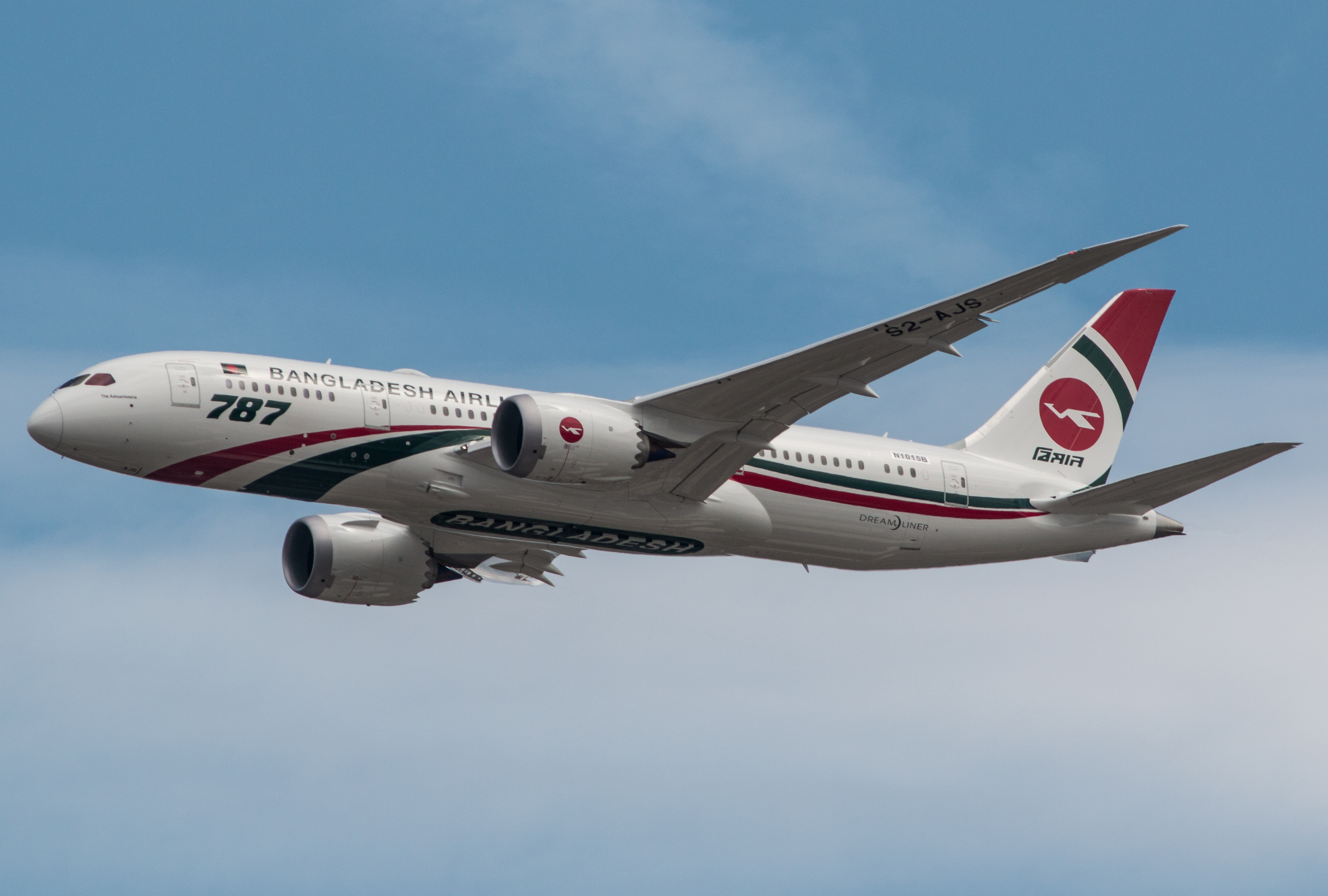
Biman Bangladesh Airlines Boeing 787-8 at Farnborough Airshow.

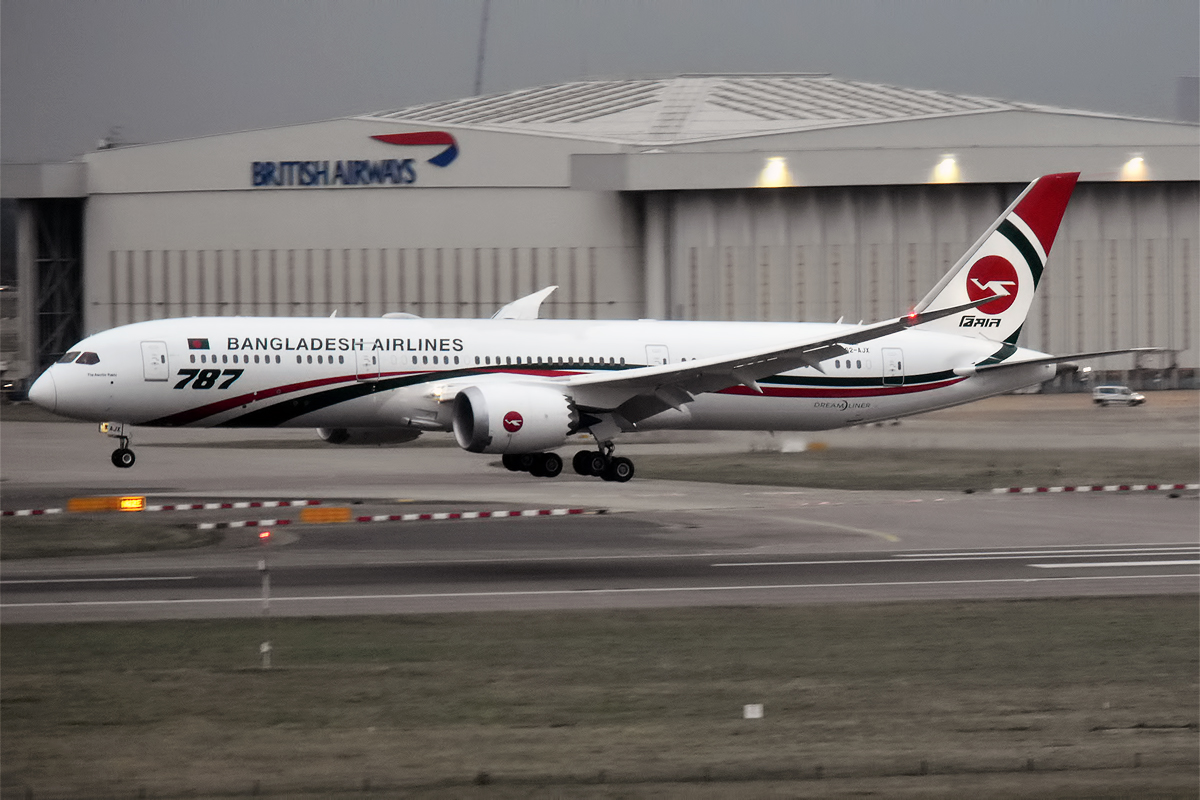
Biman Bangladesh Airlines Boeing 787-9 landing at London Heathrow in 2020.

As of April 2026, the Biman Bangladesh Airlines fleet includes the following aircraft:

Biman Bangladesh Airlines Fleet
| Aircraft | In service | Orders | Passengers | | | | Notes |
| Aircraft | In service | Orders | C | Y+ | Y | Total | Notes |
|---|---|---|---|---|---|---|---|
| Airbus A321neo | — | 6 | TBA | | | | |
| Airbus A350-900 | — | 4 | TBA | | | | |
| Boeing 737-800 | 4 | — | 12 | — | 150 | 162 | |
| Boeing 737 MAX 8 | — | 10 | TBA | | | | |
| Boeing 777-300ER | 4 | — | 35 | — | 384 | 419 | |
| Boeing 787-8 | 4 | — | 24 | — | 247 | 271 | |
| Boeing 787-9 | 2 | 2 | 30 | 21 | 247 | 298 | |
| Boeing 787-10 | — | 13 | TBA | | | | |
| De Havilland Canada Dash 8-400 | 5 | — | — | — | 74 | 74 | |
| Total | 19 | 35 | | | | | |

=== Fleet history ===
==== 1972–2000 ====
A vintage Douglas Dakota and Douglas DC-3 were the first aircraft in Biman's fleet. Domestic operations commenced with the acquisition of four Fokker F27 aircraft flying passengers to Chittagong and Sylhet from its base in Dhaka. Shortly afterwards, a Boeing 707, chartered from British Caledonian, joined the airline's fleet, allowing Biman to begin international flights. In 1983, Biman purchased three McDonnell Douglas DC-10-30 aircraft from Singapore Airlines to provide services on its long-haul routes. In a deal worth US$40,000,000 (equivalent to $103,892,617 in 2025), three British Aerospace ATPs were ordered in late 1989. These ATPs entered the fleet in late 1990, coming to replace the Fokker F27s.

During the mid-1990s, Biman switched its airliner of choice for long-haul routes to the Airbus series of aircraft. In 1995, two PW4000-powered Airbus A310-300s were ordered; the first of them joined the fleet on 15 June 1996. It nevertheless retained its elderly DC–10 fleet. For over three decades, the DC–10–30s were Biman's sole widebody aircraft and served the airline consistently well, with no noteworthy mechanical problems – in marked contrast to the record of its domestic operations. These were operated with Fokker F28 and BAe ATPs which were routinely out of service because of technical trouble. In one incident, a government minister disembarked a flight and travelled by road when he learned that the aircraft he was on was a BAe ATP. In January 2003, Biman leased two Boeing 737-300s which were used on domestic and regional routes for eighteen months.

McDonnell Douglas DC-10s and Airbus A310-300s made up most of Biman's international fleet, before the delivery of the modern Boeing 777-300ERs started in 2011. Fokker F28s made up the remainder of the fleet for the domestic and regional sectors, before they were retired in 2012 Biman's fleet contains the second-to-last Douglas DC–10 to come off the production line (l/n 445), and only three other Airbus A310–300s were produced following Biman's purchase of two new Airbus A310s in 1996. The two Fokker F28–4000s were acquired from PBair in 2004 at a cost of $2.91 million. Both of these aircraft were built in 1977, making Biman's latest acquisitions the oldest aircraft in its fleet. The ageing fleet made it difficult for Biman to maintain its flight schedule, as the aircraft suffered from mechanical problems, leading to flight delays and cancellations. A number of aircraft remained grounded owing to lack of spare parts as they are no longer manufactured and used parts are difficult to source. A deal was signed in January 2012 a three-year contract with a German company for the maintenance of their powerplants, for the DC–10s. The airline operates its own ancillary and maintenance facilities at Shahjalal International Airport, where it carries out all maintenance work and C-Checks on DC–10–30s and A310–300s.

==== 2000s ====
In 2000, Biman put out a request for proposal for the acquisition of four wide-bodied aircraft to replace the DC–10s, but both the fleet renewal plans and the airline's expected privatisation were shelved by the government. A further attempt was made in 2005 to acquire new aircraft and plans were submitted for the purchase of ten new wide-bodied Airbus and Boeing aircraft at a total cost of $1 billion. Boeing arranged to finance the purchase provided a guarantee was given by the Bangladesh government. After bureaucratic delays and a perceived lack of commitment from the government, Boeing lost interest and the plans were cancelled. A similar attempt to purchase medium-haul aircraft for domestic service was also postponed. In March 2007, Biman put out a tender for the dry lease of two Airbus A310-300 and two Airbus A300-600 aircraft for two years. The sole response to the tender came from Star Aviation of the United Arab Emirates (UAE).

After Biman became a public limited company, renewed attempts were made to procure new-generation aircraft to replace its ageing fleet. In November 2007, Boeing made an offer to supply Biman with four Boeing 777-200s (with options for two more) to be delivered by 2013 and four Boeing 787-8 Dreamliners (with options for two more) to be delivered by 2017 and provide similar aircraft on lease for the interim period beginning in 2009. The average price of these aircraft was quoted as US$165 million. Airbus also made an offer to supply four Airbus A320 or Airbus A330 series aircraft at a much lower price than that of Boeing. To manage the fleet in the short run, Biman again floated a tender in January 2008 to purchase or dry lease with options to purchase two used Airbus A310-300 aircraft.

On 10 March 2008, the Biman management unveiled a plan to procure eight next-generation wide-bodied aircraft from Boeing Commercial Airplanes for a total cost of US$1.26 billion, including four 419-seater Boeing 777-300ER (average price of US$182.9 million per unit), and four Boeing 787-8 Dreamliners that will seat 294 (US$133.31 million per unit), to be delivered in 2017. The deal for the acquisition of these eight aircraft was signed with Boeing in April 2008, and also included a memorandum of understanding for the purchase of two Boeing 737-800s to be delivered in 2015, with Biman making an initial instalment of US$1.54 million. Of the remaining cost, US-based EXIM bank will finance 85%, while a syndication of local banks will finance the balance. In June the same year, Biman placed a firm order for two Boeing 737-800s, and took options for two more aircraft of the type. The total order for these ten aircraft was valued at around US$2.5 billion.

==== 2010s ====
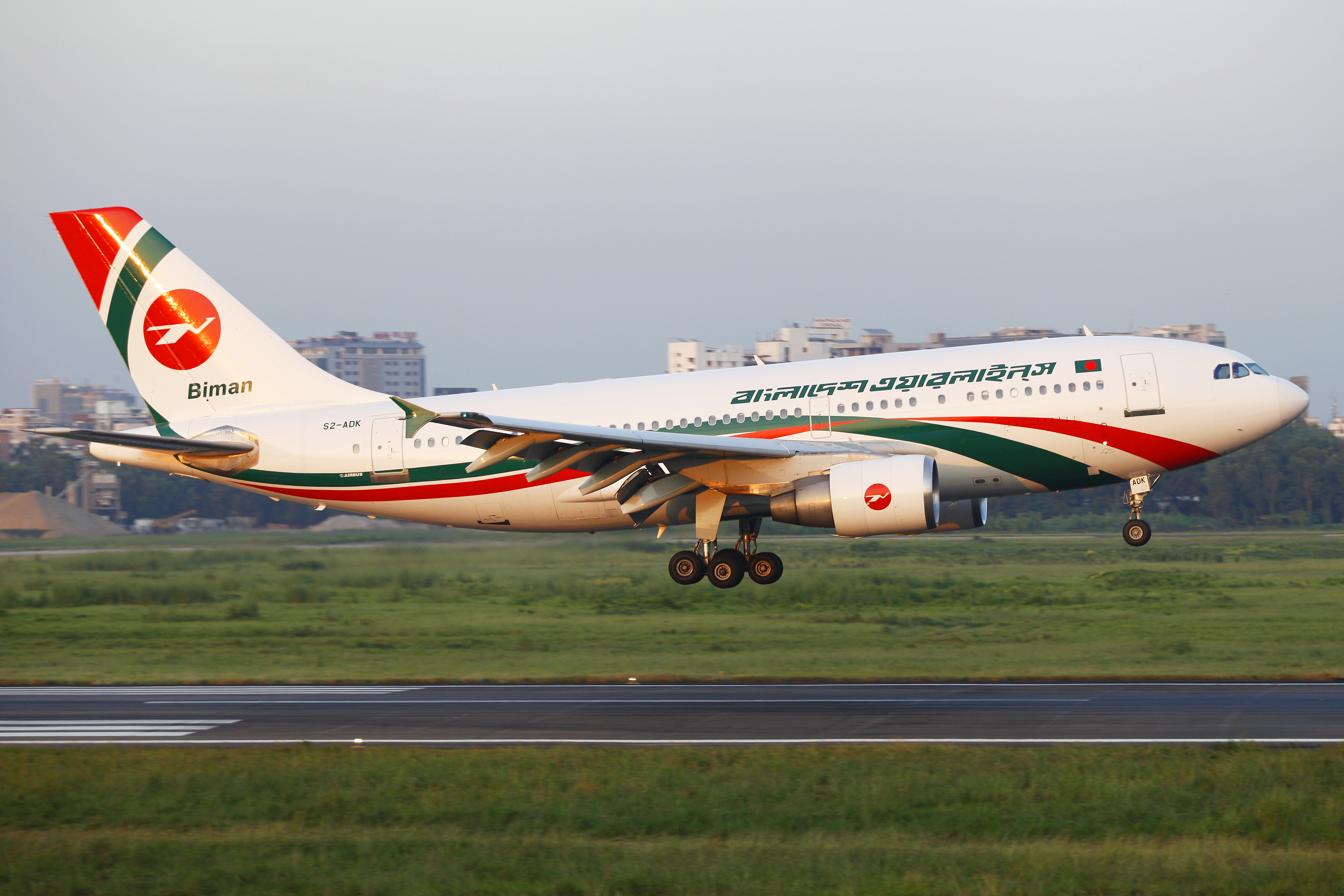
A Biman Bangladesh Airlines Airbus A310-300 landing at Shahjalal International Airport in 2012.

In 2010, Biman leased two Boeing 777-200ERs from EuroAtlantic Airways. These aircraft were used mainly on routes to European destinations to cover the interim period before the delivery of the first two new Boeing 777-300ERs in 2011. To secure the delivery of these two brand new 777-300ERs the airline used an initial US$277 million loan granted from JPMorgan Chase. Wearing a new livery, the carrier took delivery of its first Boeing 777-300ER in late October 2011. It was the 300th 777-300ER delivered by Boeing. The 301st ever delivered Boeing 777-300ER also went to Biman. The airline took possession of it in late November 2011. The third Boeing 777-300ER, named Aakash Pradeep, was handed over to the carrier in February 2014. The fourth one, named Raanga Pravat, joined the fleet in March 2014, following the government approving a US$356 million loan, of which US$290 million will be provided by the Ex-Im Bank and the rest by the Standard Chartered Bank.

Biman retired its entire McDonnell Douglas DC-10 fleet on 20 February 2014, by operating a special Dhaka-Birmingham farewell flight with its last DC-10 with a stopover at Kuwait. The carrier also operated nine separate aviation enthusiasts' scenic flights at Birmingham, from 22 to 24 February, flying three flights a day. The aircraft was then offered for sale as scrap in Dhaka. The Airbus A310-300s were withdrawn from service in October 2016.

The carrier leased two Boeing 777-200ER aircraft from EgyptAir in March 2014. The airline planned to expand its fleet to 16 aircraft, to allow route expansion. With newly leased Dash 8-Q400 aircraft, the carrier resumed domestic flights in full swing to Cox's Bazar, Jessore, Saidpur, Rajshahi and Barisal in April 2015. The two aircraft, dry leased from Smart Aviation Company for a period of five years, also operated on regional flights to Kolkata and Yangon. Initially it was supposed to resume in November 2013, which Biman failed to as it was unable to find a lessor of aircraft.

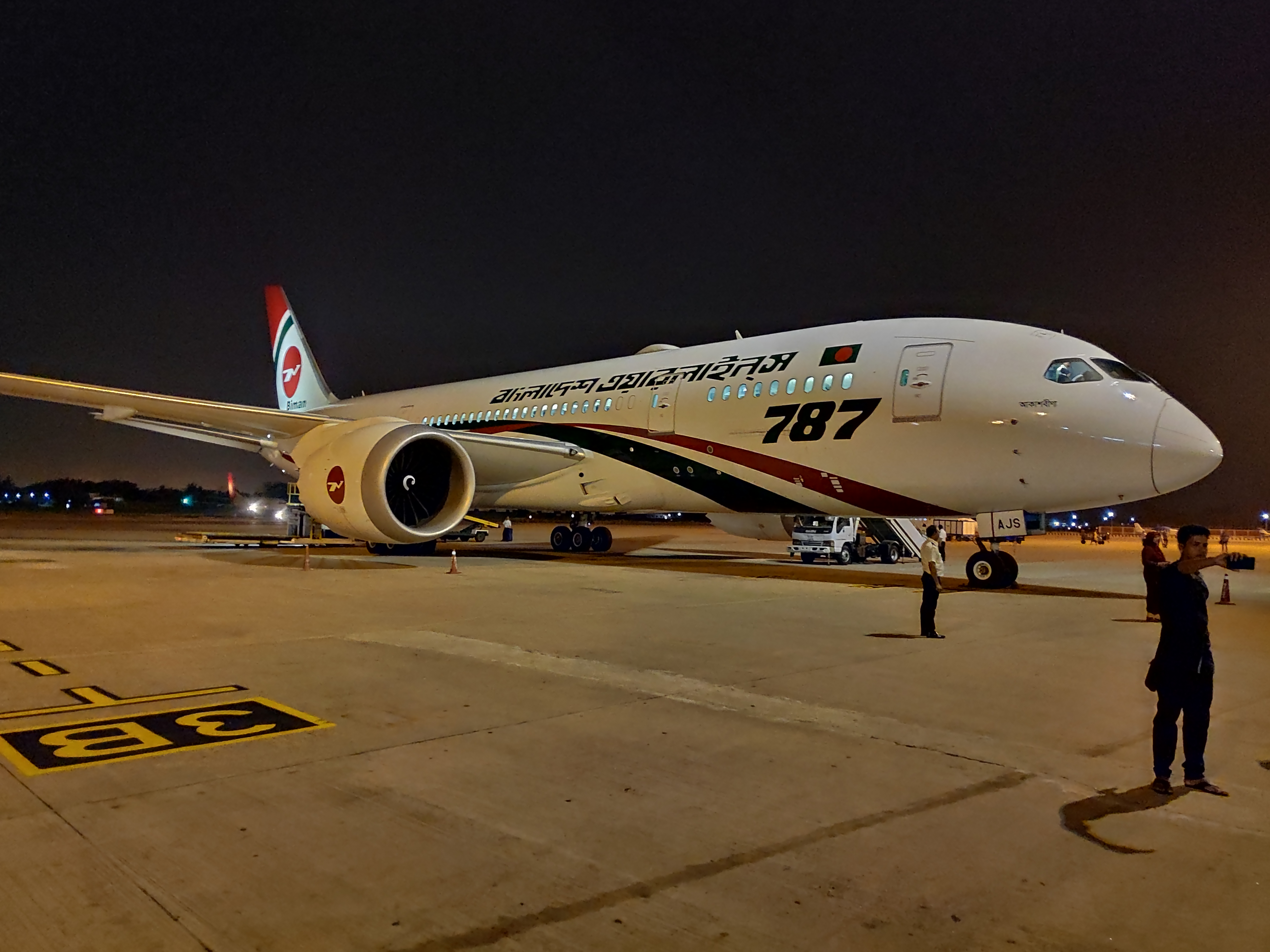
First Boeing 787-8 Dreamliner of Biman in Shah Amanat International Airport, Chittagong en route to Doha.

In February 2017, it was announced that the airline would acquire three of their own Dash 8-Q400 which will be used to replace the current aircraft leased from Smart Aviation Company to continue operating domestic and regional flights. Due to reliability issues with its Boeing 777-200ER aircraft leased from EgyptAir, Biman announced in December 2017 that the aircraft would be returned in March and May 2018, one year ahead of the expiration of the lease.

On 19 August 2018, Biman received its first of four Boeing 787-8 Dreamliners and it was named "Akash Beena" in Bengali by the Prime Minister of Bangladesh, Sheikh Hasina, who inaugurated it on 5 September 2018 during an inauguration ceremony before its maiden commercial flight. The Dreamliner has this name inscribed on its side, below the cockpit, written in English on the port side and in Bengali on starboard. On 1 December 2018, the second of four Boeing 787-8 Dreamliners was received, increasing the fleet of Biman to fifteen aircraft, and it was named "Hangsa Balaka" in Bengali with BG-2112 as its serial number. The last Boeing 787-8 named "Raj Hangsha" joined the fleet on 14 September 2019.

After receiving all four Boeing 787-8, Bangladesh Prime Minister Sheikh Hasina showed interest to buy two more Boeing 787-9. As China-based Hainan Airlines cancels its 30 Dreamliner orders, Boeing approaches Biman and the latter agrees to buy two 787-9 at a negotiated price of US$150 million for each aircraft. Both these aircraft joined the fleet on 21 and 24 December 2019 and these two aircraft are named as Sonar Tori and Awchin Pakhi.

==== 2020s ====
In January 2020, Biman expressed interest in buying two more Dash-8 Q400NG short-bodied aircraft. This proposal is made to increase the frequency of the flights on domestic and regional routes. Besides, discussion is going on for taking four more Boeing 787-9 that was not taken up by Hainan Airlines and later on passed by Vistara. Besides, the airlines intended to buy cargo aircraft in future.

All three Dash-8 Q400NG from the first batch of orders received by March 2021. Another two were ordered and will join the fleet by 2022. The number of Dash-8 aircraft will be six by 2022 (including one from lease). By adding Dash-8 Q400NG, Biman Bangladesh Airlines will stop using Boeing 737-800 planes on domestic routes. So Boeing 737-800 will operate on international routes only. Biman will also use Dash-8 aircraft on some short-range international routes.

In May 2026, Biman signed a deal with Boeing to purchase fourteen aircraft at an estimated value of 3.7 billion US Dollars. Of the fourteen aircraft, eight would be Boeing 787-10, two Boeing 787-9 and four Boeing 737-8 Max. As the deliveries are scheduled to start from 2031, State Minister Rashiduzzaman Millat announced that they intended to dry-lease 10 aircraft by 2027. Furthermore, In July 2026, Biman announced that it would dry-lease three Boeing Dreamliner 787-9 by early 2027.Later, in September 2026, they expanded their deal with Boeing to include five extra 787-10 Dreamliners and six more 737-8 MAX jets.

Millat also announced that they had agreed to buy ten Airbus jets, consisting of four Airbus A350-900s and six A321neos. Biman Bangladesh Airlines 7 October signed an agreement with Airbus to acquire 10 new aircraft as part of its major fleet expansion programme.

=== Livery ===
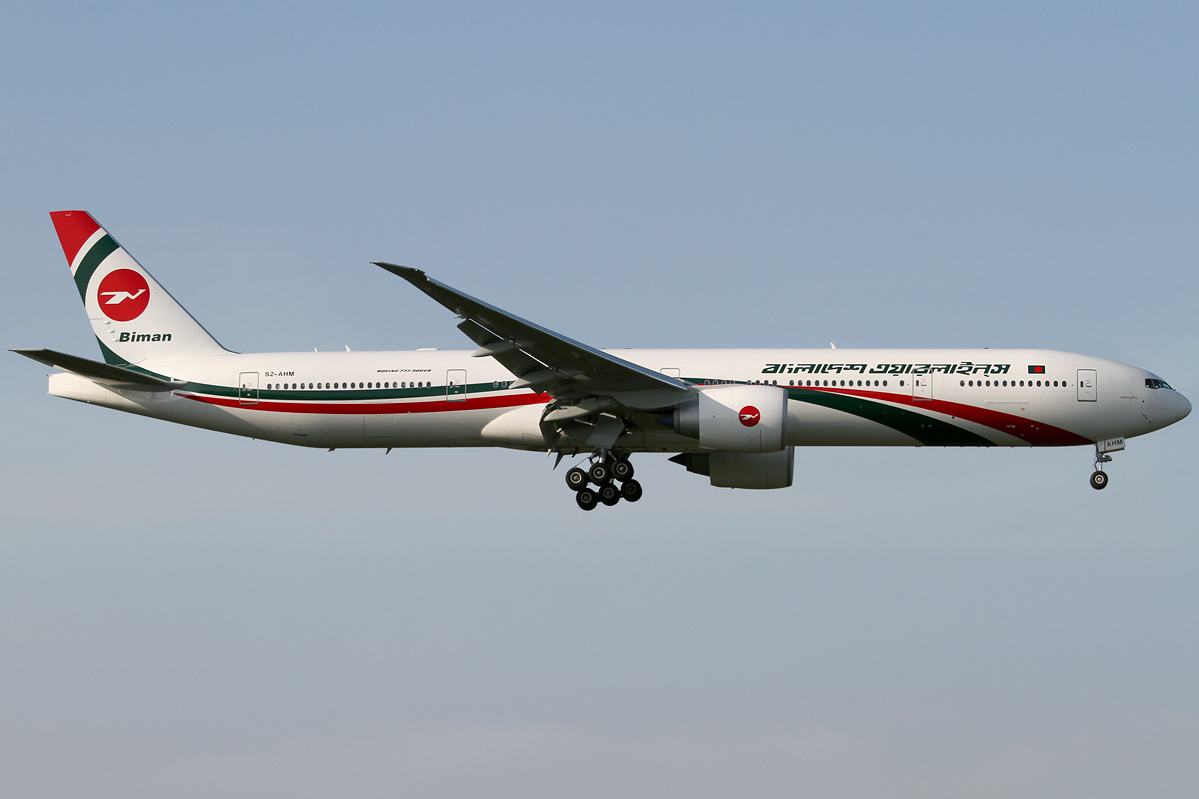
Boeing 777-300ER "Aakash Pradeep" wearing Biman's latest livery, 2014

In modern Bengali, the word বিমান Biman refers to "aeroplane", originating from the Sanskrit word vimāna, a name given to a flying machine mentioned in ancient Vedic literature. The logo, painted on the tail, is a stylised white stork (বলাকা bôlaka) inside a red circle. The logo was designed by painter Quamrul Hassan. The initial livery was a dark blue line extending across the aircraft along the windows and covering the tail section. This was replaced in the 1980s by dark green and red lines, matching the colours of the Bangladesh flag, and has remained so for over two decades.

A rebranding of Biman in 2010, scrapped after two months

In 2010, Biman went through a rebranding exercise and unveiled a new logo and livery, designed by Teague, which was applied to its leased Boeing 777 and 737 aircraft. However, following change of government, Biman reverted to the original branding as this livery was not deemed appealing or colour appropriate for Biman or reflecting Bengali culture. The carrier has since adopted a new, more modern and revised version of its livery, that was applied to the new Boeing 777-300ERs, Boeing 787-8 Dreamliners, and all other aircraft delivered or leased from 2011 onwards.

The bôlaka has also given its name to the Biman headquarters, the Balaka Bhaban (বলাকা ভবন bôlaka bhôban, Stork Building). A landmark sculpture, named Balaka and depicting storks, is also found in front of Biman's former headquarters, the Biman Bhaban, in the Motijheel Commercial Area of Dhaka. Eminent Bangladeshi sculptor; and mural, terracotta and landscaping artist, Mrinal Haque, designed and built this sculpture.

=== Retired fleet ===
Biman Bangladesh Airlines former fleet

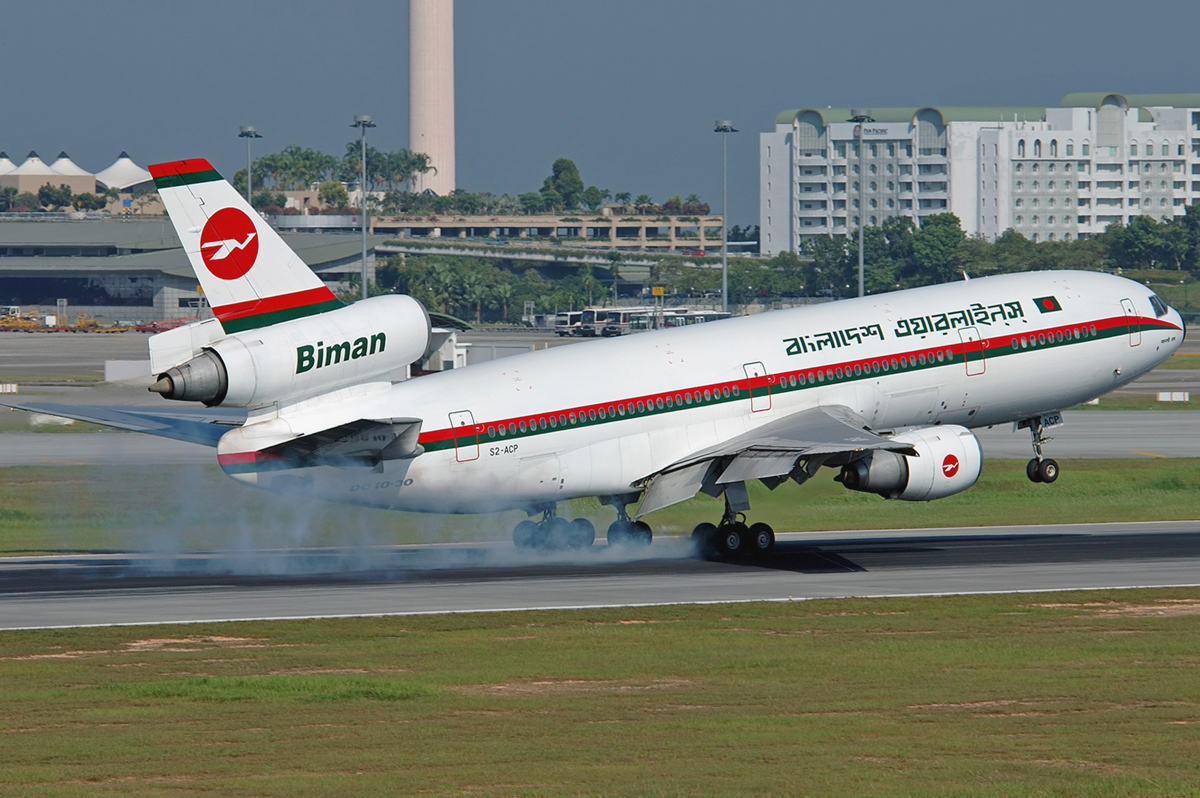
AMcDonnell Douglas DC-10-30, 2007

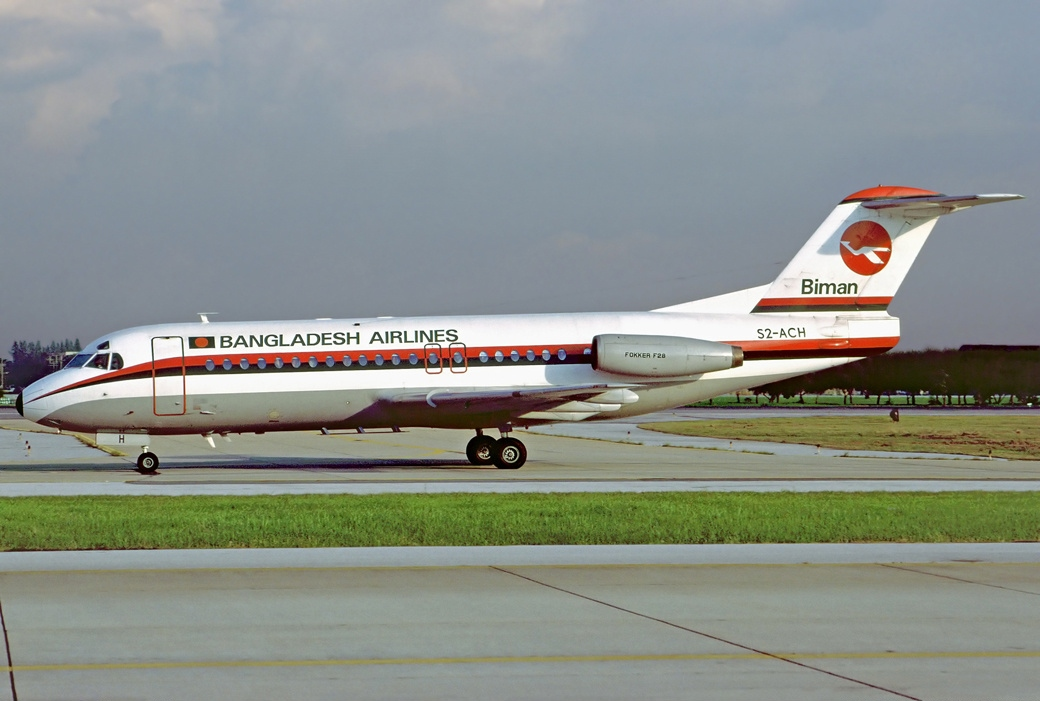
F28-4000 Fellowship, 1995. Biman received the first aircraft of this type in 1981.

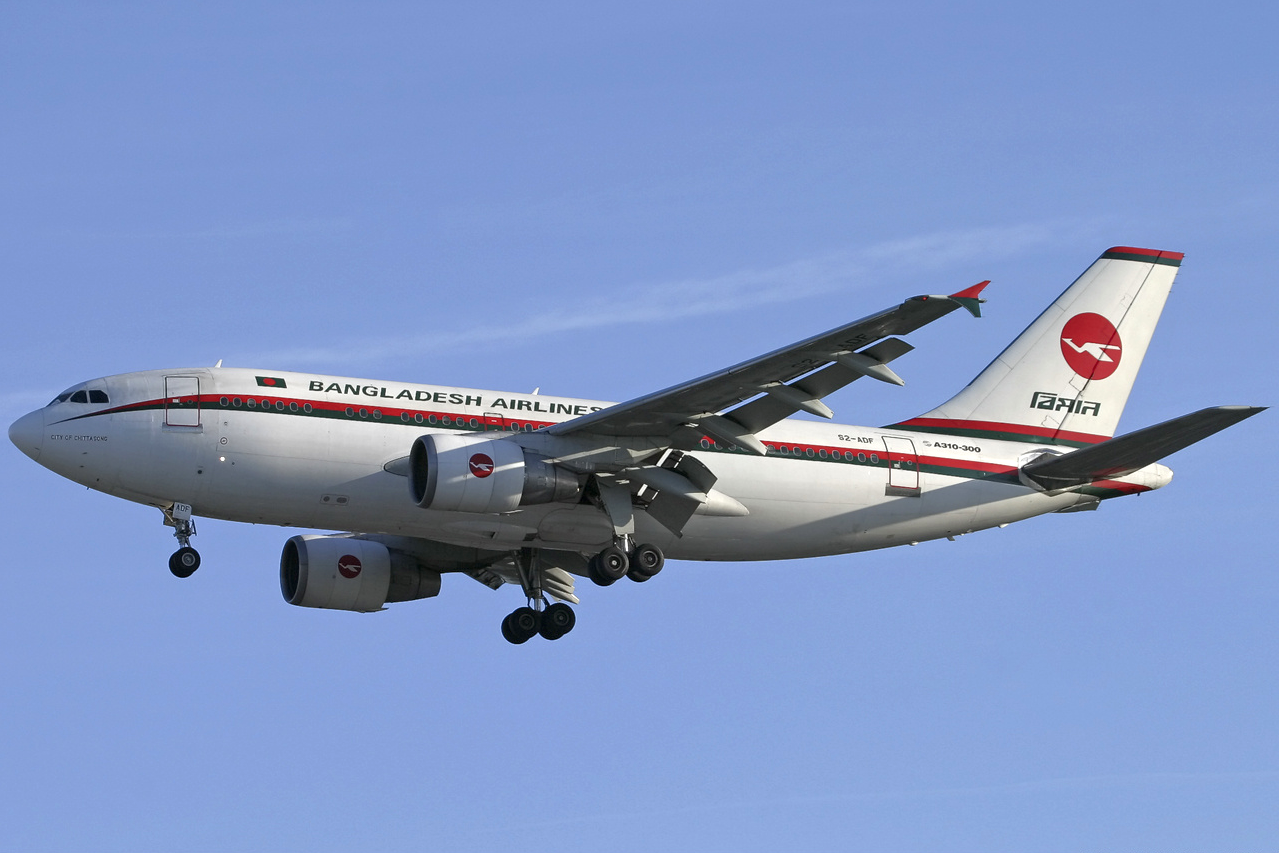
Airbus A310-300 in old livery, 2005

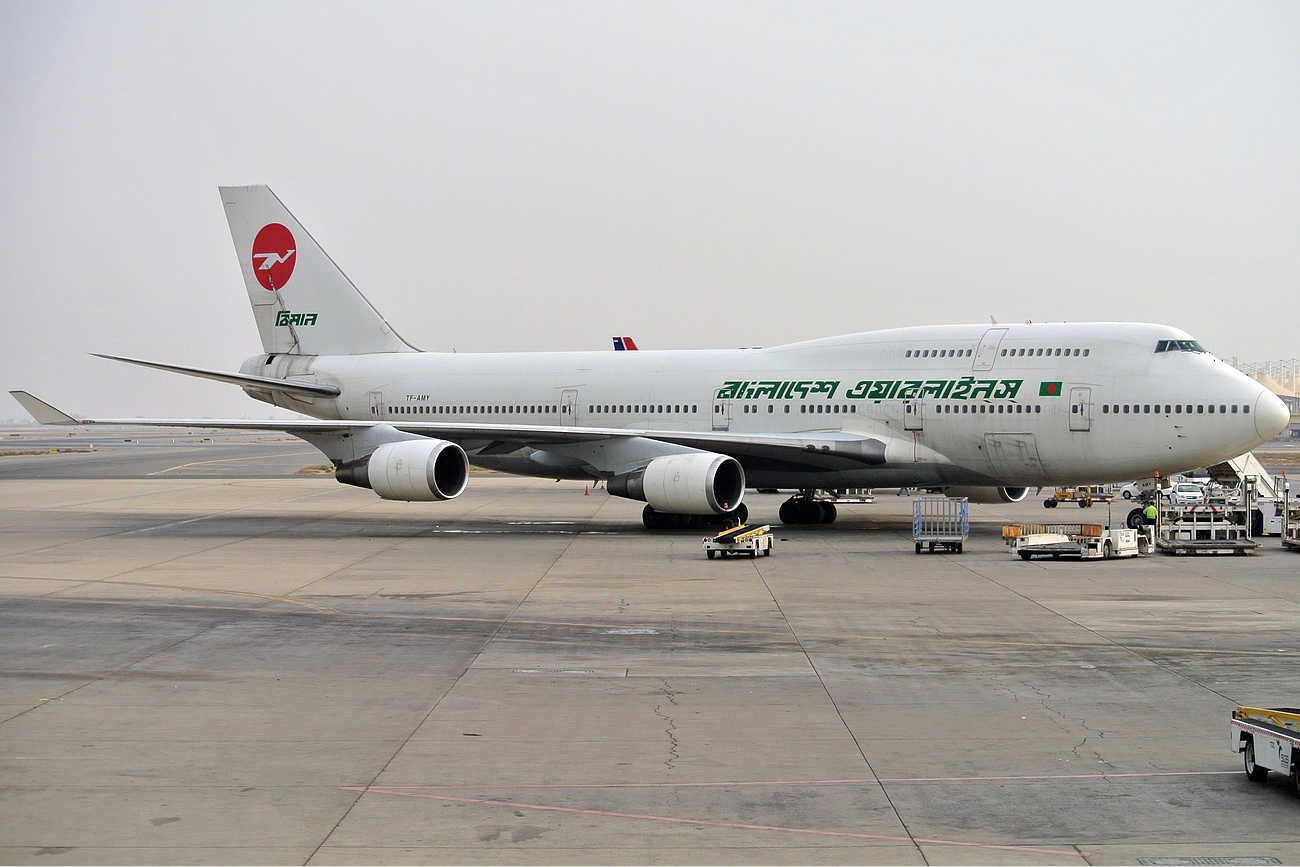
Boeing 747-400 in old livery, 2012

The carrier also formerly operated the following aircraft:

- Airbus A310-300
- BAe ATP
- Boeing 707-120B
- Boeing 707-320
- Boeing 707-320B
- Boeing 707-320C
- Boeing 737-300
- Boeing 747-200B
- Boeing 747-300
- Boeing 747-300SCD
- Boeing 747-400
- Boeing 777-200
- Boeing 777-200ER
- Douglas DC-6B
- Douglas DC-8-40
- Douglas DC-8-50
- Fokker F27-200
- Fokker F27-600
- Fokker F28-4000
- McDonnell Douglas DC-10-15
- McDonnell Douglas DC-10-30
- McDonnell Douglas DC-10-30ER
- McDonnell Douglas MD-80

== Accidents and incidents ==
As of July 2019, Aviation Safety Network records 12 accidents/incidents for Biman Bangladesh Airlines, with two of them leading to fatalities.

| Date | Location | Aircraft | Registration | Aircraft damage | Total on board | Casualties or fatalities | Description | Refs |
|---|---|---|---|---|---|---|---|---|
| 10 October 1972 | Dhaka | DC-3 | Unknown | W/O | 5 | 5 | Crashed near Dhaka during a training flight. | |
| 18 November 1979 | Savar Bazar | F27-200 | S2-ABG | W/O | 4 | 0 | Forced to land in a field near Savar Bazar following the flameout of both engines. | |
| 3 April 1980 | Singapore | Boeing 707-320C | S2-ABQ | W/O | 74 | 0 | Named "The City of Bayezed Bostami", the plane lost power following takeoff from Paya Lebar Airport, reached an altitude of about 100 feet (30 m) and sank back to earth with the landing gear retracted. The aircraft, due to operate an internationally scheduled Singapore–Dhaka passenger service, skidded for about 2,000 feet (610 m) before coming to rest. | |
| 5 August 1984 | Dhaka | F27-600 | S2-ABJ | W/O | 49 | 49 | Flight 426 on approach to Zia International Airport, inbound from Chittagong, fell some 500 metres (1,600 ft) short of the runway, after several missed approaches amid inclement weather. (Note: It was also stated that the aircraft crashed beyond the runway.) | |
| 22 December 1997 | Sylhet | F28-4000 | S2-ACJ | W/O | 89 | 0 | While on approach to Sylhet from Dhaka as Flight 609, the aircraft made a belly landing in heavy fog on some paddies 5.6 kilometres (3.5 mi) short of Sylhet Civil Airport. | |
| 8 October 2004 | Sylhet | F28-4000 | S2-ACH | W/O | 79 | 0 | Inbound from Dhaka as Flight 601, the aircraft made a long landing at Osmani International Airport in heavy rain and overshot the end of the runway by 150 feet (46 m), coming to rest in a 15 feet (4.6 m)-deep ditch. | |
| 1 July 2005 | Chittagong | DC-10-30ER | S2-ADN | W/O | 216 | 0 | The aircraft, which was operating an internationally scheduled Dubai–Chittagong–Dhaka passenger service as Flight 048, ran off the runway immediately after touchdown at Shah Amanat International Airport in inclement weather; following the collapse of the starboard main undercarriage, the right-side engine separated from the wing and caught fire as the aircraft sank into the mud. Some passengers received injuries while the aircraft was evacuated; there were no fatalities. An inquiry found no failures with the aircraft and placed the blame for the accident on the incompetence of the pilot, who was fired. | |
| 12 March 2007 | Dubai | A310-300 | S2-ADE | W/O | 236 | 0 | The nose gear collapsed on takeoff run at Dubai International Airport. The aircraft came to rest at the end of the airport's sole active runway, blocking it for more than eight hours. All 236 people aboard survived, a few with minor injuries. The plane was due to operate an internationally scheduled Dubai–Dhaka passenger service. | |
| 24 February 2019 | Chittagong | Boeing 737-800 | S2-AHV | N/A | 142 | 0 | Flight 147, operating a Dhaka-Chittagong-Dubai route, survived an attempted hijacking by a man with a toy pistol. All passengers were safely evacuated upon landing in Chittagong, and the would-be hijacker was shot dead by Bangladeshi special forces after he refused to surrender. | |
| 8 May 2019 | Yangon | Bombardier Dash 8 Q400 | S2-AGQ | N/A | 35 | 0 | Flight 060, operating the Dhaka-Yangon route, skidded off the runway due to heavy rain and strong crosswinds while landing at Yangon Airport in Myanmar during inclement weather. Eighteen people were slightly injured, including a pilot and an air hostess. | |

== See also ==
- Transport in Bangladesh
