= Aviation engineering =

Branch of engineering

Aviation engineering is a branch of engineering that deals with airspace development, airport design, aircraft navigation technologies, and aerodrome planning. It also involves the formulation of public policy, regulations, aviation laws pertaining to airspace, airlines, airports, aerodromes and the conduct of air services agreements through treaty.

This branch of engineering is distinct from aerospace engineering which deals with the development of aircraft and spacecraft.

== Airspace development ==
Global airspace is divided into territorial airspace which belongs to an individual country. Generally, airspace has to be engineered to benefit both military and civil users. Planning and designing airspace is important so as not to affect military operations and to designate air airspace for other aircraft to navigate freely without intervention by military authorities. For instance, not all of China can be used for commercial aeronautical navigation. Certain airspace is designated as military-use only. Navigating outside commercial airspace in China may lead to a risk civilian aircraft.

In prior years, airspace has been limited to military and airmail services. The advancement in aerospace engineering brought to fore aircraft designs that lead to the development of commercial airliners. Governments around the world concluded air rights for their respective airlines and their corresponding aircraft. The government saw the economic potential of airspace as a state enterprise. This rise in the development of commercial aviation led to the study of the complexities of aircraft (plane) management, airport design and construction, international air services agreements (treaties).

In recent years, the global airline industry has demanded that China should reform its aviation policies.

== Airport design ==
Recent designs of airports have been engineered to align with global environmental standards. Advancement in civil engineering and architecture make an interplay of the two disciplines.

== Career ==
Governments around the world hire aviation engineers for all sorts of reasons. In the United States, federal, state and local agencies all commonly employ aviation engineers for agencies such as the Department of Transportation. The Federal Aviation Administration, which is in charge of controlling aircraft navigation throughout the whole nation, maintaining navigation, licensing and certification for aviation engineers. FAA employs many aviation engineers to work on research and development problems, noise pollution and hypersonic aircraft among other things.

Engineers are heavily involved in improving aviation technologies to support the advancement of military and commercial aviation. Aviation engineers are often employed in aerospace machine shops specializing in the technological advancement of aircraft parts and equipment. These shops produce aircraft components such as electrical connectors, oxygen generation systems, landing gear assemblies, and other pieces that require special attention.

Aviation engineers do more than work on planes. Aviation engineers also play a large role in airport design. They provide guidance for the construction and daily running of the airports, as well as help in the operation and maintenance.
