= Maherin Chowdhury =

Bangladeshi teacher (1978/1979 – 2025)

- মাহেরিন চৌধুরী
- Born: 1978 or 1979; Jaldhaka, Nilphamari, Rangpur Division, Bangladesh
- Died: 22 July 2025 (aged 46–47); Dhaka, Bangladesh
- Cause of death: Extensive burn injuries
- Occupation: Teacher
- Employer: Milestone School
- Known for: Her efforts to save the children from the fire in the 2025 Dhaka Chengdu J-7 crash
- Relatives: Ziaur Rahman (uncle); Khaleda Zia (aunt); Tarique Rahman (cousin)
- Family: Zia family
- Awards: Independence Award (2026)

Maherin Chowdhury (Bengali: মাহেরিন চৌধুরী; 1978/1979 – 21 July 2025) was a Bangladeshi schoolteacher who died in the 2025 Dhaka Chengdu J-7 crash. She is best remembered for her efforts of saving at least 20 children from burning, while engulfed in flames.

== Early life and career ==
Chowdhury was born in Jaldhaka, now part of Rangpur Division in Bangladesh. She was a member of the Zia family and niece of former Bangladeshi president Ziaur Rahman. Her grandmother and Ziaur Rahman's mother were siblings. She worked as an English teacher and the coordinator of the Bengali medium of the classes III to V of the Milestone College since 2003.

== Jet crash and death ==
On 21 July 2025 at 13:18 BST (UTC+6), while she was at the school and classes were in session, an F-7BGI fighter jet of the Bangladesh Air Force crashed into the Milestone College's Haider Hall canteen. Chowdhury, though her body and clothes had caught fire, went back into a burning classroom repeatedly to rescue the students. She helped at least 20 children to get out from the building. While helping, 80-100% of her body got burned. She was admitted to the National Institute of Burn and Plastic Surgery, where she died of her injuries on the same day at around 19:30 BST. During the treatment, when asked by her husband, Mansur Helal, about her efforts, she replied, "they are also my children, they are burning. How can I leave them?"

She was buried at her hometown, Jaldhaka, Nilphamari, beside her parents' grave.

== Recognition ==
Chowdhury's efforts received global recognition. Malaysian Prime Minister Anwar Ibrahim praised her efforts and called for her "bravery and sacrifice" to be remembered.

The government gave Chowdhury, along with another teacher who died in the incident, a state honour. The Ministry of Education decided to give a national award annually in honour of her, named the "Maherin Chowdhury Award for Extraordinary Services", recognising teachers who perform works of bravery. In 2026, she was posthumously awarded the Independence Award, the highest civilian honour of Bangladesh.
