= 2025 Dhaka Chengdu J-7 crash =

2025 aviation accident in Bangladesh

Milestone tragedy
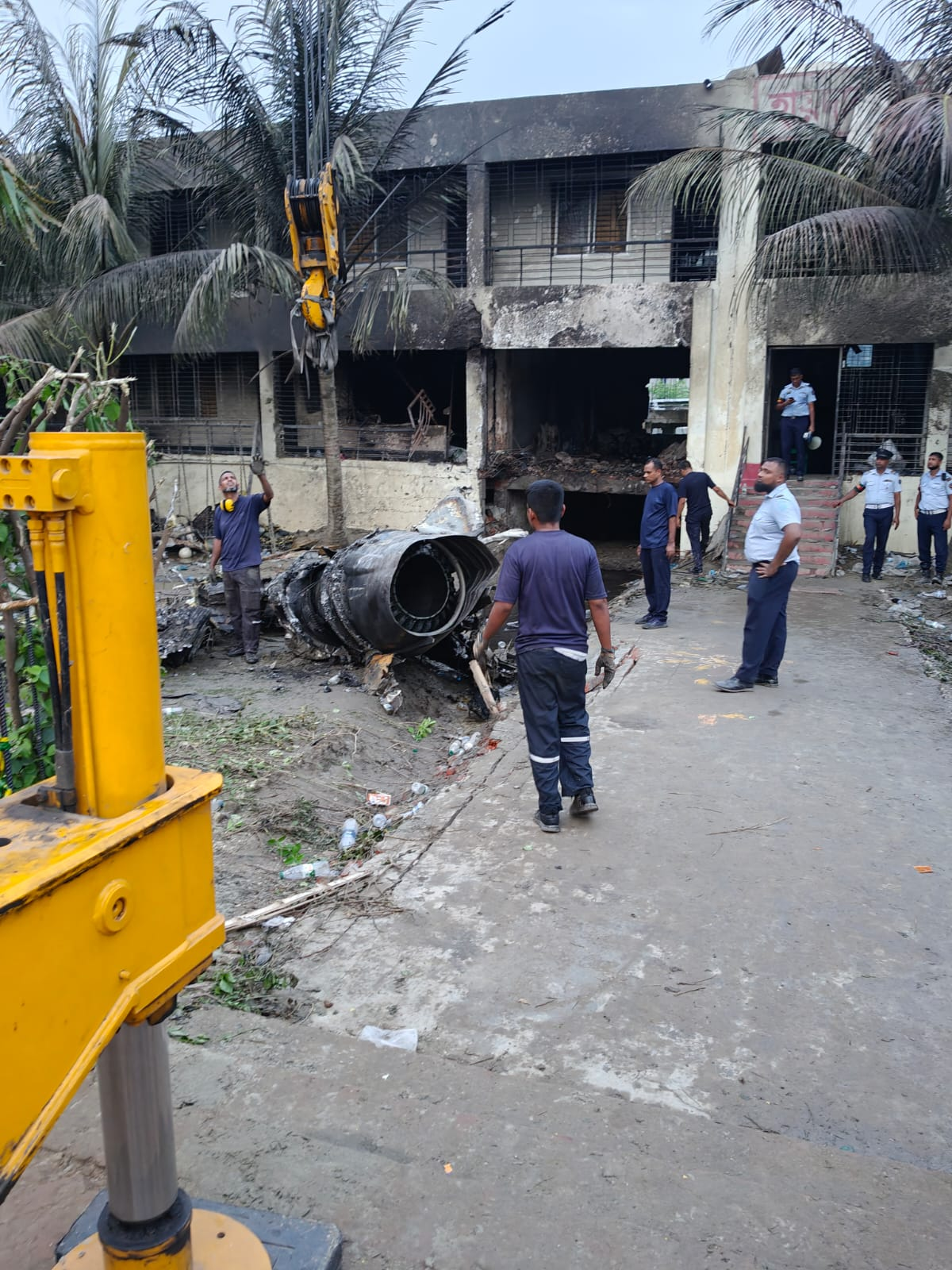
- A piece of aircraft wreckage at Milestone School

Accident
- Date: 21 July 2025; 14 months ago
- Summary: Crashed shortly after takeoff due to pilot error and loss of control
- Site: Milestone School campus in Uttara, Dhaka, Bangladesh; 23°52′39″N 90°22′05″E
- Total fatalities: 37
- Total injuries: 173

Aircraft
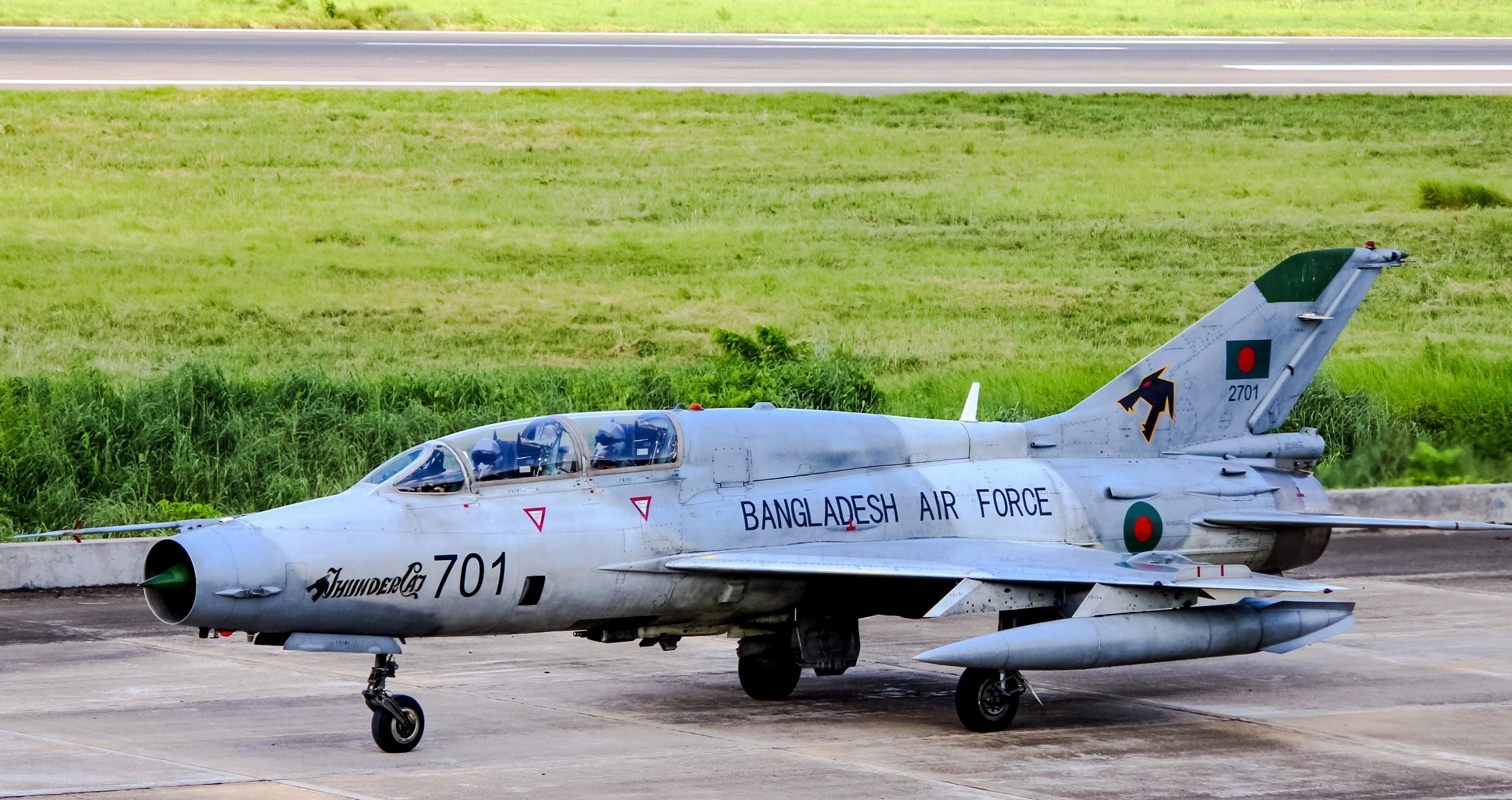
- 2701, the aircraft involved in the accident, seen in 2019
- Aircraft type: Chengdu FT-7BGI
- Operator: Bangladesh Air Force
- Call sign: THUNDERCAT 701
- Registration: 2701
- Flight origin: BAF Base Bir Uttom A. K. Khandker
- Occupants: 1
- Crew: 1
- Fatalities: 1
- Survivors: 0

Ground casualties
- Ground fatalities: 36
- Ground injuries: 173

On 21 July 2025, a Chengdu J-7 aircraft operated by the Bangladesh Air Force (BAF) crashed shortly after takeoff into the Milestone School campus in the Uttara neighbourhood of Dhaka, Bangladesh, while classes were in session. Investigations found that the cause of the crash was pilot error, resulting in a loss of control of the aircraft. At least 37 people were killed in the crash, including the pilot and 28 students, and 173 others were injured. It is also commonly referred to as the Milestone tragedy.

The crash triggered widespread protests by students demanding accountability, transparency over the casualty figures, and decommissioning of outdated aircraft. Demonstrations spread across the country, during which clashes with security forces led to the removal of the Education Secretary from office. Governments and organizations worldwide expressed condolences over the incident.

== Background ==
=== Aircraft ===
The Chengdu FT-7BGI is a 2013 trainer variant of the Chengdu J-7 Airguard, specially manufactured by the Chengdu Aircraft Corporation for the Bangladesh Air Force.

It was the sixth crash of an F-7 jet in the country since an initial incident in 1998 in Dhaka that killed the pilot.

=== Pilot ===
Towkir Islam Sagar (Bengali: তৌকির ইসলাম সাগর, romanized: Tôukir Islām Sāgôr) was born on 9 November 1997 in Sapura, Rajshahi. He married a lecturer at BRAC University a year before his death.

Sagar studied at Govt. Laboratory High School, Rajshahi until seventh grade, then completed high school at Pabna Cadet College in 2016. He was enlisted in the Bangladesh Air Force Academy on 22 December 2016 and was commissioned as flying officer in the pilot branch on 1 December 2019.

Sagar undertook the basic flying training course with No. 11 squadron and a basic jet and fighter conversion course at the No. 15 squadron. He reportedly logged over 100 hours of flight time on PT-6 trainer aircraft and another 60 hours on F-7BGI fighter aircraft. Sagar also completed several advanced courses including an operational training in aerospace medicine course in India. He was promoted to flight lieutenant in 2024 and joined the No. 35 squadron at BAF Base Bir Uttom A. K. Khandker.

== Accident ==
Location of the crash site

The jet took off at 13:06 BST from BAF Base Bir Uttom A. K. Khandker. Sagar was on his first solo flight. The aircraft malfunctioned shortly after takeoff; the aircraft became unresponsive and stalled, and he was unable to control the plane. The control tower instructed him to eject, but due to the low altitude, ejection was not a feasible option. According to the public relations department of the Bangladesh Armed Forces, Inter-Services Public Relations, he attempted to steer the aircraft toward a sparsely inhabited zone. Communication with the control tower was lost shortly after this. Moments later, the aircraft crashed into the Milestone College building. The crash occurred at 13:12 BST (UTC+6). Sagar reportedly had ejected just seconds before the crash. He was found alive and was airlifted to the coronary care unit of Combined Military Hospital in Dhaka, where he died from his injuries.

Closed-circuit television footage of the crash

Video footage of the jet was captured on CCTV. It crashed into the main gate of Milestone College's Haider Ali Building, entering the building on the ground floor through one side and exiting through the other.

The incident occurred just before a school break, while classes were still in session. The aircraft struck the roof of the school's seven-storey Block 7 before directly hitting the Haider Ali Building, which at the time contained over 100 primary and secondary students. The impact created a hole at the building's gate, causing a fire. Eyewitnesses heard a loud sound and saw smoke and plumes of ashes rising from the crash site.

== Emergency response ==
The Bangladesh Fire Service & Civil Defence reported that its crews arrived at the crash site at 13:22 BST. Nine fire service units and six ambulances were deployed to the scene, while two platoons of the Border Guard Bangladesh were deployed to secure the area and assist in rescue operations. A Dhaka Metro coach was used to transport victims to hospitals. A dedicated emergency hotline was established for victims of the disaster. Authorities collected bags, shoes, and identity cards of children from the crash site.

== Casualties ==
At least 37 people were killed, including 28 students, three teachers, three parents, one staff member, and the pilot. At least 173 people were undergoing treatment, many with burns, mostly aged below 12, with at least 25 of them in critical condition. At least 60 victims were hospitalized at the National Institute of Burn and Plastic Surgery, while 28 were taken for treatment at the Combined Military Hospital, Dhaka. Fourteen Bangladesh Army soldiers, a police officer, and a firefighter were injured whilst participating in the rescue operations.

Maherin Chowdhury, a teacher who rescued more than 20 students from the school, died from severe burn injuries in the hospital. She repeatedly ran into the building to rescue students from a burning classroom.

Milestone College established a seven-member committee to determine the actual number of casualties among its students, personnel, and guardians. Khadija Akhter, the head teacher of Milestone's school section, said that the committee received information about five missing and unaccounted people so far from family sources, namely three students and two guardians. DNA testing was performed on six unidentified bodies. After the test, five of the bodies were identified.

== Aftermath ==
A day of mourning was declared nationwide by Bangladesh's government for 22 July, with Bangladeshi flags to be set at half-mast. Following a government directive, special prayers for the victims were held in mosques nationwide on 25 July.

The Ministry of Education postponed the Higher Secondary Certificate (HSC) examination scheduled for 22 and 24 July nationwide, and later rescheduled it to 17 and 19 August.

Chief Adviser Muhammad Yunus, head of Bangladesh’s interim government, announced that a section of the Uttara-12 City Corporation graveyard would be reserved for the burial of the victims as a memorial to the incident. The Ministry of Education decided to give an annual award in honour of Maherin Chowdhury to recognise teachers who perform works of bravery.

== Investigation ==
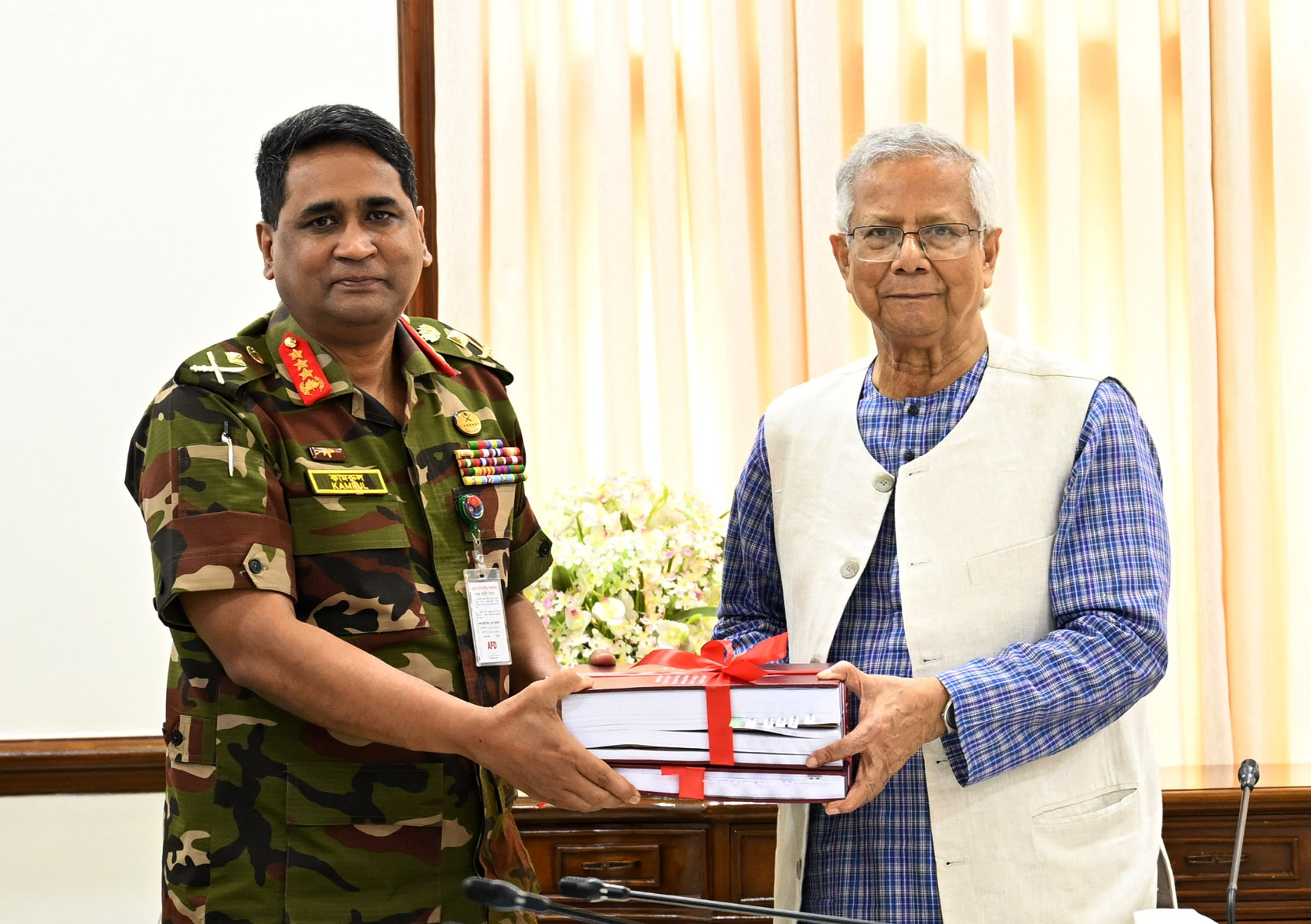
Investigation committee's report being submitted to Chief Advisor Yunus, head of Bangladesh's interim government

The Inter-Services Public Relations (ISPR) issued a statement that the Bangladesh Air Force (BAF) had formed a high-level committee to investigate the incident. The ISPR attributed the accident to a mechanical fault and said that the pilot had "made every effort to divert the aircraft away from densely populated areas towards a more sparsely inhabited location". On July 22, BAF chief marshal Hasan Mahmood Khan also attributed the crash to a technical failure and denied that they were concealing the true death toll, adding that the BAF would provide assistance to the injured until their full recovery.

The High Court asked the government to establish a technical investigative committee. On 5 November 2025, the official investigation committee submitted their report to Chief Adviser Muhammad Yunus. The report blamed pilot error for the crash.

The probe committee interviewed around 150 individuals, including experts, eyewitnesses, and victims' families, and collected 168 pieces of evidence. Based on its findings, it made 33 recommendations to the government.

As per the CA's press secretary Shafiqul Alam:

"The probe body concluded that the tragedy resulted from a pilot's operational error during flight, which caused a loss of control over the aircraft. Among its key recommendations, the committee proposed that, for public safety, all initial Air Force training be conducted outside Dhaka. The situation went beyond his control."

The report also revealed that the school building had not been approved in accordance with the Bangladesh National Building Code. Instead of the required three central staircases, the building had only one. The investigation indicated that this design flaw contributed to the high number of casualties.

== Reactions ==
=== Domestic ===
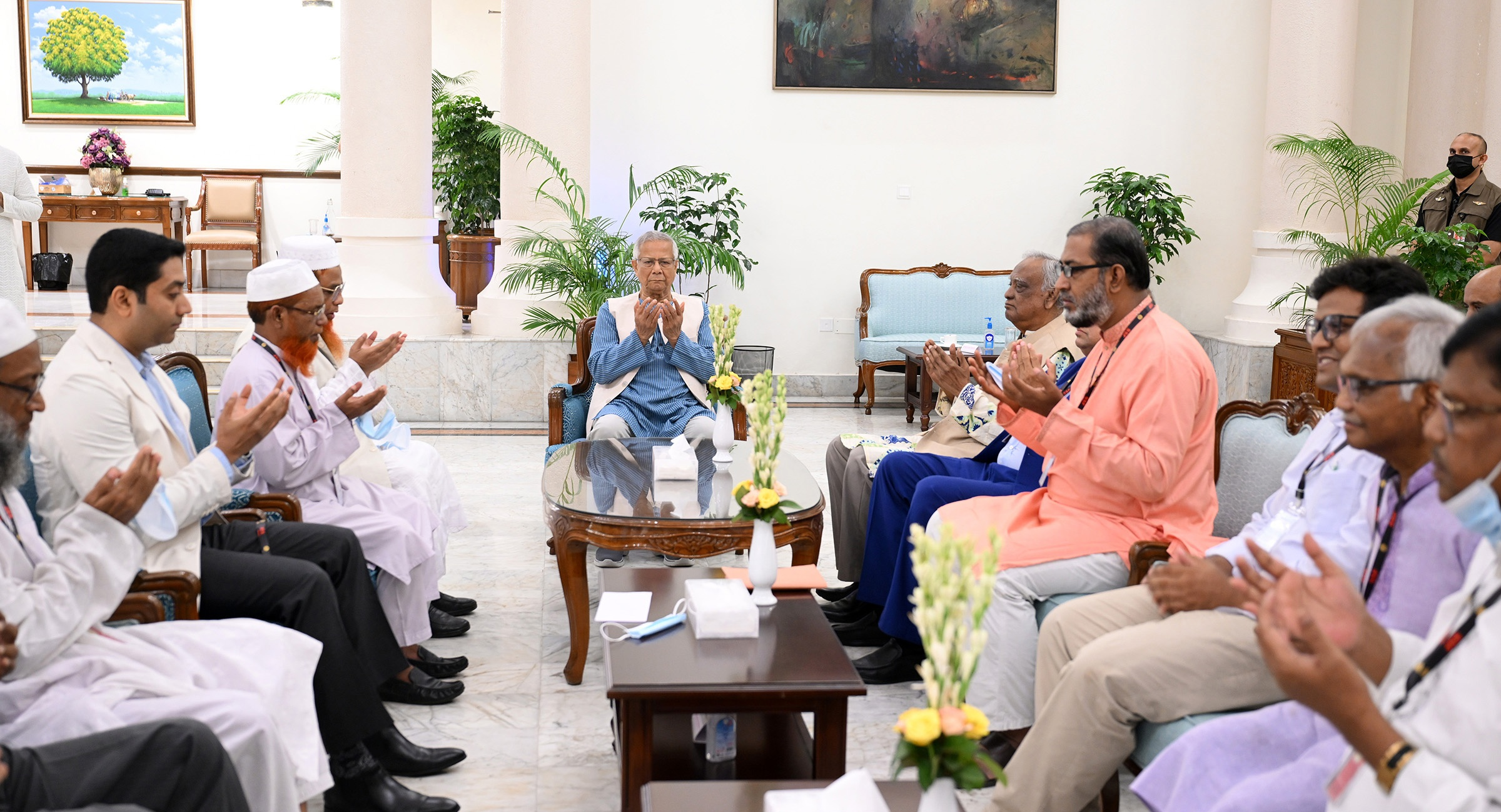
Chief Advisor Yunus and government officials praying for the fighter jet crash victims, 26 July 2025

In a video statement via Facebook, Chief Adviser Muhammad Yunus expressed his condolences and promised to hold an investigation into the crash. The interim government also announced that two teachers who died in the crash would receive state honours.

Several government advisers and party leaders, including Mirza Fakhrul Islam Alamgir, the general secretary of the Bangladesh Nationalist Party (BNP), visited the National Institute of Burn and Plastic Surgery and expressed their condolences. The National Citizen Party (NCP) postponed its scheduled rallies on 22 July, and its senior leaders left for Dhaka in response to the crash.

Bangladeshi cricketers Shakib Al Hasan and Tamim Iqbal, along with Pakistani cricketer Shaheen Afridi and many other sportsmen, expressed their strong concern about the disaster. Many cultural and online personalities expressed sorrow over the incident.

=== International ===
Foreign ministries, world leaders, and the embassies of Azerbaijan, China, India, Japan, Kuwait, the Maldives, Pakistan, Russia, Switzerland, Turkey, the United Arab Emirates, the United States, United Kingdom, the Vatican City the European Union, and the United Nations expressed shock over the crash and sympathy for the victims.

The governments of China, India, and Singapore sent specialized medical assistance teams in the treatment of burn patients at the request of the Bangladeshi government.

== Controversies ==
=== Training operations over Dhaka ===
Aviation experts and pilots have strongly criticized the conduct of military training flights over densely populated Dhaka. Aviation analyst Kazi Wahidul Alam noted that such operations pose significant risks, especially near Hazrat Shahjalal International Airport, which serves both military and commercial flights. On 7 August, the Civil Aviation Authority of Bangladesh said that no buildings in the crash area were of an illegal height; the maximum height was 135 ft (41 m), below the maximum approved height of 150 ft (46 m).

Criticism was also raised at the presence of the cantonment in central Dhaka, as well as the presence of structures in high-risk aviation zones attributed to poor urban planning and lax enforcement of zoning regulations. However, Air Marshal Chief Hasan Mahmood Khan stated that it was essential to national security to have "a strong air base" in Dhaka, and urged the public to not "weaken this pillar [the Bangladesh Air Force] with rumours".

=== Usage of FT-7BGI aircraft ===
Criticism was also levelled at the use of F-7 aircraft by the BAF despite a history of crashes involving the model, with investigative journalist Zulkarnain Saer Khan citing "economic necessity, established infrastructure, and slow procurement of modern aircraft" being the reason for their continued use by the BAF.

=== Allegations of irregularities and protests ===
The day after, on 22 July, students of Milestone College organized a protest at the campus in response to the crash and to allegations that access to the crash remained restricted twelve hours after the incident. The students demanded an accurate list of casualties, an apology for an alleged assault on teachers by personnel at the crash site, compensation from the BAF to the families of the deceased students, decommissioning of outdated aircraft in favour of newer models, and a reorganization of the BAF's training procedures and training zones. The students also alleged that the actual number of deaths was being withheld, which Chief Advisor Yunus denied. As of 24 July, access to the school was limited to teachers and staff members, and people searching for missing relatives who could provide proper identification. Milestone College reopened on 3 August for a mourning service, with the building hit by the jet sealed off. Classes at the school resumed on 6 August.

Law adviser Asif Nazrul and education adviser Chowdhury Rafiqul Abrar arrived at the campus on 22 July to speak with the students and called the demands logical. In response to the allegations of assault, Nazrul stated, "The government regrets the incident and will notify the army authorities to take appropriate action." Due to protests, the officials were stranded inside the campus for six hours and were only able to leave through a back exit with the help of law enforcement. However, they were forced to return after their motorcade ran into a blockade. They were eventually able to leave in the evening.

Students also staged demonstrations in front of the Secretariat and vandalized it, demanding accountability from the interim government over its handling of the crash and related fallout. Among the key demands was the resignation of Abrar and Education Secretary Siddique Zobair, citing their failure to ensure transparency, protect student rights, and respond effectively to the crisis. Later that day, the government announced Zobair's removal from office. The protests culminated in clashes with security forces and vandalism in vehicles that left 80 students, army personnel, and policemen injured. Similar protests were also held at regional education board offices in Chittagong, Sylhet, Comilla, Jessore, and Dinajpur.

On 12 August, relatives of the victims formed a human chain at Milestone College as part of a protest demanding a proper investigation into the disaster, the relocation of educational institutions from runways and moving air force training to uninhabited areas, and an end to coaching businesses in educational institutions, among others. The protesters also accused school officials of pressuring and threatening them to stay silent.

== See also ==
- List of accidents and incidents involving military aircraft
- List of aircraft accidents and incidents by number of ground fatalities
- Similar accidents and incidents:
  - Freckleton air disaster (1944), where a Consolidated B-24H Liberator bomber crashed into a school building in England, killing 61 people
  - 1946 Apeldoorn Fairey Firefly crash, also a first solo flight of a pilot crashing his fighter into a school building in the Netherlands, killing 23 people
  - 1990 Italian Air Force MB-326 crash, where a military jet crashed into a school building in Italy, killing 12 people
  - Air India Flight 171 (2025), where a Boeing 787-8 Dreamliner crashed into several buildings of a medical college in India, killing 241 on board and 19 on the ground
