= Siddique Zobair =

Bangladeshi politician and civil servant

Siddique Zobair is a Bangladeshi civil servant and former secretary of the Ministry of Education. He is a former member of the Sustainable and Renewable Energy Development Authority.

== Early life ==
Zobair did his master"s in petroleum management at the University of Alberta.

== Career ==
In 1996, Zobair worked on the National Energy Policy. He worked on the Bangladesh Energy Regulatory Commission Act, 2003.

In 2015, Zobair was joint secretary of the Power Division and convener of the technical negotiation committee of 200MW solar park in Teknaf project.

Zobair retired from government service on 1 January 2020 as an additional secretary. He was a member of the Sustainable and Renewable Energy Development Authority under the Ministry of Power, Energy and Mineral Resources.

Following the fall of the Sheikh Hasina led Awami League government, Zobair was appointed secretary of the Ministry of Education in October 2024 replacing Sheikh Abdur Rashid. Under Zobair, at least 30 out of 47 Vice-Chancellors, along with 18 Pro-Vice-Chancellors and treasurers from 40 appointments, were given those with affiliations with teacher organisations associated with the Bangladesh Nationalist Party and Bangladesh Jamaat-e-Islami. He is a member of the Bangladesh Institute of Governance and Management. He is a member of the governing body of the National Defence College. He is a trustee board member of the Bangladesh Institute of Development Studies.

He was removed from the post after student protests following the Air Force jet crash at Dhaka's Milestone School and College.
