= 1990 Italian Air Force MB-326 crash =

Air accident in Italy

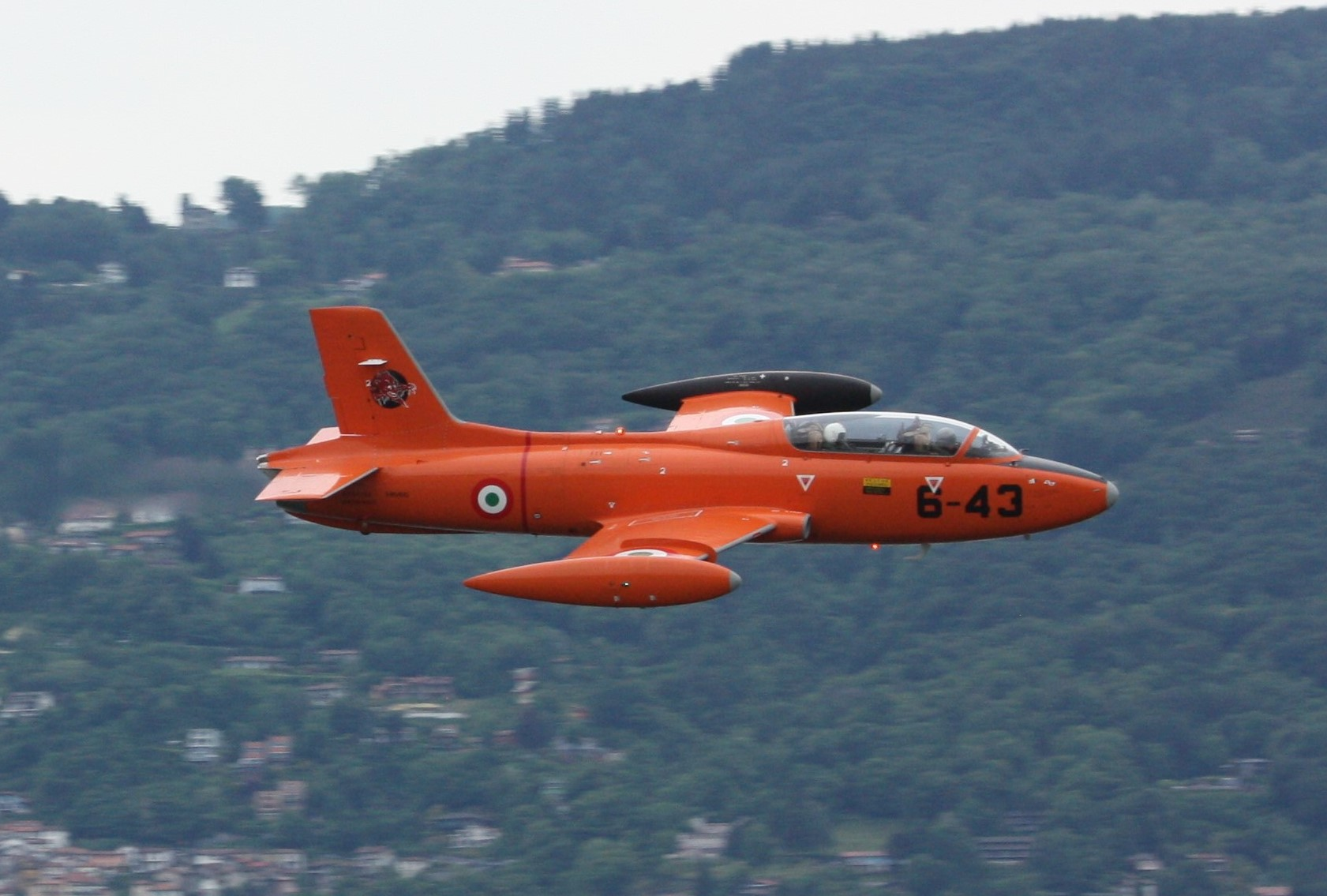
- An Aermacchi MB-326 similar to the one involved

Accident
- Date: 6 December 1990
- Summary: Fire on board, aircraft abandoned
- Site: Casalecchio di Reno, Emilia-Romagna, Italy; 44°28′46″N 11°15′55″E
- Total fatalities: 12
- Total injuries: 89

Aircraft
- Aircraft type: Aermacchi MB-326
- Operator: Italian Air Force
- Registration: MM54386
- Flight origin: Villafranca Airport, Verona, Italy
- Occupants: 1
- Crew: 1
- Fatalities: 0
- Injuries: 1
- Survivors: 1

Ground casualties
- Ground fatalities: 12
- Ground injuries: 88

On 6 December 1990, an MB-326 military jet of the Italian Air Force crashed into a school building at Casalecchio di Reno, near Bologna, Italy, killing 12 students and injuring 88 other students and staff. The aircraft had been abandoned minutes earlier by its pilot, who ejected following an on-board fire and loss of control.

The pilot and two senior air force officers were later put on trial and found guilty of involuntary manslaughter, receiving a sentence of 2 1/2 years in prison, but were subsequently acquitted on appeal.

== Accident ==
The MB-326 took off at 9:48 a.m. on 6 December 1990 from Verona Villafranca Airport, around 100 km (62 mi) north of Bologna, on a mission to test the effectiveness of an anti-aircraft radar system. The only person on board was the pilot, sub-lieutenant Bruno Viviani, 24, with 740 flight hours of experience, of which 140 were in the MB-326.

The planned route involved overflying the village of Borgoforte before heading towards the town of Rovigo. At 10:22 a.m., the engine started developing problems, prompting the pilot to abort the mission and seek to land. The nearest airfield, at Ferrara, had only a 600-metre-long runway, which was insufficient. Therefore, the pilot opted to head for Bologna Airport, around 40 km (25 mi) to the south.

At 10:31 a.m., while approaching Bologna, Viviani reported total engine failure, fire on board and flight controls unresponsive. After attempting to steer the aircraft towards open fields, he ejected and landed near Ceretolo, a village next to Casalecchio di Reno, suffering three fractured vertebrae.

An eyewitness at Bologna Airport reported seeing the aircraft on a normal approach path and with the landing gear extended. He then observed flames and white smoke coming out of the engine nozzle, before seeing the aircraft turning in the opposite direction to the airfield, the smoke turning black, and the pilot ejecting from the aircraft, which the eyewitness managed to photograph. The ejection and the flight of the aircraft for the following few seconds were also captured on video by the cameraman of a local TV station, Rete 7, who was filming in the area and happened to notice the unfolding disaster.

At 10:33 a.m., the pilotless aircraft crashed through the window of a first-floor classroom of the Gaetano Salvemini Technical Institute, a high school in Casalecchio, where a German class was about to finish. At that time, 285 students, 28 teachers and 4 staff were in the building, 17 of whom were in the classroom.

== Aircraft ==
The aircraft involved was an Aermacchi MB-326, a single-engine, two-seater jet trainer of the Italian Air Force, with registration number MM54386. It was part of the 3º Stormo (3rd Wing) based at Verona-Villafranca. Of the 136 aircraft delivered to the Italian Air Force starting from 1960, at the time of the accident only 58 survived, and they had already been replaced as trainer aircraft by the more modern MB-339. By then the MB-326 was used only to quickly connect airbases, tow targets and for miscellaneous roles such as in the accident flight.

== Aftermath ==
Video of the crash scene
- Video of the rescue operations taken by the Vigili del Fuoco fire service

The impact created a seven-metre-wide hole in the outer wall and set the classroom on fire. The fuselage and engine careered across the room and crashed through the back wall, sending flames and smoke through the rest of the building and trapping several people on the upper floor.

The emergency services arrived at the scene within minutes. A tradesman that was passing by in his van stopped and used his ladder to evacuate the first survivors. Several people jumped to the ground in panic from the upper floors of the building and were injured. The fire brigade then completed the evacuation of the building within half an hour, while paramedics administered first aid on the school's lawn to several injured.

== Casualties ==
Of the sixteen pupils present in the classroom at the time of the crash, all aged 15, twelve – eleven girls and one boy – were killed in the impact and fire; only four survived: three girls and one boy. The teacher who was giving the lesson survived as well, despite suffering severe burns. Eighty-eight other people were injured: 82 students and 6 adults. Of all the injured, 72 suffered permanent disability of varying degrees.

One of the survivors from the classroom, a girl, had remained trapped under one of the jet's wings, and was found only after all other survivors had been evacuated from the building, when the fire crews heard her cries for help. Some of the victims' bodies were burnt beyond recognition, and could be identified by parents and staff members only by looking at items of clothing or jewellery.

== Investigation and trial ==
At the time of the event, Italy's aviation safety agency (Agenzia Nazionale per la Sicurezza del Volo) had not yet been established, and the investigation into the accident was carried out by the public prosecutor's office. Viviani and two air force colonels – the commander of the 3rd Wing and the officer in charge of Villafranca airbase – were charged with multiple counts of involuntary manslaughter and culpable air disaster.

The prosecution argued that as soon as the engine started developing troubles, while near Ferrara, the pilot should have directed the aircraft to the east towards the Adriatic Sea and then ejected, instead of heading south towards Bologna airport, close to a densely populated area. According to the prosecution, the two other officers, who throughout the incident were in radio contact with Viviani from Villafranca, failed to give him proper instructions for a safe resolution of the emergency. In February 1995, they were all found guilty and sentenced to 2 1/2 years in prison.

In January 1997, the Court of Appeal overturned the sentence, ruling that no crime had been committed, and that the conduct of the three defendants during the incident was faultless. In January 1998, the Court of Cassation, Italy's highest court of appeal, rejected the prosecution's request to annul the appeal verdict, therefore definitively confirming the defendants' acquittal.

== Legacy ==
The tragedy left a profound mark on the local community of Casalecchio and surrounding towns. Four different victims' associations were created in the wake of the disaster, which in 1997 merged into the Associazione Vittime del Salvemini – 6 dicembre 1990 (Salvemini Victims Association – 6 December 1990). Many survivors and relatives of the victims rejected the outcome of the trial, and maintained that justice had not been done.

The building struck by the jet remained closed for over ten years. In 2001, it was repaired and reopened as Casa della Solidarietà "Alexander Dubček" (House of Solidarity "Alexander Dubček"), a public building hosting the local unit of the Protezione Civile (Italian Civil Protection) and the office of various local charities, including the victims association. The gaping hole in the wall left by the impact was preserved, closed only by a glass pane, and the classroom hit by the aircraft was turned into a memorial to the victims. In September 2020, the building was returned to school use for the first time in thirty years, after the COVID-19 pandemic forced schools to find more classroom space to ensure social distancing.

Several commemorations of the event have taken place over the years in Casalecchio, endorsed by the municipality of Casalecchio di Reno, with public talks and events on the themes of safety, solidarity and justice. In 2020, for the 30th anniversary of the disaster, the municipality organised two weeks of events including ceremonies, photo exhibitions, theatre and music productions, culminating in a livestreamed commemoration with messages from the Italian president Sergio Mattarella and the President of the European Parliament David Sassoli.

== See also ==
- Freckleton Air Disaster, where a Consolidated B-24H Liberator bomber crashed into a school building in England
- 1946 Apeldoorn Fairey Firefly FR.1 crash, where a solo pilot crashed his fighter into a school building in the Netherlands
- Air India Flight 171, where a Boeing 787-8 Dreamliner crashed into BJ Medical College in Ahmedabad, India
- 2025 Dhaka fighter jet crash, where a fighter jet crashed into the Milestone College campus in Dhaka, Bangladesh
