= Samanta Lal Sen =

Bangladeshi physician

- সামন্ত লাল সেন
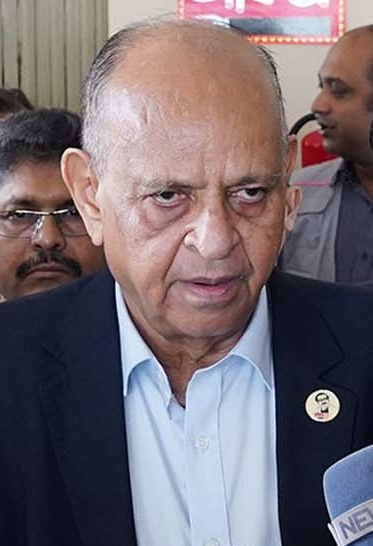
- Sen in 2024

Minister of Health and Family Welfare
- In office 11 January 2024 – 5 August 2024
- Prime Minister: Sheikh Hasina
- Preceded by: Zahid Maleque
- Succeeded by: Nurjahan Begum

Personal details
- Born: 24 November 1949 (age 76) Sylhet District, East Bengal, Dominion of Pakistan
- Party: Bangladesh Awami League
- Education: Chittagong Medical College
- Awards: Bangla Academy Fellowship (2018)

Samanta Lal Sen (born 24 November 1949) is a Bangladeshi physician and the former minister of Health and Family Welfare. Earlier, he was chief coordinator of the burn units across Bangladesh.

== Early life ==
Sen was born on 24 November 1949 in Habiganj, East Bengal, Pakistan. In 1973, he completed his MBBS from Chittagong Medical College. He did a diploma in specialized surgery in 1980 from Austria.

== Career ==
Sen worked under Professors Kabiruddin and Mohammad Shahidullah of the Burn and Plastic Surgery unit at Dhaka Medical College Hospital before taking over the unit. He was the project director of the Burn and Plastic Surgery Unit of the Dhaka Medical College Hospital.

In February 2011, Sen was appointed the chief coordinator of all burn units in Bangladesh.

Sen, national coordinator of the National Institute of Burn and Plastic Surgery at the Dhaka Medical College Hospital, met Prime Minister Sheikh Hasina in July 2017 to seek financial support for a patient.

Sen was awarded the Bangla Academy Fellowship in 2018. Human Rights and Peace for Bangladesh gave Sen the HRPB Award-2016. Sen was the coordinator of the Sheikh Hasina National Institute of Burn and Plastic Surgery.

In January 2024, Sen was appointed Minister of Health and Family Welfare, replacing Zahid Maleque. Sen was surprised at his appointment. He spoke against corruption after taking office.
