= Bogra Airport =

Military airport in Bogura, Bangladesh

BAF Base, Bogura বিএএফ ঘাঁটি, বগুড়া
- IATA: none; ICAO: VGBG

Summary
- Airport type: Military
- Operator: Bangladesh Air Force
- Serves: Bogra
- Location: Bangladesh
- Opened: March 12, 2005
- Elevation AMSL: 65 ft (20 m)
- Coordinates: 24°52′0.4″N 89°18′59.5″E

Map
- Location of Bangladesh International Airport in Bangladesh

Runways
Direction	Length		Surface
Direction	ft	m	Surface
12/30	5,000	1,525	Asphalt
- Source: Landings.com

BAF Station Bogura (ICAO: VGBG) is a Bangladeshi Air Force base but planned for public use airport 7 kilometres (4.3 mi) northwest of Bogra, in northern Bangladesh. It is operated by the Bangladesh Air Force. As of July 2015, no scheduled passenger flights serve the airport, but civil air operations are allowed with prior approval. In March, 2025 Chairman of Civil Aviation Authority of Bangladesh and Chief of Air staff of Bangladesh Air Force paid a visit to this airport and spoke for reopening this airport for civil use in July 2026.

== History ==
The airport was dedicated on 12 March 2005. According to the Civil Aviation Authority of Bangladesh (CAAB), airlines do not serve Bogra because demand is too low for a route to be commercially viable without smaller aircraft than those the airlines operate. The Independent reported a senior CAAB official as saying, "If the airlines are not interested in using our airports, we can't force them to." The same official said a government subsidy could convince airlines to use Bogra. For now, airport staff are paid without having to work.

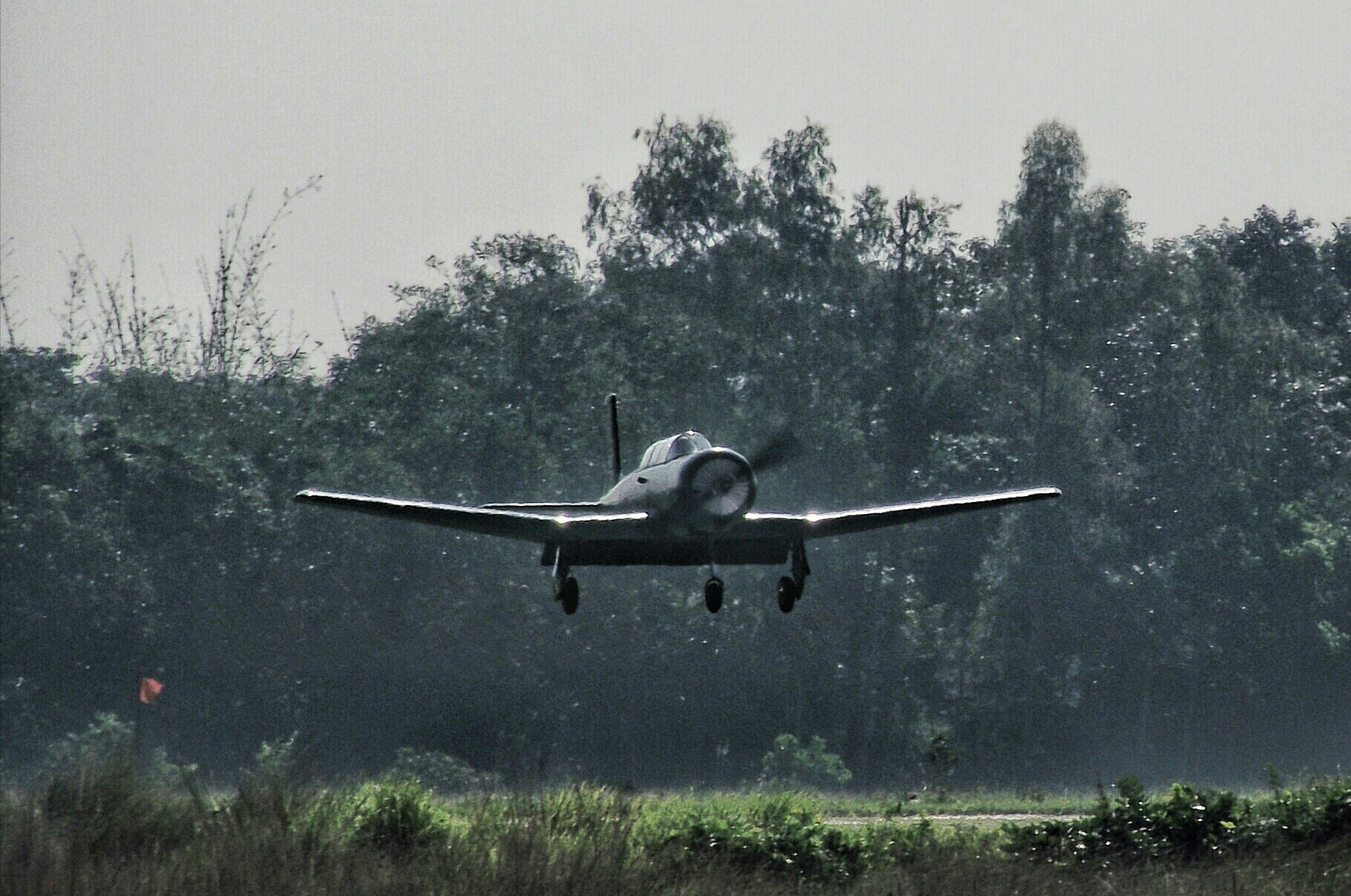
Bangladesh Air Force trainer PT-06 aircraft landing at Bogra STOL airport at 9 A.M in September 2016.

Bangladesh Air Force currently use this airport for general duty pilot training.

== Incidents and accidents ==
- On 22 October 2009, a PT-6 training aircraft of the Bangladesh Air Force experienced engine trouble shortly after takeoff from Bogra. It crash-landed on the runway and flipped over, severely damaging the aircraft and injuring the pilot and co-pilot.

== See also ==
- List of airports in Bangladesh
