= Bangabandhu Basic Trainer =

Military training aircraft

The Bangabandhu Basic Trainer is a family of light training aircraft developed in Bangladesh for the Bangladesh Air Force (BAF). Built as a primary steps toward establishing a domestic aerospace manufacturing ecosystem, the aircraft family includes two main variants: the BBT-1 and the BBT-2. The BBT-1 holds historical significance as the first aircraft locally manufactured in Bangladesh.

The BBT-1 was initiated in January 2020 as a joint project by the Bangladesh Aeronautical Centre, and the Aviation and Aerospace University, Bangladesh, with production based at Lalmonirhat Airport. The BBT-1 is considered the first aircraft to be locally manufactured in Bangladesh.

On 24 March 2024, the BBT-2 successfully completed its maiden flight.

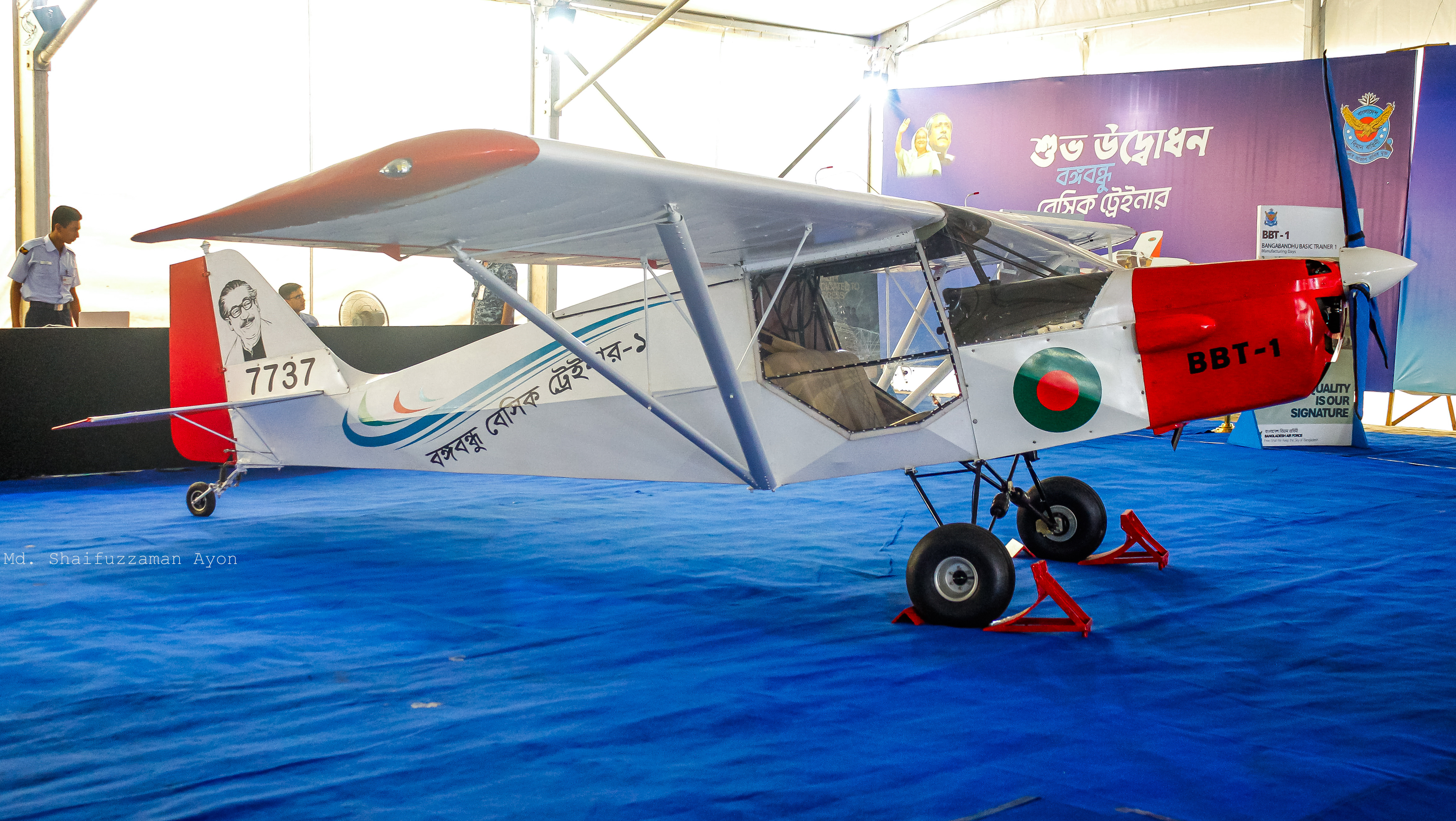
BBT-1 at Military Hardware Display 2024

== BBT-2 ==
The BBT-2 is a military basic trainer and light attack aircraft developed jointly by the Bangladesh Aeronautical Centre (BAC) and Aermacchi, a subsidiary of the Italian defense company Leonardo. Featuring a retractable tricycle landing gear and a low-wing configuration, the modern aircraft is powered by a 340 kW Rolls-Royce M250 turboprop engine. It is capable of reaching a maximum speed of 354 km/h, with a range of 1,000 km and a service ceiling of approximately 6,500 m.

The BBT-2 has a two-person crew capacity and can accommodate two additional passengers or a stretcher with a patient in emergency situations. It is equipped with advanced avionics and safety systems sourced from leading U.S. and European manufacturers, including Honeywell, Garmin, and Martin-Baker. Designed as a side-by-side seat military trainer, the aircraft is currently undergoing test flights. The initial test flight took place in November 2023, and the BBT-2 successfully completed its official maiden flight on 24 March 2024.
