= Shamshernagar Airport =

Domestic and military airport in Bangladesh

BAF Station Shamshernagar বিএএফ স্টেশন শমশেরনগর
- IATA: ZHM; ICAO: VGSH

Summary
- Airport type: Military
- Operator: Bangladesh Air Force
- Serves: Moulvibazar & Srimangal
- Location: Bangladesh
- Elevation AMSL: 58 ft (18 m)
- Coordinates: 24°23′53.7″N 91°55′1.0″E

Map
- Location of Shamshernagar Airport in Bangladesh

Runways
Direction	Length		Surface
Direction	ft	m	Surface
17/35	5,200	1,585	Concrete
- Source: Landings.com

BAF Station Shamshernagar or BAF Station Moulvibazar (IATA: ZHM, ICAO: VGSH) is a one of nine Bangladeshi Air Force bases and a former public airport located 17 kilometres (11 mi) southeast of the town of Moulvibazar, Bangladesh. It is the only airport in Sylhet Division other than the Osmani International Airport. Due to the short length of the runway it is restricted to STOL aircraft. As of July 2015, no scheduled passenger flights serve the airport, but civil air operations are allowed with prior approval.

During WWII, Shamshernagar was a major hub for flights “Over the Hump” from what was then British India to China. The flights were dangerous, as on March 11, 1945, when a C-109 cargo plane departed Shamshernager for Chengdu, China and soon disappeared. Material stockpiled by the US at Shamshernager (but never used) included chemical weapons, specifically 18 rail wagon loads of 1,000-pound bombs filled with cyanogen chloride. The U.S. 61st Air Service Group was based at Shamshernagar in the final months of World War II.

On 31 December 1970, a Fokker F-27 Friendship 200 of Pakistan International Airlines on approach to Shamshernagar crash-landed short of the runway, turned over to the right, and burned. Seven of the 31 passengers on board died.

According to East Pakistan Air Operations, 1971, during the Bangladesh Liberation War, Shamshernagar was the base of the first fighting formation of what would become the Bangladesh Air Force: a DC-3 Dakota, a DHC-3 Otter, and an Alouette III helicopter together known as Kilo Force.

According to CAAB, currently airlines do not serve Shamshernagar because demand is too low for the route to be commercially viable without smaller aircraft than those the airlines operate. The Independent reported a senior CAAB official as saying, "If the airlines are not interested in using our airports, we can't force them to." The same official said a government subsidy could convince airlines to use Shamshernagar. As it is now, airport staff are paid without having to work.

== Airlines and destination ==
Currently there are no scheduled flights operated by any airlines.

== See also ==
- List of airports in Bangladesh
- Osmani International Airport
