= Bangladesh Air Force =

Air warfare branch of the Bangladesh Armed Forces

- বাংলাদেশ বিমান বাহিনী
- Emblem of Bangladesh Air Force
- Founded: 28 September 1971; 55 years ago
- Country: Bangladesh
- Type: Air force
- Role: Aerial warfare
- Size: 17,400 active duty personnel 3,700 civilians 191 aircraft
- Part of: Bangladesh Armed Forces
- Headquarters: Dhaka Cantonment
- Mottos: বাংলার আকাশ রাখিব মুক্ত (English: "Free shall we keep the sky of Bengal")
- Colours: Service uniform: Light Sky Blue, Prussian Blue; Combat uniform: Deep Sky Blue, Prussian Blue, Black, Grey
- Mascot: Flying Eagle
- Anniversaries: 28 September (Air Force Day); 21 November (Armed Forces Day)
- Engagements: List: Bangladesh Liberation War; Chittagong Hill Tracts operation; 2015 Bangladesh–Arakan Army border clash; United Nations peacekeeping missions
- Website: baf.mil.bd

Commanders
- Commander-In-Chief: President Mirza Fakhrul Islam Alamgir
- Chief of Air Staff: Air Chief Marshal Hasan Mahmood Khan

Insignia
- Ensign

- Roundel

- Fin flash

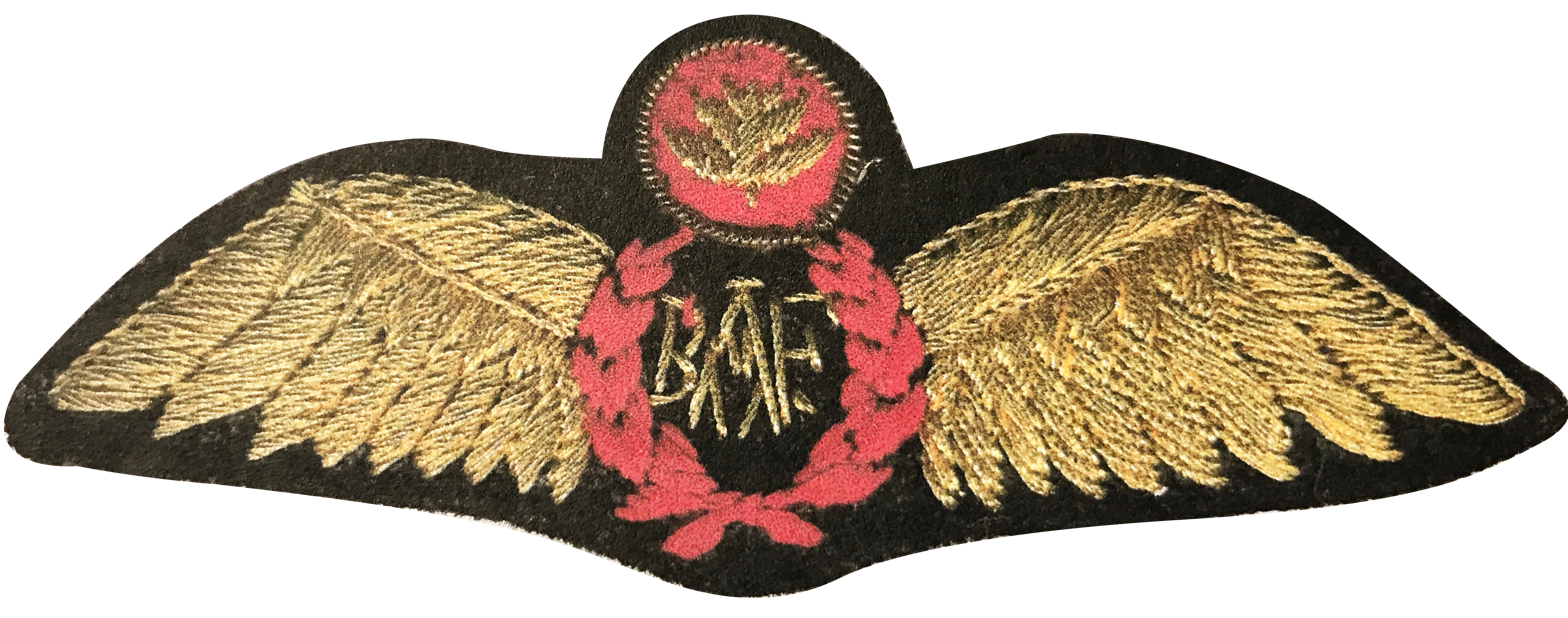
- Aviator badge

Aircraft flown
- Attack: Yakovlev Yak-130
- Fighter: MiG-29, Chengdu F-7BG/BG1
- Helicopter: Bell 212, Mil Mi-17, AW139
- Interceptor: Chengdu F-7BG/BG1
- Reconnaissance: Selex ES Falco
- Trainer: G-120TP, PT-6, AW119kx, Bell 206, K-8W, Yak-130, BBT-2, BBT-1, Chengdu FT-7A/B/BG/BG1
- Transport: C-130J, C-130, An-32, L-410

The Bangladesh Air Force (Bengali: বাংলাদেশ বিমান বাহিনী; abbreviated as BAF) is the aerial warfare branch of the Bangladesh Armed Forces, responsible for defending the airspace of Bangladesh and supporting national security operations. Operating under the Ministry of Defence, the BAF conducts air defence, reconnaissance, transport, and disaster relief missions. Established during the 1971 Liberation War, the Bangladesh Air Force has actively participated in United Nations peacekeeping operations and regional security initiatives.

The Bangladesh Air Force was officially created on 28 September 1971. Operation Kilo Flight was an operation conducted by the Bangladesh Air Force during the Bangladesh Liberation War. The BAF engages in humanitarian activities in Bangladesh (in any natural calamities, e.g., flood relief activities), and also it takes part in United Nations peacekeeping missions.

== History ==
=== Foundation ===
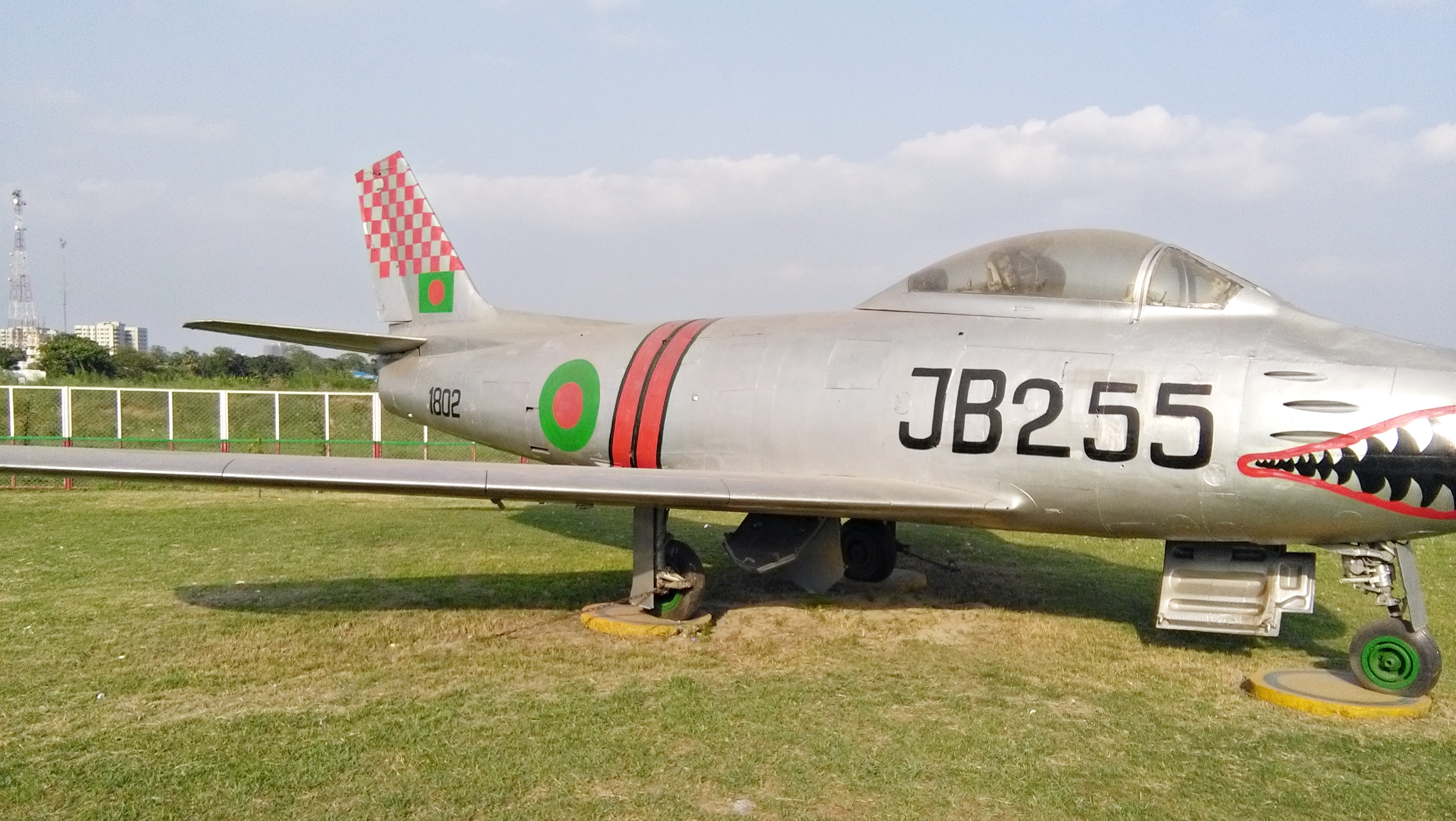
A BAF F-86 Sabre in the BAF Museum

The Bangladesh Air Force (BAF) was officially formed on 28 September 1971 during the Bangladesh Liberation War. It consisted of revolting Bengali officers and airmen who defected from the Pakistan Air Force at Dimapur Airport in the Indian state of Nagaland. It was launched formally by flying three repaired vintage aircraft on 8 October 1971. BAF's initial personnel were around 1,000 Bengali members of the Pakistan Air Force, who were stationed in East Pakistan at the outbreak of the war and who defected to the Bangladeshi side. At that time, the embryo of the BAF was formed with less than a hundred officers and around 900 airmen. These numbers were gradually strengthened by the slow but steady defection from among the around 3,000 Bengali officers and airmen stationed and grounded in West Pakistan. By the first week of December, a total of 700 Bengali officers and airmen had defected from the western border. A significant number of BAF personnel participated in the ground warfare roles in the conflict. During the war, initially, officers of the BAF attached to the then Bangladesh Government were Chief Representative to Chakulia Guerrilla Training Camp Squadron Leader M. Hamidullah Khan, Group Captain A. K. Khandker, DCOS Army (Liaison) later Sub-Sector Commander and as Commander - Sector 11, Flight Lieutenant Liaqat as Battalion Adjutant, Flying Officer Rouf, Flying Officer Ashraf, and Flight Sergeant Shafiqullah as company commanders. Squadron Leader Sadruddin Hossain, Squadron Leader Wahidur Rahim, Squadron Leader Nurul Qader, Squadron Leader Shamsur Rahman, and Squadron Leader Ataur Rahman as sub sector company commanders. Wing Commander Khademul Bashar participated in the war as Commander-Sector 6.

Indian civilian authorities and the IAF donated 1 DC-3 Dakota (gifted by the Maharaja of Jodhpur), 1 Twin Otter plane, and 1 Alouette III helicopter for the new-born Bangladesh Air Force. The Bengali rank and file fixed up the World War II vintage runway at Dimapur Airport, then began rigging the aircraft for combat duty. The Dakota was modified to carry 500-pound bombs, but for technical reasons, it was only used to ferry Bangladesh government personnel. The Alouette III helicopter was rigged to fire 14 rockets from pylons attached to its side and had .303 Browning machine guns installed, in addition to having 1-inch (25 mm) steel plate welded to its floor for extra protection. The Twin Otter boasted 7 rockets under each of its wings and could deliver ten 25-pound bombs, which were rolled out of the aircraft by hand through a makeshift door. This tiny force was dubbed Kilo Flight, the first fighting formation of the nascent Bangladesh Air Force. Squadron Leader Sultan Mahmud was appointed as the commander of the 'Kilo Flight'.

The Bangladesh Air Force first went into action on 3 December 1971, at the start of the Indo-Pakistani war of 1971, and attacked the Chattogram-based oil tank depot. The oil tank depot was totally destroyed by that air attack. The air attack was conducted by Capt. Akram Ahmed. The second Bangladesh Air Force attack was on 6 December 1971 at Moulvibazar Pakistani Army barracks under the command of Squadron Leader Sultan Mahmud, where Captain Shahabuddin Ahmed was co-pilot.

After the surrender of Pakistan, all personnel reported to Bangladesh Forces commander-in-chief, Col. M. A. G. Osmani. On 7 April 1972, the post of the chief of air staff went into effect by order of the President of Bangladesh. The combined command of Bangladesh Forces had been abolished with effect from 7 April 1972 and replaced by three separate commands for the three services with acting chiefs of staff. The Bangladesh Air Force gradually began to reoccupy and reform all the airbase structures throughout the country, HQ administrative buildings, and fuel and weapons depots.

For participating in the war, the air force won one Bir Sreshtho, six Bir Uttom, one Bir Bikrom, and fifteen Bir Protik.

=== After independence ===
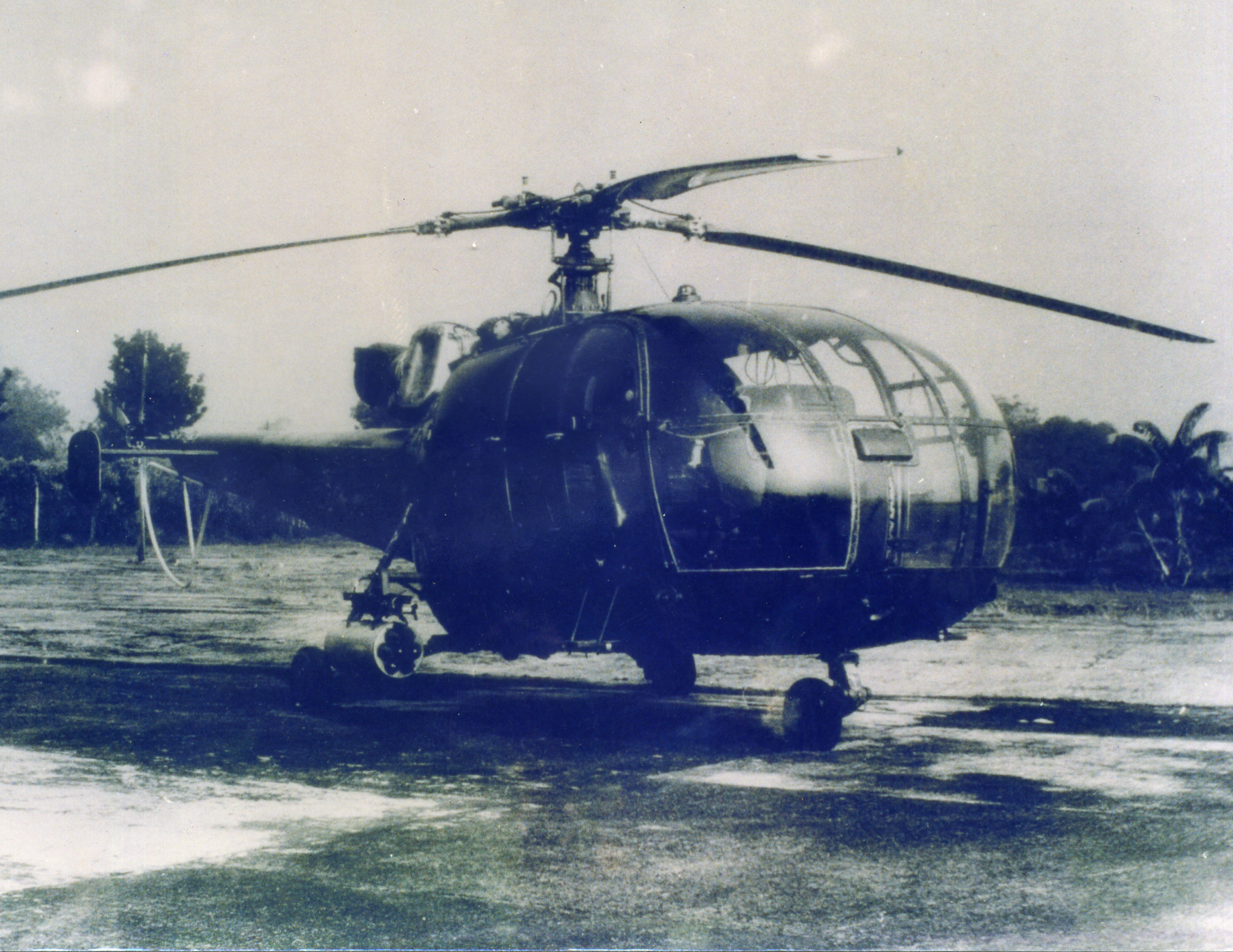
The Alouette III was the first helicopter used by the Air Force, providing close air support during the Bangladesh Liberation War

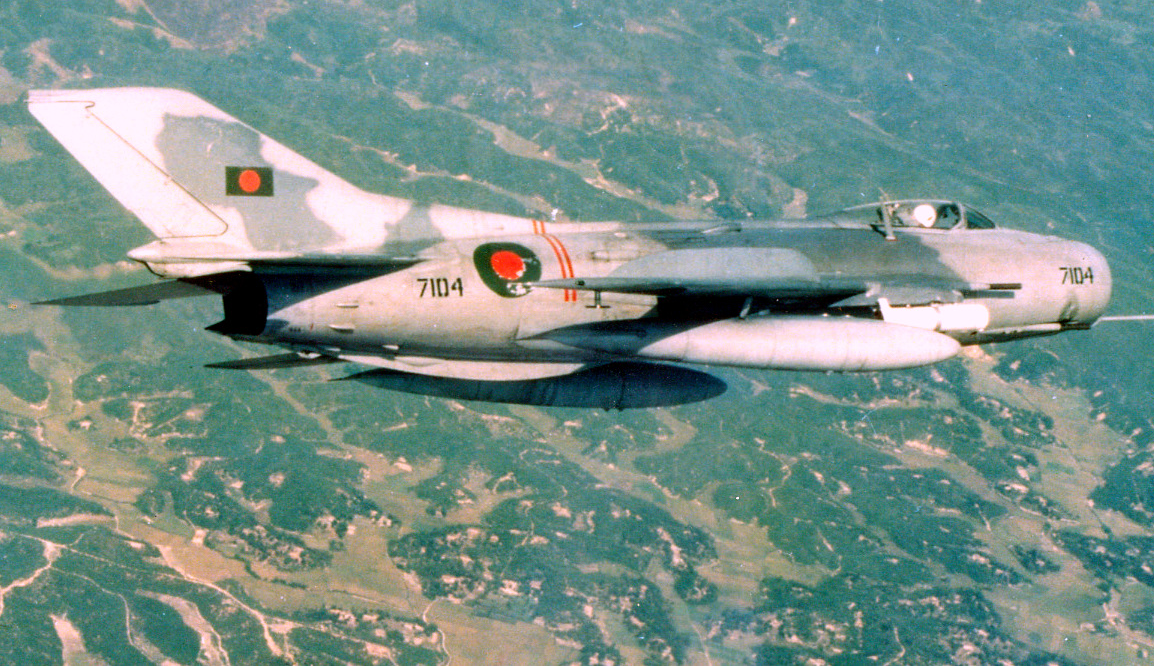
A former Shenyang J-6 fighter aircraft of the Bangladesh Air Force

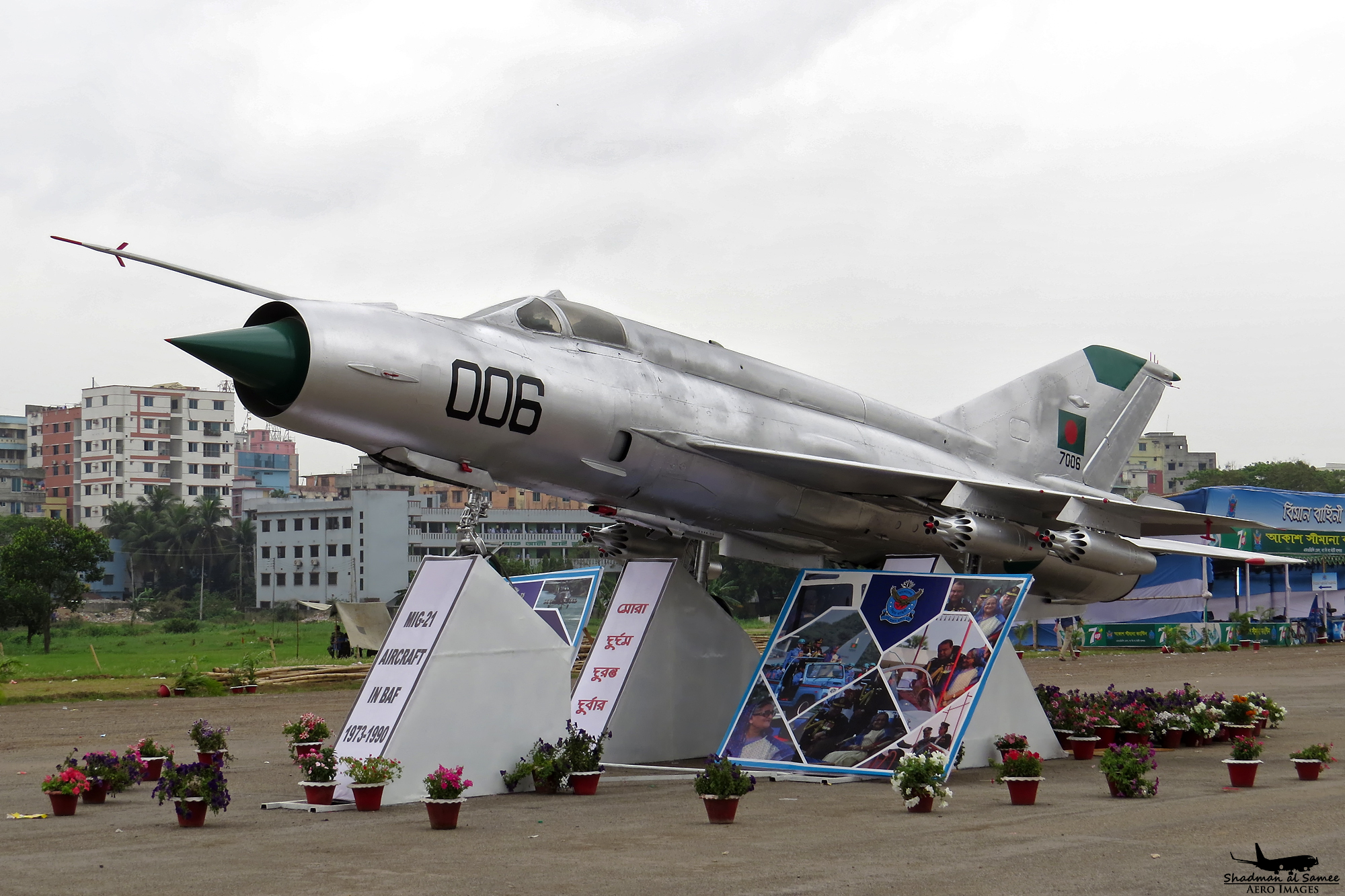
BAF MiG-21MF on display at BAF Base Bashar. The first supersonic fighter operated by the BAF.

After independence, in November–December 1972, the BAF received a significant donation from the former USSR. Among the aircraft delivered were ten single-seat Mikoyan-Gurevich MiG-21MFs, two twin-seat Mikoyan-Gurevich MiG-21UMs, and twelve Mil Mi-8 utility helicopters. Later on, China also supplied some equipment. Apart from the aircraft of Kilo Flight, which were donated by India, most Pakistan Air Force aircraft grounded in Dhaka due to runway cratering by the Indian Air Force during the liberation war were sabotaged before surrender. Of these, four Canadair Sabres were also returned to service by Bangladeshi ground technicians in 1972. The Pakistan Air Force, prior to 1971, had many Bengali pilots, air traffic controllers, technicians, and administrative officers, and the general Bengali representation in the Pakistan Air Force was around 15% (and 18% in the officer ranks) of the 25,000-odd manpower of the Pakistan Air Force in 1971, which, although lower than their share in the population (50%), was much higher than the 6% numbers in the Army. Many of them distinguished themselves during the Bangladesh Liberation War; they provided the nascent Bangladesh Air Force with a good number of trained personnel. It had grown with the repatriation of the around 2,000 Air Force personnel from Pakistan in 1973 after the Simla Agreement.

In 1977, some personnel of the Bangladesh Air Force, led by Sergeant Afsar, attempted to stage a coup, which resulted in the deaths of 11 air force officers. After the mutiny was put down by the then provost marshal, Wing Commander M. Hamidullah Khan, President Ziaur Rahman even considered disbanding the Bangladesh Air Force in favour of an army aviation wing. However, this plan did not go ahead. President Ziaur Rahman placed Hamidullah in charge of Command and Communication Control at the old parliamentary building, present day Prime Minister's office. Hamidullah reorganized the forces intelligence to the directorate general level under the authority of the president. Hence DGFI was born.

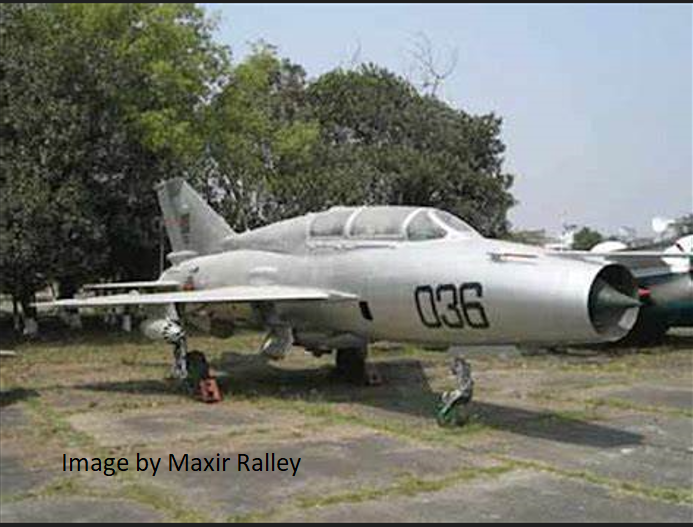
A former MiG-21UB of the Bangladesh Air Force.

Defence co-operation improved with Pakistan considerably under the government of Ziaur Rahman and the military regime of Hussain Muhammad Ershad in Bangladesh, which had grown more distant from its wartime ally India. Common concerns over India's regional meddling have influenced strategic co-operation leading to a gift of several squadrons of refurbished Shenyang F-6 fighter aircraft from Pakistan to the Bangladesh Air Force in the late 1980s. Bangladesh bought 8 MiG-29s from Russia in 1999 under Prime Minister Sheikh Hasina.

The Bangladesh Air Force Academy (BAFA) received National Colours in 2003 from the then-Prime Minister Khaleda Zia. The Recruits' Training School (RTS) was awarded BAF Colours by ex-chief of air staff (AVM Fakhrul Azam) in 2004. In 2017, the Bangladesh Air Force was awarded the Independence Day Award.

=== COVID-19 pandemic operations ===
The Bangladesh Air Force was active during the COVID-19 pandemic. The BAF provided emergency medevac for many critical COVID-19 patients with their helicopters. BAF also evacuated immigrants and migrant workers, and airlifted tons of relief materials for home and abroad with their C-130B and C-130J cargo aircraft.

=== Forces Goal 2030 ===
The Bangladesh Air Force has an ambitious modernisation plan to be implemented in upcoming years under Forces Goal 2030. As per the goal, the air force is to be a strong deterrent force to well protect the sky of Bangladesh. Plans are made to strengthen both air power and land based air defence capabilities. Since the formulation of the forces goal 2030, the BAF has developed in many folds.

The Bangladesh Air Force has set up an advanced training unit named the 105 Advance Jet Training Unit which is a dedicated fighter pilot training unit of the BAF. The unit consists of three training squadrons, which will provide advanced training to the pilots selected for operating the fighter jets.

Since 2010, the BAF has taken delivery of sixteen Chengdu F-7BGI fighter aircraft, sixteen Yakovlev Yak-130 advanced jet trainers, two C-130J transport aircraft, nine K-8W jet trainer aircraft, three Let L-410 Turbolet transport trainer aircraft, and twenty-three CJ-6 basic trainers. The process is going on for the procurement of sixteen multirole combat aircraft.

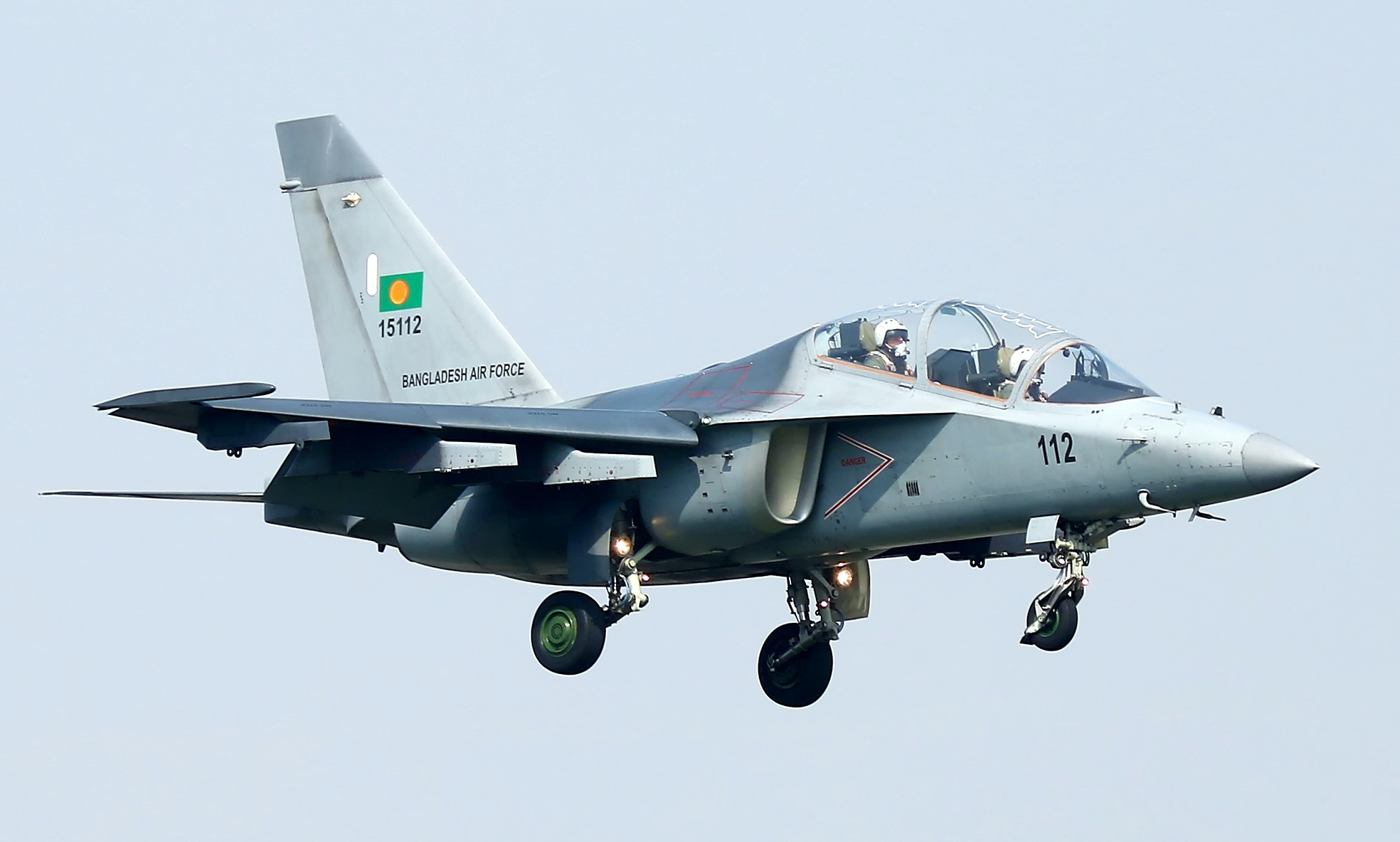
A Yakovlev Yak-130 on final approach

The BAF has also taken delivery of 21 Mi-171Sh combat transport helicopters, four AgustaWestland AW139 maritime SAR helicopters, and two AW 119KX training helicopters since 2010. The procurement process for eight attack helicopters is ongoing.

The BAF gained surface-to-air missile capability by introducing FM-90 short-range air defence missiles in 2011. To date, BAF has taken delivery of two regiments of FM-90 systems. The BAF received an Italian long-range Selex RAT-31DL air defence radar in 2019.

Bangladesh has signed a government-to-government contract with the United Kingdom for the supply of two off-the-shelf C-130J aircraft currently in service with the Royal Air Force. In June 2019, another contract was signed for the procurement of an additional three off-the-shelf C-130J aircraft from the UK. As of September 2020, three of the aircraft have been delivered.

On 20 June 2018, the Bangladesh Air Force signed a contract with China National Aero-Technology Import & Export Corporation (CATIC) for the procurement of seven K-8 jet training aircraft. On 15 October 2020, BAF received these seven K-8 jet trainers.

=== Recruitment of airwomen ===
For the first time in the history of the BAF, women were recruited as airwomen in 2020. On 25 November 2020, after nine months of training, 64 women passed out from the 'Recruits Training School', which is situated in Shamshernagar (Moulvibazar District), as Aircraftman - II (AC-II), the batch was '48th Entry'.

=== UN mission deployment ===
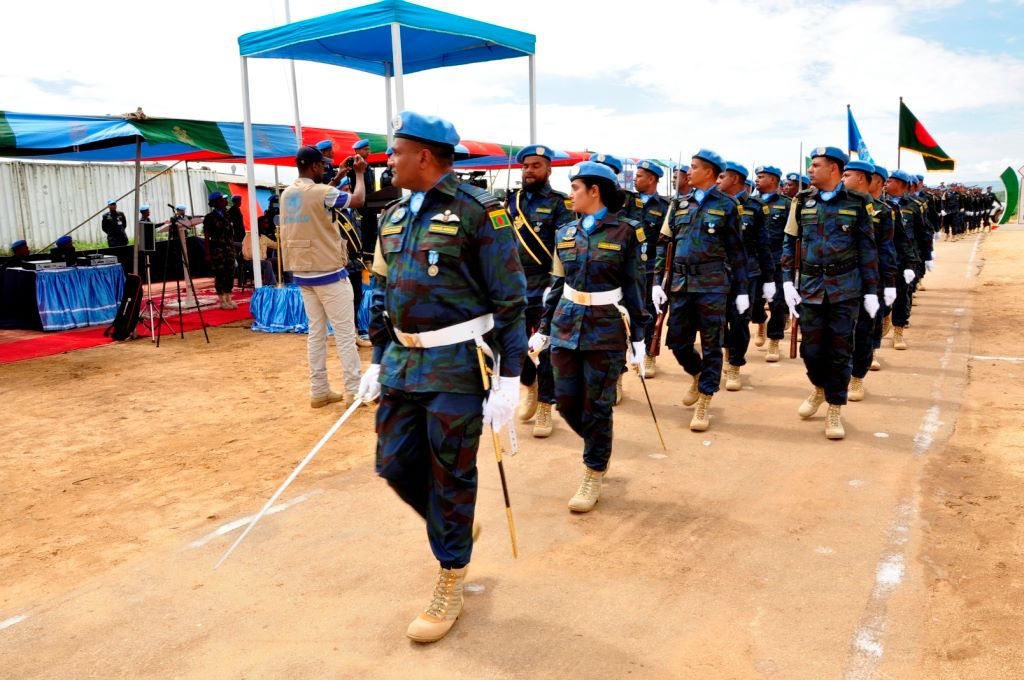
Bangladesh Air Force UN Peacekeeping Force at Bunia, Democratic Republic of Congo, 2016; a lady officer is seen in this parade, the BAF takes women as officers since 2000.

More than 600 BAF personnel, including officers and airmen, and 10 BAF helicopters are currently deployed to various UN missions. Another C-130 transport aircraft is providing support to a UN mission in Africa. With the deployment of C-130 aircraft and its personnel, Bangladesh became the largest troop-contributing country on UN peacekeeping missions.

== Chief of Air Staff ==
The Bangladesh Air Force is headed by an air officer, and he is in the rank of air chief marshal. In 1972, this chief of air staff (COAS) was created (in April 1972), and the first air chief was A. K. Khandker, whose rank was air vice marshal. All air chiefs till Fakhrul Azam (served as air chief from 2002 to 2007) were air vice marshals; Shah Mohammad Ziaur Rahman was the first air chief who served in this post in the rank of air marshal from 2007 to 2012. Abu Esrar (served as air chief from 2015 to 2018) was the first person who served as air chief in the rank of air chief marshal. Since then, all air chiefs have been air chief marshals.

== Organisation ==
According to the Constitution of Bangladesh, the president of Bangladesh acts as the civilian commander-in-chief, and the Chief of Air Staff (COAS), by statute a four-star air officer (air chief marshal), commands the Air Force. The Bangladesh Air Force is currently commanded by Air Chief Marshal Hasan Mahmood Khan. The Bangladesh Air Force (BAF) has its headquarters at Dhaka Cantonment. HQ has 4 branches: Operations & Training (Ops. & Trng.), Administration (Admin.), Maintenance (Mte.), and Plannings (Plans). Each branch is headed by officers who are considered principal staff officer (PSO) and known as assistant chief of air staff, e.g., ACAS (Ops & Trng). Under each PSO, there are various directorates headed by directors of air commodore rank. Under each director, there are deputy directors (DD) headed by group captain and staff officers (SO) with the rank of wing commander and below.

- Office of the Chief of Air Staff (COAS)
- Air Secretary's Branch
- Chief Inspector's Office
- Directorate of Air Intelligence
- Judge Advocate General
- Operations and Training Branch
- Directorate of Air Defence
- Directorate of Air Operations
- Directorate of Air Traffic Services
- Directorate of Air Training
- Directorate of Education
- Directorate of Flight Safety
- Directorate of Cyber Warfare and Information Technology
- Directorate of Meteorology
- Directorate of Overseas Air Operations
- Administration Branch
- Directorate of Provost Marshal
- Directorate of Administrative Co-ordination
- Directorate of Finance
- Directorate of Medical Services (Air)
- Directorate of Personnel
- Chief Engineer's Office (Air)
- Directorate of Works
- Directorate of Welfare and Ceremony
- Maintenance Branch
- Directorate of Armament and Weapons
- Directorate of Communication and Electronics
- Directorate of Engineering
- Directorate of Supply
- Planning Branch
- Directorate of Plans
- Directorate of Flight Safety
- Directorate of Recruitment
- Directorate of Project
- Directorate of Administrative Co-ordination
- Directorate of Section

=== Officers branches ===
Branches of officers of Bangladesh Air Force are:

- General Duties (Pilot), abbreviation: GD(P)
- General Duties (Navigator), abbreviation: GD(N)
- Engineering
- Air Defense Weapons Controlling (ADWC)
- Air Traffic control (ATC)
- Meteorology
- Logistics
- Administration
- Finance/Accounts
- Education
- Legal
- Medical (officers are seconded from army)

=== Airmen's trade groups ===
Trade groups of airmen are as follows:

1. Aircraft Engineering
2. Electrical and Instrument Engineering
3. General Engineering
4. Mechanical Transport Engineering
5. Armament Engineering
6. Radio Engineering
7. Ground Signalling
8. Radar Operating
9. Life Saving Equipment
10. Photography
11. Air Traffic Control
12. Education
13. Cypher
14. Meteorological
15. Medical
16. Secretarial
17. Supply
18. General Service
19. Mechanical Transport Operator
20. Provost
21. Catering
22. Musician
23. Aircrew

=== Squadrons ===
There are several squadrons in the air force. These not only include flying squadrons, but also engineering and field units.

Squadron No	Insignia	Names/Motto	Air Force Base	Aircraft
1		"The Pioneers"	Chattogram	(MI-17, MI-171SH,) SAR unit: (AW-139, Bell-212)
3	No 3 squadron	"The Unicorns"	Chattogram	Antonov AN-32B
5	5th Squadron BAF	"Supersonic Defenders"	Chattogram	(F-7BG, FT-7BG)
8	8th squadron BAF	"Vigilance Valour Victory"	Kurmitola, Dhaka	(MiG-29BM, MiG-29UBM, MiG-29B, MiG-29UB)
9	9th Squadron BAF	"The Scorpions"	Tejgaon, Dhaka	Bell 212
11	11 squadron	"উদয়ের পথে নির্ভীক"	Jashore	PT-6
12	No 12 squadron	"নীলিমায় দূর্বার"	Jashore	Grob G 120
15	No 15 squadron	"Dauntless in the Horizon"	Jashore	K-8W
18	No 18 squadron	"Rotary wing trainers"	Jashore	Bell-206 L-2
21	21 squadron	"The Avengers"	Chattogram	Yak-130
25	25th squadron BAF	"The Trendsetters"	Kurmitola, Dhaka	(FT-7A, FT-7B)
31	No 31 squadron	"Beyond the call of Duty"	Tejgaon, Dhaka	MI-171 SH
35	35th squadron BAF	"The Thundercats"	Kurmitola, Dhaka	(F-7BG1, FT-7BG1)
41		''Airborne''	BAF Base Shamshernagar, Maulavibazar	
101	No 101 squadron	"Excellence & Beyond"	Tejgaon, Dhaka	(C-130B, C-130J, MI-171)
103(ATTU)	103 squadron		Tejgaon, Dhaka	L-410
105 (AJTU)	No 105 squadron	"Trident"	Chattogram	Yak-130
Flying Instructor School		"Aurulia Bogura"	BAF Station Bogura, Bogura	CJ-6

== Rank structure ==
=== Officers ===
Rank group	General / flag officers				Senior officers			Junior officers
Bangladesh Air Force
Bangladesh Air Force	এয়ার চিফ মার্শাল; Ēẏār chiph mārśāl	এয়ার মার্শাল; Ēẏār mārśāl	এয়ার ভাইস মার্শাল; Ēẏār bhā'is mārśāl	এয়ার কমোডোর; Ēẏār kômōḍōr	গ্রুপ ক্যাপ্টেন; Grup kaepṭēn	উইং কমান্ডার; U'iṁ kômānḍār	স্কোয়াড্রন লীডার; Skōẏāḍran līḍār	ফ্লাইট লেফটেন্যান্ট; Phlā'iṭ lēphṭēnānṭ	ফ্লাইং অফিসার; Phlā'iṁ ôphisār	পাইলট অফিসার; Pā'ilôṭ Ôphisār

=== Airmen ===
Rank group	Junior commissioned officers			Non-commissioned officer	Enlisted
Bangladesh Air Force								No insignia
Bangladesh Air Force	মাস্টার ওয়ারেন্ট অফিসার; Māsṭār ōẏārēnṭ ôphisār	সিনিয়র ওয়ারেন্ট অফিসার; Siniẏar ōẏārēnṭ ôphisār	ওয়ারেন্ট অফিসার; Ōẏārēnṭ ôphisār	সার্জেন্ট; Sārjēnṭ	কর্পোর‍্যাল; Kôrpōral	লীডিং এয়ারক্র্যাফটম্যান; Līḍing ēẏārkrāphṭmaen	এয়ারক্র্যাফটম্যান-১; Ēẏārkrāphṭmaen-1	এয়ারক্র্যাফটম্যান-২; Ēẏārkrāphṭmaen-2

== Installations and bases ==
The Bangladesh Air Force is organized under centralized Air Force Headquarters in Dhaka Cantonment, which oversees all operational, training, and support units.

=== Chief of Air Staff ===
- Personnel Directorate
- Operations Directorate
- Intelligence Directorate
- Logistics Directorate
- Engineering & Maintenance Directorate
- Training & Education Directorate
- Air Defense & Missile Directorate
- Air Surveillance & Command Directorate
- Planning and Development Directorate

=== Combat air commands ===
1. BAF Base Khademul Bashar, Tejgaon, Dhaka
2. BAF Base Bir Uttom A. K. Khandker, Kurmitola, Dhaka
3. BAF Base Birshreshto Matiur Rahman, Jashore
4. Bangladesh Air Force Academy, Jashore
  1. Basic Flying Training Squadron
  2. Advanced Flying Training Squadron
5. BAF Base Zahurul Haque, Chattogram
6. Airmen Training Institute, Chittagong
  1. Airmen Technical Training Squadron
  2. Airmen Non-Commissioned Officer Training Squadron
7. BAF Base Cox's Bazar
8. BAF Base Bir Uttam Sultan Mahmud, Tangail
9. BAF Base Shamshernagar, Maulavibazar
10. Recruits Training School, Shamshernagar, Moulvibazar
  1. Ground Training Squadron
  2. Technical Training Squadron
11. BAF Station, Bogura
  1. Flying Instructor School, Bogura
  2. Flight Safety & Evaluation Unit
  3. Air Defense Radar Unit
12. BAF Station, Barishal

=== Air Defense Command ===
- Surface-to-Air Missile (SAM) Unit
- Radar & Early Warning Stations
- Command & Control Units

=== Air Logistics Command ===
- Air Transport Squadron (C-130J / An-32)
- VIP Transport Squadron (Helicopter / Fixed-wing)
- Maintenance & Repair Squadrons

=== Air Training Command ===
- All training institutes and schools listed above under the respective bases
- Air Technical Schools Command:
  - Aircraft Maintenance School
  - Electronics and Communication Systems School
  - Air Engineering School
  - Air Defense School
  - Supply & Administration School
  - Air Transportation School
  - Air Security School
  - Ammunition & Demolition School
  - Operational Preparedness and Officer Development School
  - Education Administrators and Teachers School

== Equipment ==
=== Aircraft ===
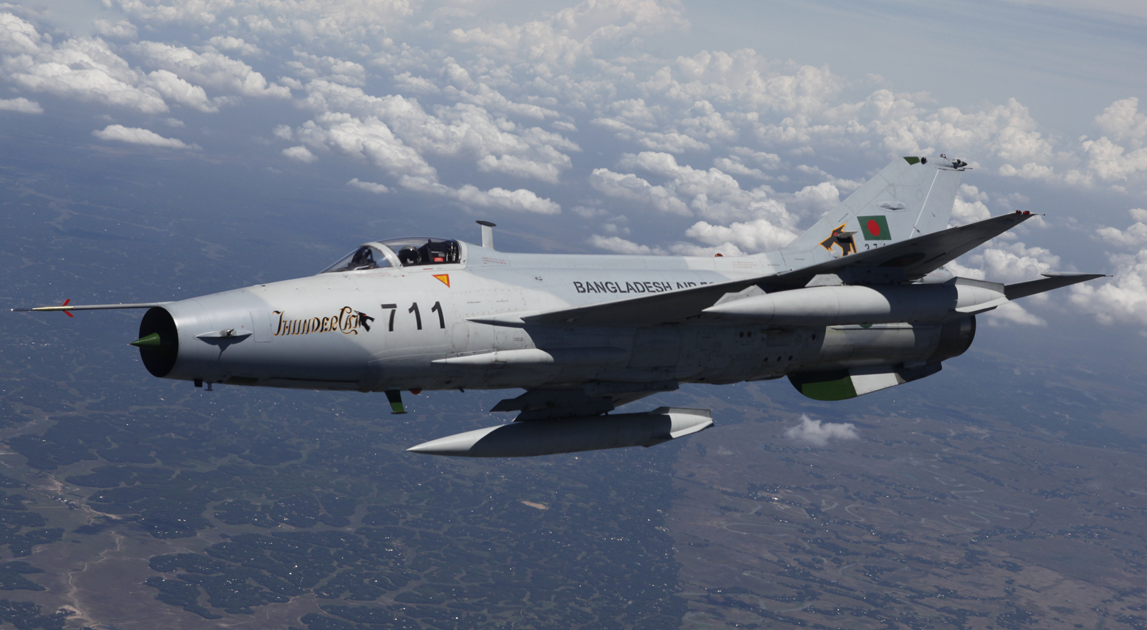
A Bangladesh Air Force Chengdu F-7BG1.

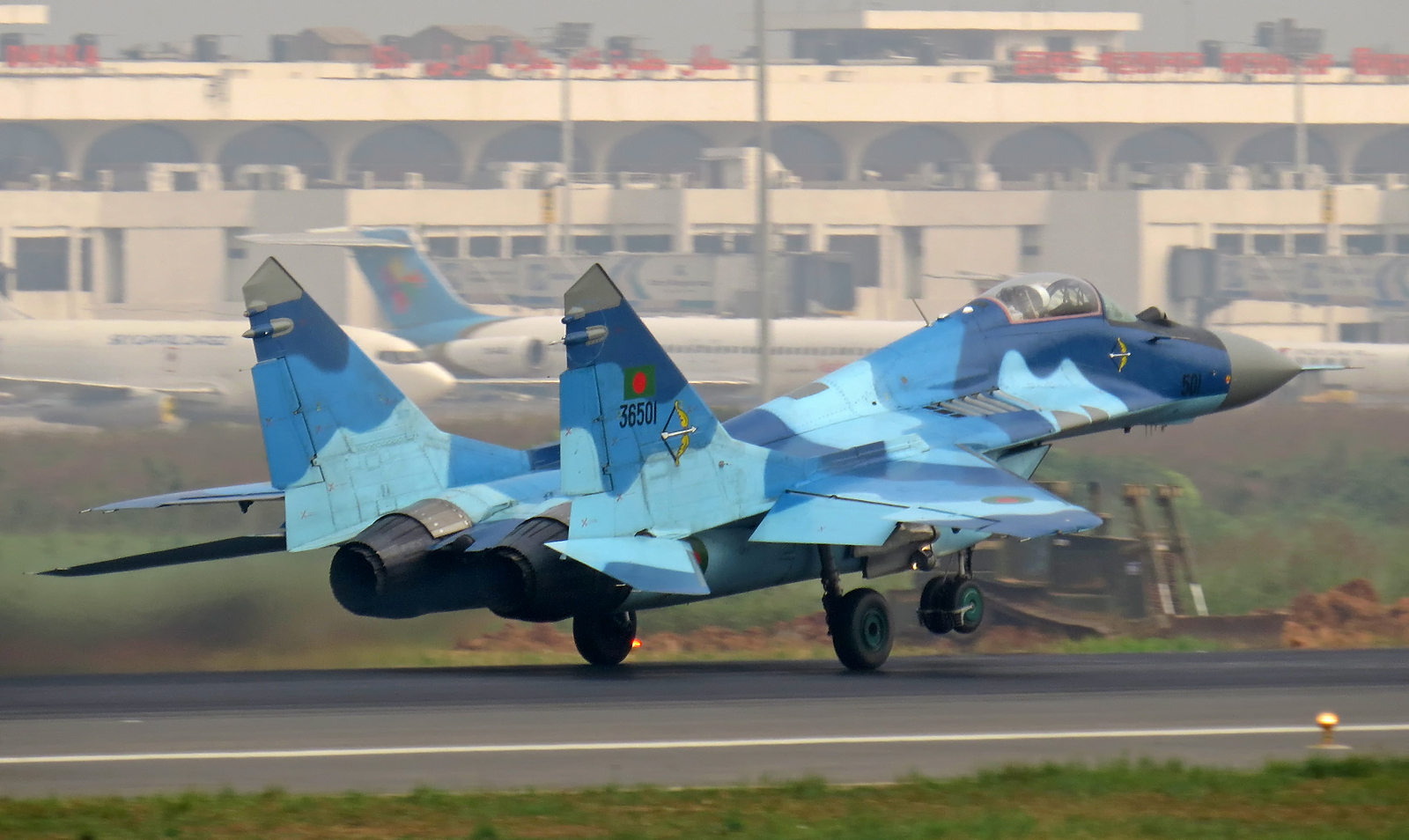
A Bangladesh Air Force MiG-29B taking off

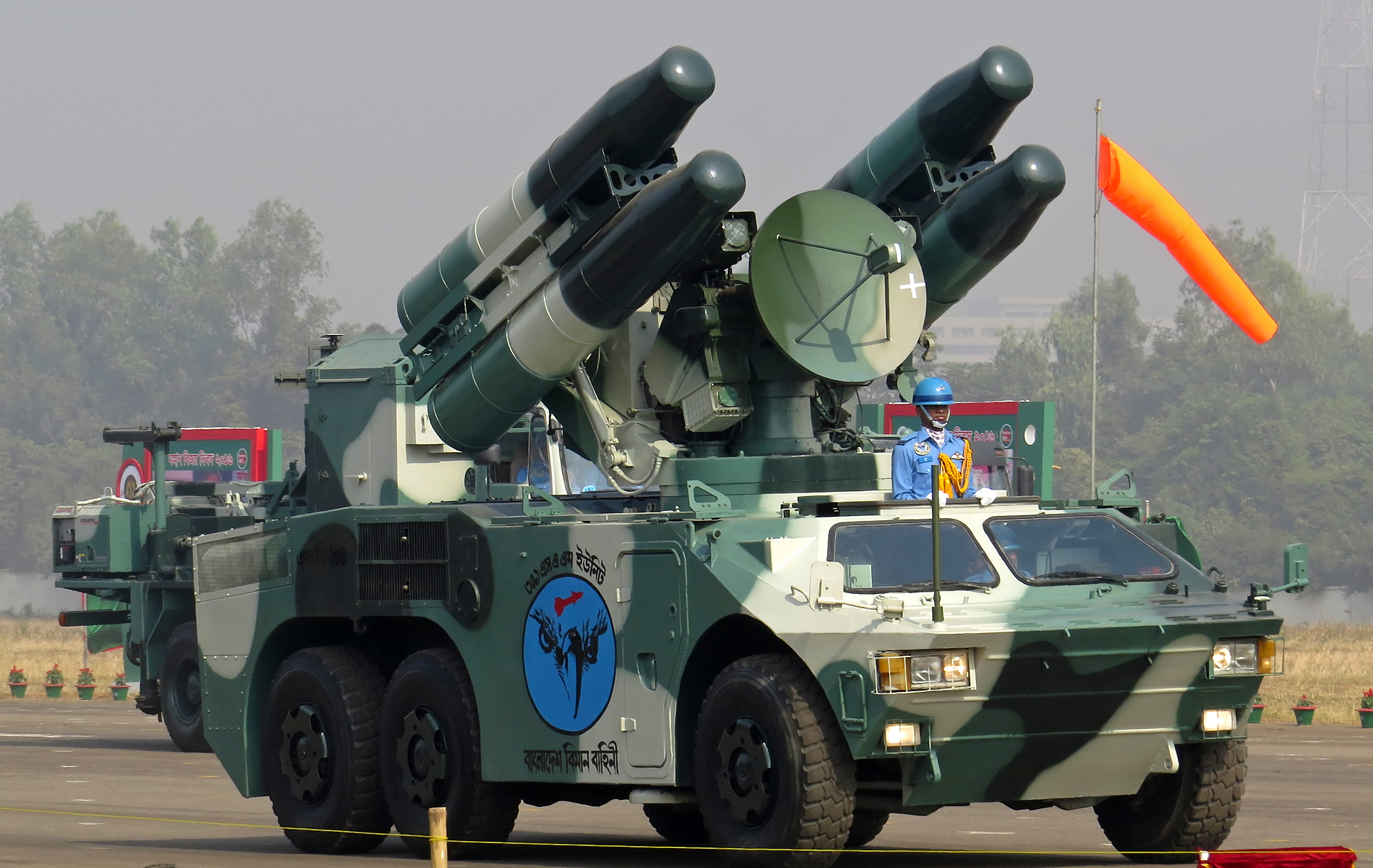
A Bangladesh Air Force FM-90 short-range SAM

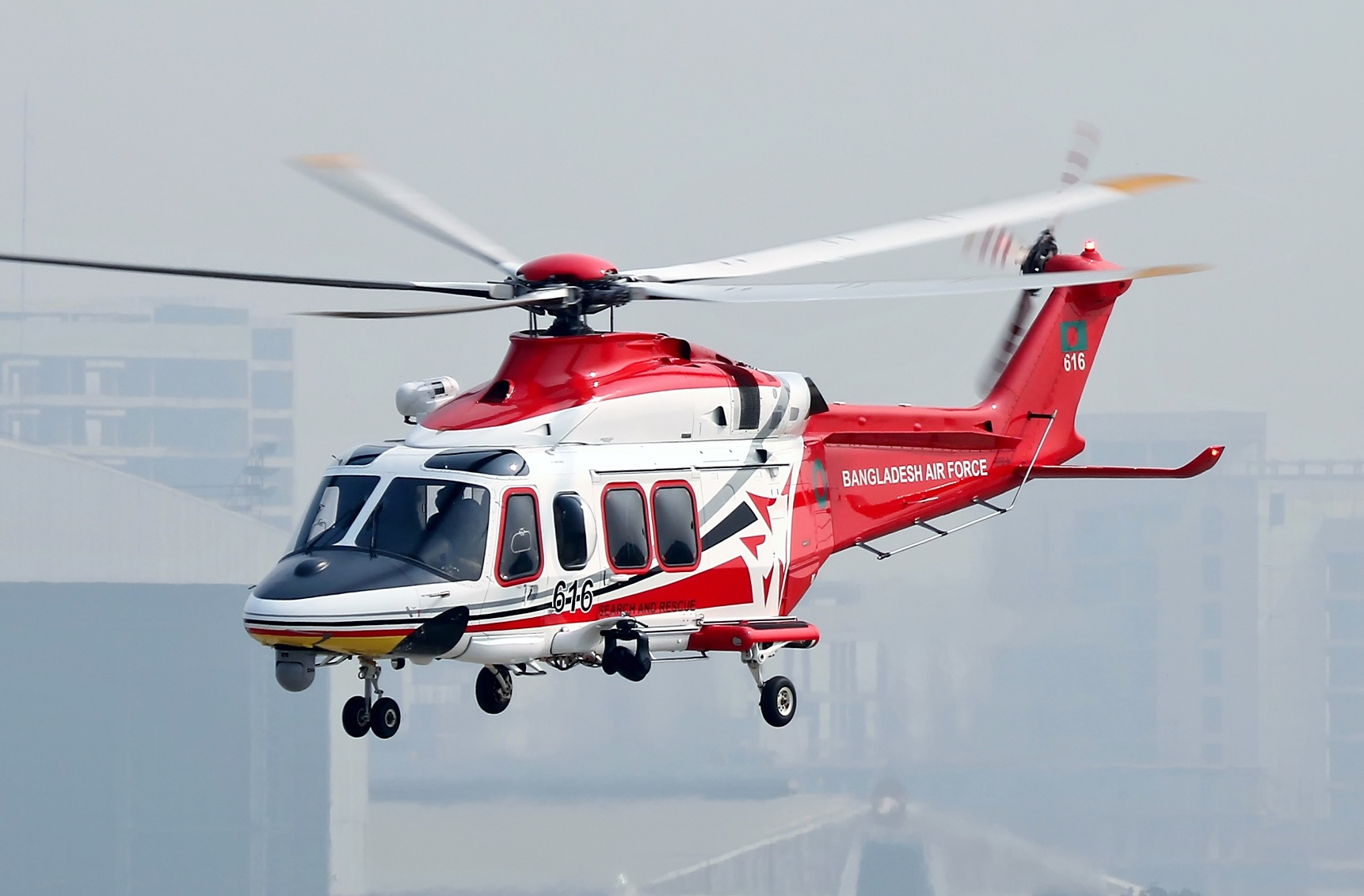
AW139 maritime search and rescue helicopter

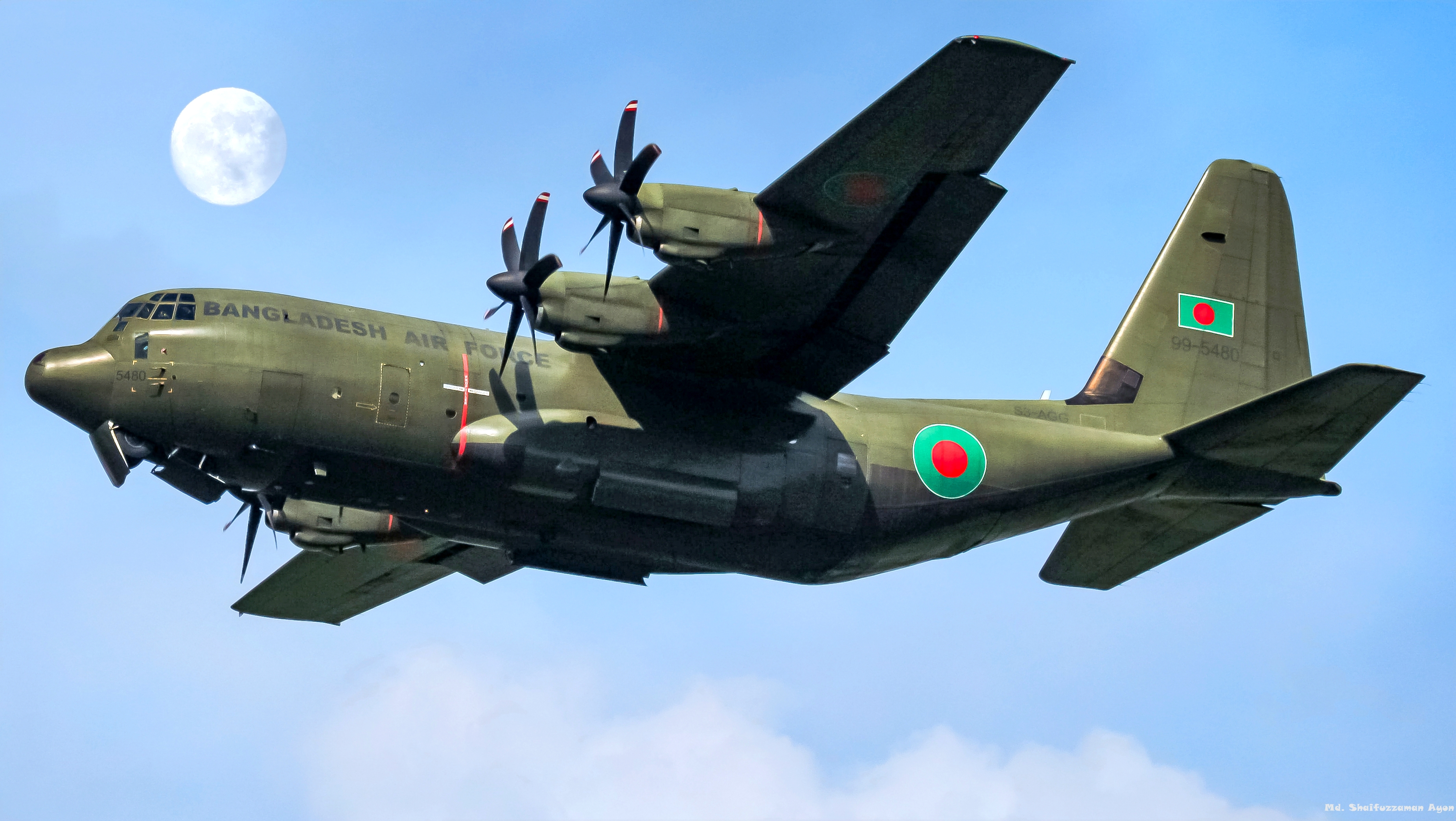
C-130J Super Hercules

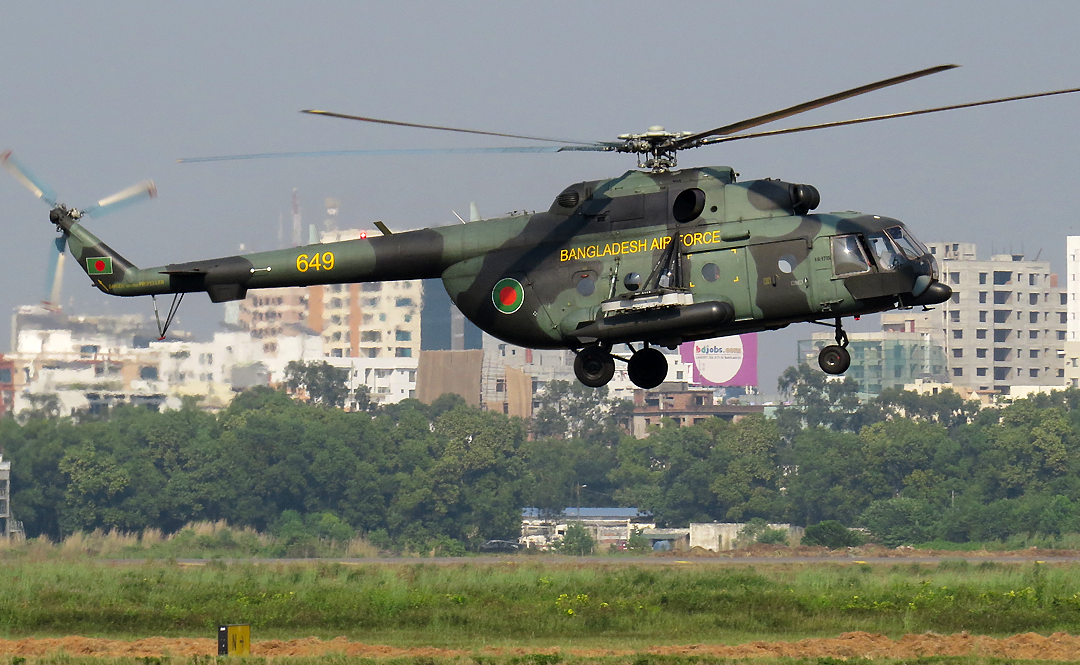
Mi-171Sh

Aircraft	Origin	Type	Variant	In service	Notes
Fighters
Chengdu F-7	China	Fighter, Interceptor/Multirole Combat Aircraft/Fighter Jet Conversion Trainer(FT-7s)	F/FT-7A/B/BG/BG1	32	
MiG-29	Russia	Air Superiority Fighter/Multirole Combat Aircraft/Maritime Strike Aircraft/Fighter Jet Conversion Trainer(UB/UBM)	B/BM/UB/UBM	8	
Transports
C-130J Super Hercules	United States	Tactical airlifter		5	
C-130 Hercules	United States	Transport	C-130B	3	
Antonov An-32	Ukraine	Transport/Bomber		3	Sometimes used as Bomber Aircraft.
L-410 Turbolet	Czech Republic	Transport/Trainer Aircraft		3	
Helicopters
Mil Mi-17	Russia	Utility/Armed Assault Helicopter	Mi-17/171,Mi-171Sh	35	Sometimes the Sh variants are used to provide CAS with loadouts typically being forward mounted gun, back door gun, door guns, gun pods and rocket pods mounts under it's 6 pylons.
Bell 212	United States	Utility/Armed Assault Helicopter		14	Used to do CAS before with door guns and 2x gunpods mount under it's 2 pylons. Unsure about how many are active as of now.
AgustaWestland AW139	Italy	SAR/Utility		4	
T129 ATAK	Turkey	Attack helicopter			6 On order, delivery from 2027.
Trainer aircraft
Grob G 115	Germany	Basic trainer	G-115BD	2	
Grob G 120TP	Germany	Basic trainer		23	
Nanchang PT-6	China	Basic trainer		9	Unknown number of active airframes actually. Could be more or less.
Hongdu JL-8	China / Pakistan	Jet trainer/Light Attack Aircraft	K-8W	14	Is used for CAS sometimes.
Yakovlev Yak-130	Russia	Jet trainer/Light Attack Aircraft		12	Used as dedicated Attack Aircraft.
Bell 206	United States	Rotorcraft trainer	206L	6	
AgustaWestland AW119	Italy	Rotorcraft trainer		2	
UAVs
Selex ES Falco	Italy	Reconnaissance/Ground Attack		4	Used for United Nations peacekeeping operations whilst abroad.

=== Ordnance ===
Name	Origin	Type	Notes
Air-to-air missiles
R-27R1/T1	Ukraine	Beyond-visual-range missile	
R-73E	Russia	Short-range IR air-to-air missile	
PL-5EII	China	Short-range IR air-to-air missile	
PL-9C	China	Short-range IR air-to-air missile	
PL-7	China	Short-range IR air-to-air missile	
Aerial bombs
Mark 81	United States	General-purpose bomb	
KAB-500KR	Russia	TV Guided Bomb	
LS-6	China	GPS Guided Bomb	LS-6 250 and 500 variants. Also there are chances of IR and Laser Guided ones being in service.
Teber-81	Turkey	Laser Guided Bomb	High chance of Teber-82 being in service too.
Aerial rockets
S-8	Russia	Air-Launched Rocket	
S-13	Russia	Air-Launched Rocket	
Anti-surfaces
Roketsan Cirit	Turkey	Air-to-surface missile, anti-armor and anti-personnel missile	Used on Selex ES Falco
MAM-L	Turkey	Air-to-surface missile	
Anti-ships
Kh-31	Russia	Anti-ship missile	used by MiG-29BM and MiG-29UBM.

=== Radars ===
Name	Origin	Type	Notes
GM 403M	France	3D AESA air search radar	2 systems deployed in Dhaka and Bogura.
Selex RAT-31DL	Italy	3D Solid state phased array air search radar	1 fixed installation in Barisal.
KRONOS LAND	Italy	AESA multifunctional radar	1 mobile system.
JH-16	China	Air search radar	
JY-11B	China	3D air search radar	
YLC-6	China	2D air search radar	At least 1 mobile system deployed in Cox's Bazar.
Plessey AR15	United Kingdom	Air search radar	
RL-64I	Czech Republic	S-Band Airport surveillance radar (ASH)	
RP-5GI	Czech Republic	Precision approach radar (PAR)	
1L-117	Russia	3D Air Search Radar	2 (status uncertain).
AN/TPS-43	United States	3D Air Search Radar	4 (status uncertain).

== Current modernisation effort ==
The BAF has an ongoing modernisation programme, Forces Goal 2030. To perform its increasing duties and responsibilities, the air force is being divided into two separate commands: Southern and Northern. A new airbase is being set up under Southern Command at Barishal with an emphasis on maritime security. Another airbase is under construction at Sylhet.

=== Establishment of UAV manufacturing and assembly plant ===
On 27 January 2026, the Bangladesh Air Force signed a government-to-government (G2G) agreement with the Chinese state-owned company China Electronics Technology Group Corporation (CETC) International to establish a domestic Unmanned Aerial Vehicle (UAV) manufacturing and assembly plant. The deal, signed at the Air Force Headquarters in Dhaka Cantonment, includes a comprehensive technology transfer (ToT) component aimed at enhancing Bangladesh's indigenous defence production capabilities.

Under the terms of the agreement, the two parties will jointly establish a manufacturing facility to produce and assemble various categories of drones, including Medium Altitude Low Endurance (MALE) UAVs and Vertical Take-off and Landing (VTOL) platforms. The project is designed to reduce the Bangladesh Armed Forces' long-term reliance on imports for unmanned systems. In addition to meeting military requirements for surveillance and defence, the locally produced UAVs are also intended for civilian roles such as humanitarian assistance and disaster response.

=== Delays in multi-role combat aircraft procurement ===
On 2 March 2017, the Sheikh Hasina-led government floated a closed tender for eight fighters. The tender issued by the Directorate General of Defence Purchase (DGDP) was controversial from the beginning, as the opposition Bangladesh Nationalist Party accused the governing Awami League of using Indian funding to buy obsolete aircraft from Russia. The MiG-35 was one of the contenders, along with the Sukhoi Su-30 fighter with European-origin AESA radar. The Bangladesh government allocated almost $400 million for the procurement. Russia has negotiated with Bangladesh for a year for the sale of MiG-35. The Bangladesh government has terminated the tender due to a funding shortage, and for the Su-30 order placement by the Myanmar Air Force in 2018. Italian Elettronica SPA is also unable to work with any Russian company to fulfill Bangladesh's requirements due to international sanctions on Russia. In the third Bangladesh-UK strategic dialogue held in May 2019, the two countries desired to further strengthen the defence ties between them. The United Kingdom expressed its readiness to support Bangladesh with the procurement of high-calibre multi-role combat aircraft alongside other modernisation programmes.

In January 2020, Anisul Huq, the previous minister responsible for defence affairs in the parliament at that time, told the parliament that the process is ongoing to procure 16 multirole combat aircraft, eight attack helicopters, three VVIP helicopters, two air defence radar units, 24 primary trainer aircraft, two light aircraft, one K-8W simulator, four MRAP vehicles, one AW-119 simulator, two counter drone surveillance radar systems, and one mobile ATC tower, and a life extension and upgrade of its MiG-29 aircraft. In 2021, the Bangladesh Air Force requested the Bangladesh Government to earmark around 25,200-crore taka (2.5 billion euros) for 16 Western-origin multirole fighter jets. In order to sign the agreement and for the first installment council, the Bangladesh Air Force requested the allocation of 6,300-crore taka for the 2021–22 financial year. In 2021, Eurofighter World Magazine reported Bangladesh as a potential customer for the Eurofighter Typhoon. However, even after the announcement, the previous government did not order multirole combat aircraft or attack helicopters in the next three years. The government collapsed, and Sheikh Hasina fled to India on 5 August 2024 due to the July Revolution in Bangladesh.

On 28 October 2024, Bangladesh's new interim government's Chief Adviser Muhammad Yunus's press wing clarified that no deal with France for Dassault Rafale fighters had been signed yet and there was no official request from France yet to revive the negotiations that stopped after the 2019 COVID-19 pandemic. No formal attempt has been made since then to review the arrangement. At the end of 2024, it is reported that China's Chengdu J-10 fighters are reportedly being considered to order by the Bangladesh government to replace the Bangladesh Air Force's aging fighter aircraft. On January 15, 2025, a high-level defense delegation from Bangladesh visited Pakistan. On the visit, Bangladesh also showed interest in acquiring the JF-17 Block 3. After showing interest, the new interim government also stopped commenting about the procurement of any multirole fighter aircraft. Bangladeshi media reports accuse Indian pressure and Indian RAW agents inside the Bangladesh military and government bureaucracy as the reason behind the long delays in the procurement of the multirole fighter aircraft. News media reports mentioned that the Bangladesh Air Force is now planning to purchase 20 Chengdu J-10CE, 10 Eurofighter Typhoon Tranche 3, and 16 JF-17 Block 3 fighters. On 9 December 2025, they signed a letter of intent (LOI) with Leonardo S.p.a for the purchase of an unknown number of Eurofighter Typhoons. The Bangladesh Air Force did not confirm the procurement of any models yet. In 2026, the air force chief went to Pakistan to talk about the procurement of JF-17. He later said that the air force will build a new air base in Bogra, where new fighter jets will be assigned. According to a new media report, the newly elected Bangladesh Nationalist Party-led Bangladesh government is in negotiations with China to sign a deal to buy 24 J-10CE multirole fighter aircraft.

=== Delays in attack helicopter procurement ===
In October 2019, US officials said Bangladesh requested to purchase advanced military equipment from the United States, including multi-role combat fighters, attack helicopters, and surface-to-air missile systems. The US offered the Bangladesh Air Force two types of attack helicopters, and the BAF opted for the AH-64 Apache. In January 2020, Boeing confirmed that the AH-64E attack helicopter was down-selected by the BAF after a competitive bidding process. Any purchase of AH-64 Apache helicopters depends on Bangladesh and the United States signing Acquisition and Cross-Servicing Agreement (ACSA) and General Security of Military Information Agreement (GSOMIA) agreements. However, in late December 2021, it was reported that Bangladesh was now finalizing a government-to-government (G2G) deal with Russia to buy 8 Mi-28NEs with the necessary equipment, along with operations and maintenance training. New media reports mentioned that the Bangladesh Air Force is now planning to purchase 6 T129 ATAK attack helicopters from Turkey. A deal worth $600 million is now in process.

=== Modern radar procurement ===
On 29 October 2019, the Italian company Leonardo announced that it secured a contract to supply Kronos Land 3D AESA radar systems to the Bangladesh Air Force to provide air surveillance and detect and track targets in tactical environments. The number of radars ordered was not disclosed.

=== Trainer aircraft procurement ===
In June 2021, the Bangladesh Air Force revealed an order for 24 Grob G 120TP trainer aircraft. According to Masihuzzaman Serniabat, the previous COAS, the Bangladesh Air Force ordered 24 trainer aircraft from Grob. Under the deal, Grob Aircraft will also install a composite material (fiberglass-reinforced plastic and carbon fibre composites) repair workshop and a propeller repair workshop in Bangladesh.

=== Transport aircraft procurement ===
Five ex-RAF 'short-bodied' C-130Js were ordered in two batches in 2018 and 2019 to replace Bangladesh's aging, second-hand C-130Bs. The first aircraft was delivered in August 2019. They will be used to transport troops and equipment both home and abroad, as well as provide humanitarian assistance and support UN peacekeeping missions. The fourth aircraft landed at the Dhaka Airbase in Dhaka on 20 February 2023.

== Accidents ==
- 7 January 2001: Squadron Leader Mohammad Mohsin died when a Chengdu J-7 trainer jet crashed after a takeoff at 1:35 p.m. from the Hazrat Shahjalal International Airport. Due to some malfunctions of the aircraft, the pilot could not manage to eject from the aircraft, but the other pilot, Squadron Leader Reza Emdad Khan, could manage to eject, bringing some injuries.
- 8 April 2008: Squadron leader Morshed Hasan died when a Chengdu F-7 crashed in Ghatail Upazila of Tangail. The pilot ejected from the aircraft but was critically injured when its parachute malfunctioned. He died at Combined Military Hospital (CMH) in Dhaka after he had been rescued.
- 20 December 2010: Squadron leaders Ashraf Ibne Ahmed and Mahmudul Haque were killed when two Bangladesh Air Force PT-6 aircraft crashed near Barishal Airport.
- 8 April 2012: A pilot officer, Shariful Haque, died, and a squadron leader, Muhammad Mamunur Rashid, was injured when an Aero L-39 training aircraft crashed in Madhupur Upazila of Tangail.
- 26 April 2012: A Bangladesh Air Force PT-6 aircraft on a training mission crash-landed in West Bengal, India. Trainee pilot Rashed Sheikh escaped the aircraft safely with minor injuries. India arranged a safe return of the pilot to Bangladesh.
- 13 May 2015: A Mi-17 helicopter on a training flight belonging to the Bangladesh Air Force crash-landed at the airport and caught fire. All three people on board sustained major injuries and were hospitalized.
- 29 June 2015: Flight Lieutenant Tahmid went missing when his F-7MB crashed into the Bay of Bengal. The aircraft took off around 10:27 am from Johurul Haque air base, lost contact with the control room around 11:10 am, and later crashed in the Bay of Bengal in Patenga around 11:30 am.
- 11 July 2017: A Yak-130 'Mitten' training aircraft crashed at Lohagara in Bangladesh's southeastern Chittagong District. Two pilots were unharmed.
- 27 December 2017: Two Yak-130 aircraft crashed at Maheshkhali Island in Cox's Bazar due to a mid-air collision. The official report states that the accident happened during the breaking of formation at a training exercise. All four pilots of two aircraft were rescued alive.
- 3 January 2018: 1 Mi-17 helicopter crashed in Sreemangal whilst carrying Kuwaiti delegates. Everyone was rescued alive.
- 1 July 2018: Squadron Leader Md Serajul Islam and Squadron Leader Enayet Kabir Polash were killed when their K-8W trainer aircraft crashed at Bookbhora oxbow lake near Jessore Airport on a night training mission.
- 23 November 2018: Wing Commander Arif Ahmed Dipu died when his F-7BG crashed in Tangail's Madhupur upazila on a training mission. The fuel tank of the aircraft reportedly caught fire after it used weaponry in the sky, leading the pilot to eject at low altitude. The pilot was later found dead, and parts of the plane were seen scattered.
- 9 May 2024: A Yak-130 training fighter plane of the Bangladesh Air Force crashed in Chattogram's Patenga due to pilot error. One of the two pilots was injured, and Squadron Leader Asim Jawwad died. Bangladeshi officials attributed the crash to a possible mechanical failure. The Ministry of Defence sent five officers into forced retirement for unsafe flying practices involving Yak-130 training aircraft.
- 21 July 2025: A twin-seat FT-7BGI variant of the Chengdu J-7 fighter, tail number 701, crashed in Uttara, Dhaka, Bangladesh, impacting the campus of Milestone School & College. At least 35 people, including the pilot, were killed, while 171 others were injured. Bangladesh's interim government established an independent investigation team, which found that the pilot's error, resulting from poor training, was the primary cause of the crash.

== See also ==
- Bangladesh Army
- Bangladesh Navy
- Bangladesh Aeronautical Centre
- List of historic Bangladesh military aircraft
- Bangladesh Ansar
- Ministry of Defence
- Bangladesh Armed Forces
- Bangladesh Naval Aviation
- Bangladesh Air Force football team
