= National Institute of Burn and Plastic Surgery =

Burn & Plastic Surgery Institute in Dhaka, Bangladesh

National Institute of Burn and Plastic Surgery, Dhaka

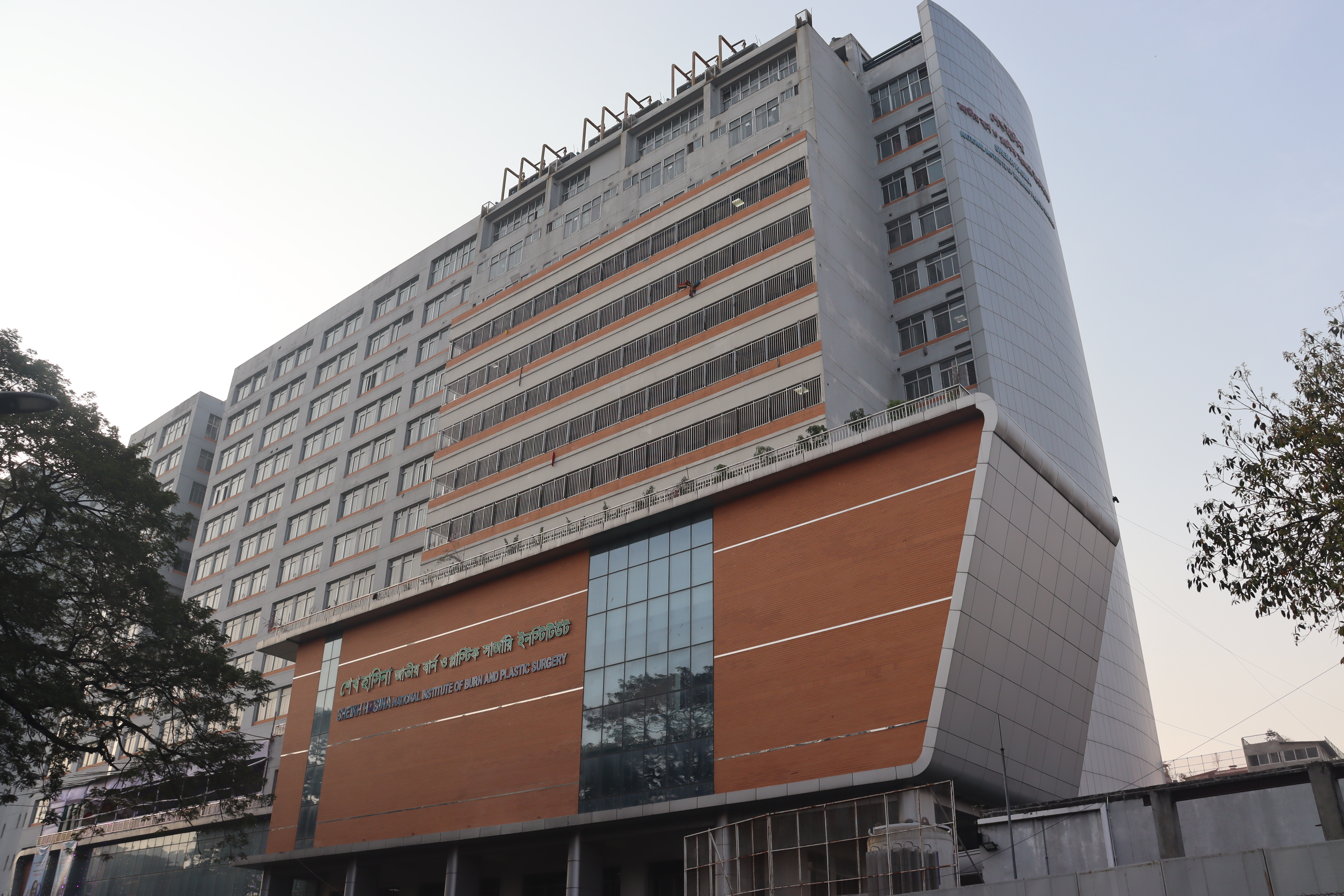

Geography
- Location: 63, AHM Kamruzzaman Sharani, Chankharpul, Dhaka, Bangladesh

Organisation
- Type: Specialised hospital

Services
- Beds: 500

History
- Former names: Sheikh Hasina National Institute of Burn and Plastic Surgery (2019–2024)
- Constructed: April, 2016
- Opened: July 4, 2019

Links
- Website: nibps.org

The National Institute of Burn and Plastic Surgery (Bengali: জাতীয় বার্ন ও প্লাস্টিক সার্জারি ইনস্টিটিউট, romanized: Jātīẏô Bārn Ō Plāsṭik Sārjāri Insṭiṭiuṭ) is a hospital dedicated to burn and plastic surgery in Dhaka, Bangladesh. It is regarded as the largest burn and plastic surgical care center in the world.

== History ==
In 1986, the first burn unit was started in the country with six beds by the country's first plastic surgeon, Mohammad Shahidullah, in Dhaka Medical College and Hospital. The number of beds was increased to 50 in 2003 under supervision of Samanta Lal Sen. Later, the bed number was increased to 100. In 2013, the number of beds was increased to 300.

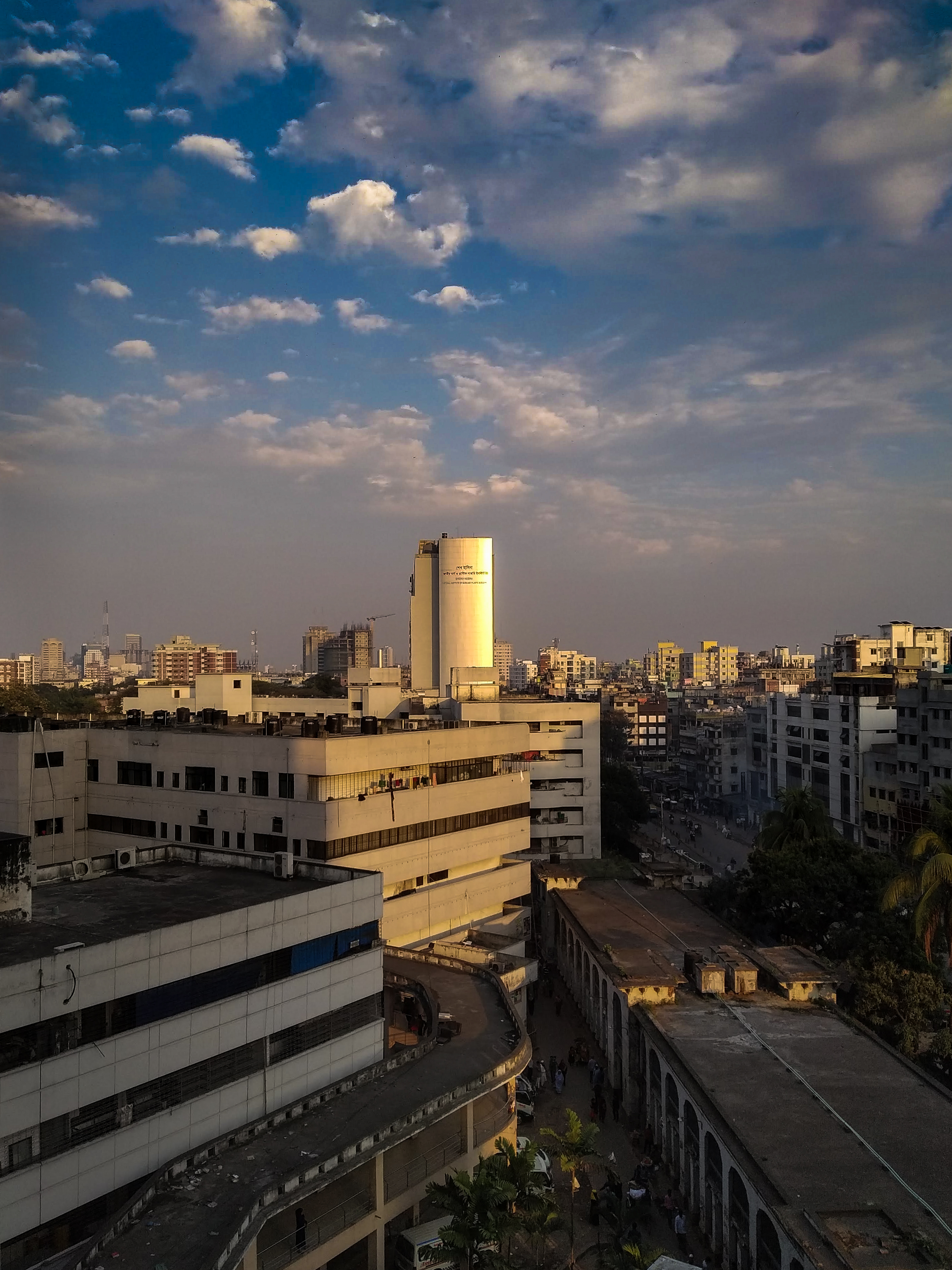
National Institute of Burn and Plastic Surgery

In November 2015, the Executive Committee of the National Economic Council (ECNEC) approved the project for establishment of the institute. On April 6, 2016, Prime Minister Sheikh Hasina laid the foundation stone for the institute. She also inaugurated the hospital on October 24, 2018. It formally started functioning from July 4, 2019.

The Sheikh Hasina National Institute of Burn and Plastic Surgery was renamed to National Institute of Burn and Plastic Surgery in November 2024 after the fall of Sheikh Hasina's government.

== Hospital structure ==
The hospital building is an 18-storey structure equipped with rooftop helipad and a ground parking facility for 180 vehicles. It has three blocks for three separate units - the burn unit, the plastic surgery unit and the academic wing. It was built at a cost of 912 crore bdt. The facility was constructed by Bangladesh Army's engineering core.

== Facilities ==
The institute has 500 beds, 22 ICU beds and 22 HDU facilities. It has 12 operation theatres with a postoperative unit.

== Management ==
Abul Kalam was appointed as the first director of the institute in March 2020. He was also the project director of this institute. Until becoming a minister, Samanta Lal Sen was the chief coordinator of the institute.

== Role in outbreaks ==
Beside its regular activities, the hospital facility was used during a dengue outbreak in 2019 as an extension unit of Dhaka Medical College Hospital to accommodate a large number of dengue patients.

In 2020, this hospital was used as a COVID-19 treatment center, in collaboration with Dhaka Medical College Hospital.
