= Milestone College =

Private institution in Dhaka, Bangladesh

Milestone School & College
- মাইলস্টোন স্কুল এন্ড কলেজ
- Logo of Milestone College

Location
- Main campus: 30 & 44 Gareeb-E-Newaz Avenue, Sector 11, Uttara Model Town; Permanent campus: Diabari, Turag, Uttara; Dhaka, 1230; Bangladesh; 23.8779°N 90.3684°E

Information
- Other name: MC
- Type: Private school and college
- Motto: Learn and Lead
- Established: 2002; 24 years ago
- Founder: Colonel Nurunnabi (Retd.)
- Trust: MNRS Trust
- School code: School Code- 1098; College Code- 1056; EIIN - 108572
- Principal: Mohammad Ziaul Alam
- Executive Principal (School section): Mrs. Rifat Alam
- Staff: 500+
- Faculty: 350+
- Grades: PG–XII
- Gender: Co-educational
- Enrolment: 10000
- Language: Bengali and English
- Campus size: 12.4 acres
- Campus type: Urban
- Yearbook: Onurono (অনুরণন); Unmilan (উন্মীলন)
- Affiliation: Board of Intermediate and Secondary Education, Dhaka
- Alumni name: Ex Milestonian
- Website: www.milestonecollege.edu.bd www.milestonecollege.com

Milestone School & College (Bengali: মাইলস্টোন স্কুল এন্ড কলেজ) is a Bengali and English-version, co-educational private school and college in Uttara, Dhaka, Bangladesh.

== History ==
It was founded by retired Colonel Nuran Nabi who was also the founding principal of RAJUK Uttara Model College. Milestone ranked tenth nationally in Higher Secondary Certificate (HSC) examination results in 2014.

=== Fighter jet crash in 2025 ===
On 21 July 2025, a FT-7BGI fighter jet trainer aircraft of the Bangladesh Air Force crashed into the college's campus, killing at least 35 people, including the pilot, and injuring 173 others.

== Academic Structure ==
Milestone College offers education at the lower secondary, secondary, and higher secondary levels under the National Curriculum. The lower secondary (Upto grade VIII) part of the institution is called Milestone Preparatory KG School. Afterwards, it is formally known as called Milestone College. The institution provides instruction in both Bengali and English.

=== Curriculum ===
Milestone College follows the National Curriculum of Bangladesh managed by the National Curriculum and Textbook Board. According to the guidelines of this curriculum, students in grades IX and XI are required to choose one of three academic streams—Science, Business Studies, or Humanities. Students select their preferred stream based on fulfillment of the prescribed academic requirements.

=== Campuses ===
As of 2026, the institution has 13 campuses:

==== In Uttara ====
1. Main Campus (Sector 11)
2. Permanent Campus (Diabari)
3. English Version Senior Section (Sector 11)
4. English Version Junior Section (Sector 07)
5. Sector- 04 Campus
6. Sector- 13 Campus
7. Sector- 14 Campus

==== In larger Dhaka city ====
1. Mowshair Campus (Dakshinkhan)
2. Mohammadpur Campus
3. Khilket Campus
4. Aftabnagar Campus
5. Nobodoy Campus

==== Outside Dhaka ====
1. Gazipur Campus
