= M. Sayed Hossain =

Bangladesh Air Force officer

Muhammad Sayed Hossain
- Military career
- Allegiance: Bangladesh
- Branch: Bangladesh Air Force
- Service years: 1984 - 2023
- Rank: Air Vice Marshal
- Unit: No. 25 Squadron
- Commands: ACAS (Administration) at Air Headquarters; AOC of BAF Base Bangabandhu; AOC of BAF Base Paharkanchanpur; FSR of BAF Base Bangabandhu; Director (Training) at Air Headquarters; Commandant of Command and Staff Training Institute

Muhammad Sayed Hossain OSP, BSP. GUP, ndc, psc is a retired air officer of Bangladesh Air Force and former assistant chief of air staff (administration). He was air officer commanding (AOC) of Bangladesh Air Force Base Bangabandhu.

== Career ==
Hossain served as BAF director of air training, Air Headquarters before he was promoted to air vice marshal. He was promoted to air vice marshal in 2018.
