= List of serving marshals of the Bangladesh Air Force =

Ensign of Bangladesh Air Force

This list represents the serving air officers of Bangladesh Air Force. Currently the air force has 1 air chief marshal with 16 air vice marshals. Formerly, the air marshal upheld the assignments as chief of air staff. However as of 2025, there is no air marshal posts formed immediately.

== Air chief marshals ==
Name	Post	References
Hasan Mahmood Khan	Chief of Air Staff	

== Air marshals ==
(No apportion)

== Air vice marshals ==
Name	Post	References
Rushad Din Asad	Assistant Chief of Air Staff (Operations)	
rafiul haque	Air Officer Commanding, Air Operation Center	
Javed Tanveer Khan	Assistant Chief of Air Staff (Plans)	
Khair Ul Afsar	Assistant Chief of Air Staff (Administration)	
Muhammad Tariqul Islam	Assistant Chief of Air (Maintenance)	
Haider Abdullah	Air Officer Commanding, BAF Base A. K. Khandker	
Syed Sayedur Rahman	Air Officer Commanding, BAF Base Bashar	
Shariful Islam	Air Officer Commanding, BAF Base Cox's Bazar	
A. F. M. Shamimul Islam	Air Officer Commanding, BAF Base Matiur Rahman	
Shafiqul Islam	Senior Directing Staff (Air), National Defense College	
Abdullah Al Mamun	Air Officer Commanding, BAF Base Zahurul Haq	
Mohammad Mostafa Mahmood Siddiq	Chairman, Civil Aviation Authority, Bangladesh	
M. Mustafizur Rahman	Vice Chancellor, Aviation and Aerospace University, Bangladesh	
Sitwat Nayeem	Ambassador of Bangladesh to Ethiopia	
A. K. M. Shafiul Azam	Ambassador, Ministry of Foreign Affairs	
Mahmud Mehedi Hussain	Air Secretary	
Asadul Karim	Commandant, Air Training and Doctrine Command	

== See also ==
- List of serving generals of the Bangladesh Army
- List of serving admirals of the Bangladesh Navy
