= Hasan Mahmood Khan =

Chief of Air Staff of the Bangladesh Air Force

Air Chief Marshal Hasan Mahmood Khan BBP, OSP, GUP
- হাসান মাহমুদ খাঁন
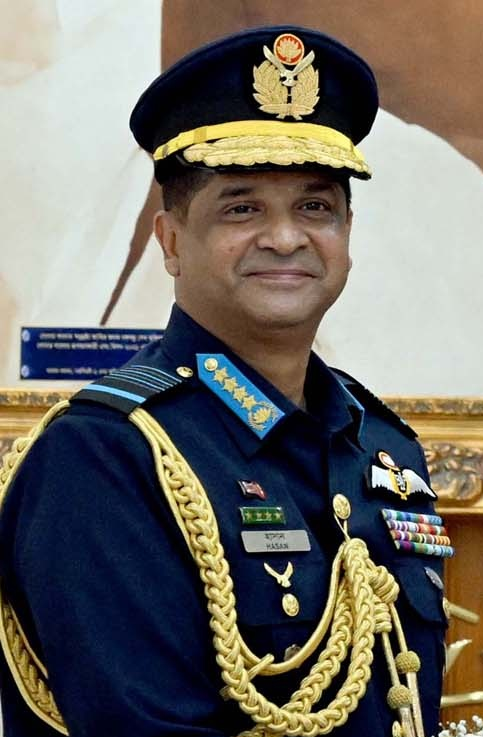
- Khan in 2024

17th Chief of Air Staff
- Incumbent
- Assumed office 11 June 2024
- President: Mohammed Shahabuddin; Hafiz Uddin Ahmad (acting); Mirza Fakrul Islam Alamgir
- Prime Minister: Sheikh Hasina; Muhammad Yunus (acting); Tarique Rahman
- Preceded by: Shaikh Abdul Hannan

Personal details
- Born: 20 June 1966 (age 60) Dacca, East Pakistan, Pakistan
- Spouse: Saleha Khan
- Children: 2
- Education: Bangladesh Air Force Academy

Military service
- Allegiance: Bangladesh
- Branch/service: Bangladesh Air Force
- Years of service: 1985–present
- Rank: Air Chief Marshal
- Unit: No. 35 Squadron BAF
- Commands: ACAS(Planning) of Air Headquarters; AOC of BAF Base Cox's Bazar; AOC of BAF Base Bir Uttom A. K. Khandker; Commandant of ATI

Hasan Mahmood Khan BBP, OSP, GUP, nswc, psc (born 20 June 1966) is a four-star air officer and the current chief of air staff of the Bangladesh Air Force. Prior to that, he served as assistant chief of air staff (planning). Before that, he served as air officer commanding (AOC) of BAF Base Bir Uttom A. K. Khandker.

== Career ==
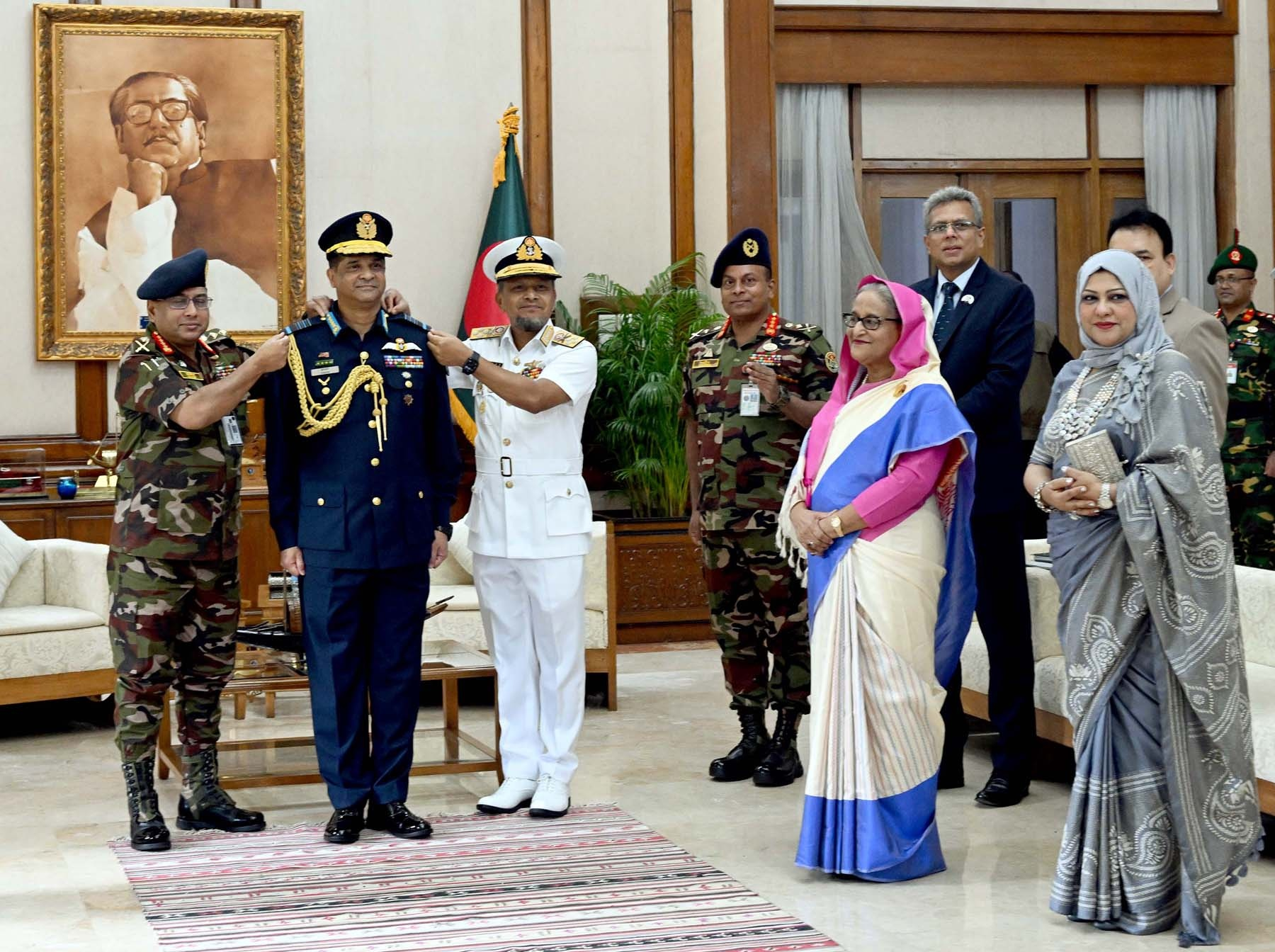
Khan receives the four star rank badge

Khan served as officer commanding of Airmen Training Institute from 9 July 2008 to 24 March 2009. He also served as Bangladesh Air Force plans director while he was air commodore. He was commissioned in the Bangladesh Air Force on June 15, 1986 in the general duties (pilot) branch. He is a fighter pilot and an active flyer, having logged 2396:05 flying hours to his credit. The air officer is one of the pioneer members who inducted Mig-29 ac in BAF. He is a category "A" qualified flying instructor and has received 'Flying Efficiency Badge". He is also a category "A" ops pilot. Khan has served in various command and staff appointment such as officer commanding 8 Squadron, officer commanding Training Wing, officer commanding Flying Wing, Bangladesh Air Force Base Bangabandhu, base commander Bangladesh Air Force Base Zahurul Haque, director of air operations, chief inspector, director of plans, director of air intelligence at Air Headquarters, deputy commandant and chief instructor of Bangladesh Air Force Academy, air officer commanding Bangladesh Air Force Base Cox's Bazar, deputy commandant of Defence Service Command and Staff College Mirpur and air officer commanding of Bangladesh Air Force Base Bangabandhu. He has also served as assistant chief of air staff (plans) at Air Headquarters.

The air officer has attended various professional courses at home and abroad including flying instructors' course, junior command and staff course, physiological indoctrination course, jungle survival course, watermanship course, flight safety course and defence service command and staff course. He attended PIC and High-G test in Turkey, MIG-29 training in Russia, staff course in China, MiG-29 simulator training in Malaysia and national security and war course in Pakistan. Khan obtained a Master's in Defence Studies from Defence Services Command and Staff College, Mirpur as well as from National Defence University in Pakistan. He has served as a military observer in Sierra Leone and second-in-command in DR Congo. For his extra ordinary contribution and outstanding service to Bangladesh Air Force, he has been awarded peacetime medals "Biman Bahini Padak" (BBP), "Gourobuzzal Uddoyon Padak" (GUP) and "Oshamanya Sheba Padak" (OSP).

=== Chief of air staff ===
On 11 June 2024, Khan was promoted to Air chief marshal and made the chief of air staff.

During the July Revolution, Khan vehemently refused to use attack helicopters on protestors. Khan, along with the other service chiefs, helped secure Sheikh Hasina's resignation.

After a Chengdu J-7BG1 jet crashed into a school in Dhaka, he declared that the air force would provide proper treatment to those injured in the crash.

He went to Pakistan to talk about the procurement of jets for the air force, notably JF-17. In 2026, he stated that an air base will be built in Bogra and new jets will be assigned there.

== Personal life ==
Khan and his wife Saleha Khan have two children, a daughter and a son.

Military offices
Preceded by Air chief marshal Shaikh Abdul Hannan	Chief of Air Staff; 11 June 2024	Incumbent
