= Air chief marshal =

High ranking officer in an air force

Air chief marshal (Air Chf Mshl or ACM) is a high-ranking air officer rank used by some air forces, with origins from the Royal Air Force. The rank is used by air forces of many countries that have historical British influence. This rank is also equivalent to an admiral in a navy or a full general in an army or other nations' air forces.

The rank of air chief marshal is immediately senior to the rank of air marshal but subordinate to marshal of the air force. Air chief marshals are sometimes generically considered to be air marshals.

== Australia ==
In the Royal Australian Air Force, this rank is only used when the Chief of the Defence Force is an Air Force officer. When this is not the case, the senior ranking Air Force officer is the Chief of Air Force, holding the rank of air marshal.

With the establishment of the Australian Air Board on 9 November 1920, Australian Air Corps officers dropped their army ranks in favour of those based on the Royal Air Force. However, it was not until 1965 when Sir Frederick Scherger became Chairman of the Australian Chiefs of Staff Committee, and was promoted to air chief marshal that an RAAF officer attained the rank. Throughout the history of the RAAF, only four of its officers have held the rank. Apart from Scherger, they are Sir Neville McNamara (promoted 1982), Sir Angus Houston (promoted 2005) and Mark Binskin (promoted 2014). McNamara, Houston and Binskin are former Australian Defence Force chiefs; as of November 2024, Admiral David Johnston is the current chief of the Australian Defence Force.

== Bangladesh ==
In 2016 the Bangladeshi Chief of Air Staff position was upgraded from air marshal to air chief marshal rank. Since then the rank has been held by Abu Esrar, Masihuzzaman Serniabat, Shaikh Abdul Hannan, and Hasan Mahmood Khan.

== Canada ==
Throughout the 20th century history of the Royal Canadian Air Force, only two officers held the rank of air chief marshal. They were: Lloyd Samuel Breadner (promoted 1945) and Frank Robert Miller (promoted 1961). The rank existed on paper until the 1968 unification of the Canadian Forces, when Army-type rank titles were adopted and the rank of air chief marshal was replaced by that of full general. As no serving officers held the rank in 1968, no Canadian air chief marshals were regraded to general and Miller, the then only living retired air chief marshal, retained his rank. When Miller died in 1997 the Canadian rank of air chief marshal effectively passed into history. The 21st century re-creation of the Royal Canadian Air Force did not seen the rank revived. Army-style rank titles continue to be used although a return to the former insignia was enacted. In official Canadian French usage, the rank title was maréchal en chef de l'air.

== India ==
In the Indian Air Force, the Chief of Air Staff (CAS) (currently ACM Amar Preet Singh) holds the rank of Air Chief Marshal. The position of the CAS was upgraded from Air Marshal to Air Chief Marshal in 1966. The first IAF officer to hold this rank was Air Chief Marshal Arjan Singh (later promoted to the five-star rank of Marshal of the Indian Air Force) who was promoted to the rank in 1966 while he served as the CAS. Post 1966, all the Indian air chiefs have held the rank. As of 2014, 19 Indian chiefs of the air staff have held the rank. In the Indian Air Force the honorary promotion of Arjan Singh to marshal of the Indian Air Force in 2002 resulted in Indian air chief marshals no longer being the most senior IAF officers until Singh's death in 2017.

== Indonesia ==
Air Chief Marshal (Marsekal) is the highest rank in the Indonesian Air Force, equivalent to General in the Army and National Police, or Admiral in the Navy. This rank is characterized by four stars on the shoulder board. A higher but honorary five-star rank is Marshal of the Air Force, equivalent to General of the Army and Fleet Admiral. The rank of Air Chief Marshal in Indonesia is used for the positions of Chief of Staff of the Indonesian Air Force, Deputy Commander of the Indonesian National Armed Forces, or Commander of the Indonesian National Armed Forces.

== Namibia ==
In the Namibian Air Force, the rank is known as chief air marshal. To date, no officers have reached this rank.

== Nigeria ==
The Nigerian air chief marshal is the second highest-ranking officer in the Nigerian Air Force, below Marshal of the air force. Only the Chief of the Defence Staff holds four-star rank. The first Nigerian Air Force officer to attain the rank of air chief marshal was Paul Dike upon his appointment as the Nigerian Chief of Defence Staff in 2008. Dike was succeeded as Chief of the Defence Staff in 2010 by Air Chief Marshal Oluseyi Petinrin. In 2014, Alex Sabundu Badeh was appointed Chief of Defence Staff and promoted to air chief marshal. The Nigerian Chief of Air Staff is normally a three-star air marshal.

== Pakistan ==
In March 1976, as part of a Pakistani Defence Ministry reorganization, the post of Chief of Air Staff, the head of the Pakistan Air Force, was upgraded from air marshal to air chief marshal rank. To date all Pakistani air chief marshals have been members of the Joint Chiefs of Staff Committee. However, only Air Chief Marshal Farooq Feroze Khan has served as Chairman of the Joint Chiefs of Staff Committee, the supreme commandant of Pakistan Armed Forces.

Originally, a Pakistani air chief marshal's rank insignia was essentially the same as the RAF insignia. In 2006 the Pakistan Air Force changed the rank insignia for its officers, abandoning the ring insignia in favor of a Turkish Air Force-style featuring four stars and a crossed swords and laurel device.

== Sri Lanka ==
In Sri Lanka, only the Chief of Defence Staff holds an active four-star rank. Retiring Commanders of the Sri Lanka Air Force are promoted to the rank of air chief marshal as an outgoing honour. Air Chief Marshal Donald Perera was the first CDS appointed from the Air Force and Air Chief Marshal Roshan Goonetileke became the first serving Air Force Commander to be appointed to the rank of air chief marshal as part of the victory celebrations.

== Thailand ==
The officer appointed to command the Royal Thai Air Force has been promoted to the rank of air chief marshal (Thai: พลอากาศเอก, romanized: Phon Akat Ek) since c. 1950. The present commander is Air Chief Marshal Alongkorn Wannarot who is supported by the Deputy Commander-in-Chief (currently Air Chief Marshal Chanon Mungthanya) and the Assistant Commander-in-Chief (currently Air Chief Marshal Punpakdee Pattanakul). If an air force officer is appointed to the position of Chief of Defence Forces (formerly Supreme Commander), then he has always held the rank of air chief marshal. The last air chief marshal to be appointed Supreme Commander was Air Chief Marshal Voranat Aphichari who retired in 1994.

In November 2007 it became known that Crown Prince Vajiralongkorn (now king of Thailand) had granted the title of Air Chief Marshal to his pet poodle Fufu. The dog died in 2015.

== United Kingdom ==
Air chief marshal
- Shoulder board and sleeve insignia

- Masthead distinguishing flag

- Motor car star plate
- Country: United Kingdom
- Service branch: Royal Air Force
- Abbreviation: Air Chf Mshl / ACM
- Rank group: Officers of air rank
- Rank: Four-star rank
- NATO rank code: OF-9
- Formation: 1 August 1919
- Next higher rank: Marshal of the Royal Air Force
- Next lower rank: Air marshal
- Equivalent ranks: Admiral (RN); General (British Army; RM)

=== Origins ===
Prior to the adoption of RAF-specific rank titles in 1919, it was suggested that the RAF might use the Royal Navy's officer ranks, with the word "air" inserted before the naval rank title. For example, the rank that later became air chief marshal would have been air admiral. The Admiralty objected to any use of their rank titles, including this modified form, and so an alternative proposal was put forward: air-officer ranks would be based on the term "ardian", which was derived from a combination of the Gaelic words for "chief" (ard) and "bird" (eun), with the unmodified word "ardian" being used specifically for the equivalent to full admiral and general. However, air chief marshal was preferred and was adopted in August 1919. The rank was first used on 1 April 1922 with the promotion of Sir Hugh Trenchard. With Trenchard's promotion to marshal of the RAF on 1 January 1927, no officer held the rank until Sir John Salmond was promoted on 1 January 1929. It has been used continuously ever since.

In the RAF, the rank of air chief marshal is held by the serving Chief of the Air Staff (currently Harvey Smyth). Additionally, RAF officers appointed to four-star tri-service posts hold the rank of air chief marshal. Throughout the history of the RAF, 142 RAF officers have held the rank and it has also been awarded in an honorary capacity to senior members of the British royal family and allied foreign monarchs.

Although no serving RAF officer has been promoted to marshal of the Royal Air Force since the British defence cuts of the 1990s, British air chief marshals are not the most senior officers in the RAF as several officers continue to retain the RAF's highest rank. Additionally, Lord Stirrup was granted an honorary promotion to marshal of the Royal Air Force in 2014. The marshals are still to be found on the RAF's active list even though they have for all practical purposes retired.

=== RAF insignia, command flag and star plate ===
The rank insignia consists of three narrow light blue bands (each on a slightly wider black band) over a light blue band on a broad black band. This is worn on the lower sleeves of the service dress jacket or on the shoulders of the flying suit or working uniform. The command flag for an RAF air chief marshal is defined by the two broad red bands running through the centre of the flag. The vehicle star plate for an RAF air chief marshal depicts four white stars (air chief marshal is a four-star rank) on an air force blue background.

== Gallery ==
(Royal Australian Air Force)

(Bangladesh Air Force)

(Ghana Air Force)

(Indian Air Force)

(Namibian Air Force)

(Nigerian Air Force)

(Pakistan Air Force)

(Sri Lanka Air Force)

(Royal Air Force)

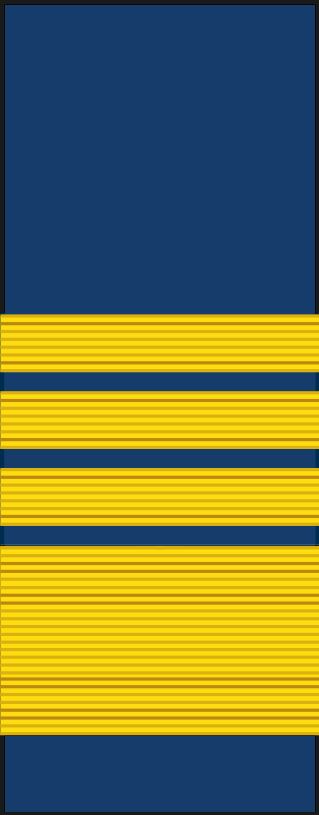
(Air Force of Zimbabwe)

== See also ==
- Air force officer rank insignia
- British and U.S. military ranks compared
- Comparative military ranks
