= Shaikh Abdul Hannan =

Former Chief of Air Staff of Bangladesh Air Force

- শেখ আব্দুল হান্নান
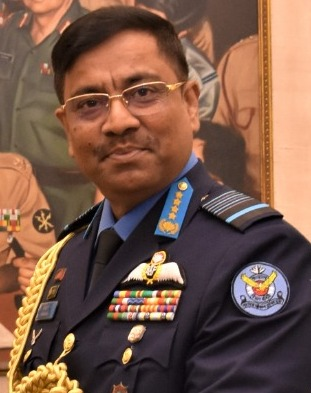
- Military Portrait

16th Chief of Air Staff
- In office 12 June 2021 – 11 June 2024
- President: Abdul Hamid; Mohammed Shahabuddin
- Prime Minister: Sheikh Hasina
- Preceded by: Masihuzzaman Serniabat
- Succeeded by: Hasan Mahmood Khan

Personal details
- Born: 1 August 1963 (age 63) Bagerhat, East Pakistan
- Education: Bhola Govt. College; Defence Services Command and Staff College; PAF Air War College; National Defence University, Pakistan

Military service
- Allegiance: Bangladesh
- Branch/service: Bangladesh Air Force
- Years of service: 1981–2024
- Rank: Air Chief Marshal
- Unit: No. 18 Squadron
- Commands: AOC of BAF Base Matiur Rahman; Commandant of Bangabandhu Aeronautical Centre; Senior Directing Staff (Air) of National Defence College; AOC of BAF Base Sheikh Hasina; Deputy commandant of Defence Services Command and Staff College; CO of 101st Special Flying Unit
- Battles/wars: UNMIBH, MONUSCO

Shaikh Abdul Hannan (born 1 August 1963) is a Bangladeshi retired four-star air officer who served as the 16th chief of air staff of the Bangladesh Air Force. On 12 June 2021, Hannan took over command of the Bangladesh Air Force from his predecessor Masihuzzaman Serniabat.

== Career ==
Hannan was commissioned on 14 July 1984 as a general duties pilot. He is a category 'A' pilot and a qualified flying instructor. He also holds the proficiency wing and is chief examiner of the helicopter examiner board of MI-17/171. An alumnus of Defence Services Command and Staff College (DSCSC), Mirpur. Hannan graduated from Pakistan Air Force Air War College in 1999 and received his MDS and MSS degrees. He is the top graduate of the 2014 class of National Defence University, Islamabad, where he received his MSc in national security and war studies while completing the National Security and War Course (nswc).

Hannan served in the United Nations Protection Force in Bosnia Herzegovina (UNPROFOR) in 1995. He also led the BAF Contingent (BAN AIR-4) in the United Nations Mission in the Democratic Republic of the Congo (MONUC) in 2006–07.

On 12 June 2021, Prime Minister Sheikh Hasina appointed Hannan as chief of air staff, and he assumed charge on 12 June 2021.

== Controversies ==
Hannan has been accused of embezzling more than $245 million from the Bangladesh Air Force's annual budget and siphoning it out of the country to Canada, the United States and the United Arab Emirates. The Anti-Corruption Commission has been investigating the matter after a formal complaint has been filed by a group of lawyers. In May 2025, a travel ban was issued against him and his wife by the Dhaka Metropolitan Senior Special Judge Md. Zakir Hossain. His and his family's accounts were frozen following a court verdict. Bangladesh's court ordered action following an anti-corruption watchdog claim that Hannan purchased multiple apartments for his mistress, Sanjida Akhter, to conceal illegal wealth. Qatari police arrested Hannan in Qatar under an Interpol arrest warrant and informed the Bangladesh anti-corruption watchdog.

== Personal life ==
He is married to Tahmida Hannan, and the couple has a son.

Military offices
Preceded by Air chief marshal Masihuzzaman Serniabat	Chief of Air Staff; 12 June 2021 – 11 June 2024	Succeeded by Hasan Mahmood Khan
