= Air Chief Marshal (Bangladesh) =

Highest achieved rank in the Bangladesh Air Force

Air Chief Marshal এয়ার চীফ মার্শাল
- Shoulder Sleeve of Air Chief Marshal

- Vehicle Star plate of Air Chief Marshal
- Country: Bangladesh
- Service branch: Bangladesh Air Force
- Abbreviation: ACM
- Rank group: Air officer Flag officer
- Rank: Four Star
- NATO rank code: OF-9
- Non-NATO rank: O-10
- Next lower rank: Air marshal
- Equivalent ranks: General (Army); Admiral (Navy)

Air Chief Marshal (Bengali: এয়ার চীফ মার্শাল) is a four-star commissioned air officer rank in the Bangladesh Air Force. It is the highest achieved rank in the Bangladesh Air Force. Air chief marshal ranks above the three-star rank of Air marshal. The rank is denoted as a full-fledged marshal to extricate subordinate officers like air marshal and air vice marshal which are also air officer.

The rank was established in 2016, when Abu Esrar was promoted to this rank. Only the Chief of Air Staff (CAS) of Bangladesh Air Force gets this rank.

The current Air chief marshal and COAS of Bangladesh Air Force is Air Chief Marshal Hasan Mahmood Khan.

== Insignia ==
The rank insignia consists of three narrow light blue bands (each on a slightly wider black band) over a light blue band on a broad black band. This is worn on the lower sleeves of the service dress jacket or on the shoulders of the flying suit or working uniform. The vehicle star plate for an BAF air chief marshal depicts four white stars (air chief marshal is a four-star rank) on an air force blue background.

== Appointment and term length ==
The position is appointed by The Prime Minister of The People's Republic of Bangladesh with the advice and consent of the President of Bangladesh. The maximum length of the term is 3 years or at the age of 60 of the holder, whichever is earlier.

== List of air chief marshals ==
- Air Chief Marshal Abu Esrar
- Air Chief Marshal Masihuzzaman Serniabat
- Air Chief Marshal Shaikh Abdul Hannan
- Air Chief Marshal Hasan Mahmood Khan

== See also ==
- Chief of Army Staff (Bangladesh)
- Chief of Naval Staff (Bangladesh)
- Chief of Air Staff (Bangladesh)
- List of serving marshals of the Bangladesh Air Force
- Military ranks of Bangladesh
- Awards and decorations of the Bangladesh Armed Forces
