= Bangladesh Air Force Welfare Trust =

Trust That Provides Welfare to Retired Bangladesh Air Force Officers

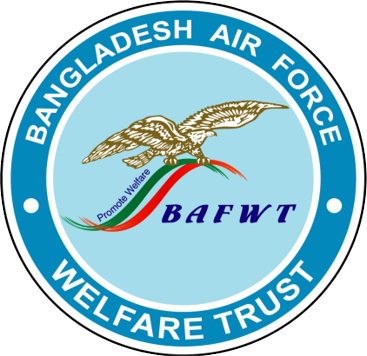
- Abbreviation: BAFWT
- Formation: 2010
- Headquarters: Dhaka, Bangladesh
- Region served: Bangladesh
- Official language: Bengali
- CEO: Gp Capt A H M Touhid-Ul-Ahsan, BPP, psc
- Main organ: Board of Trustee
- Parent organization: Bangladesh Air Force
- Website: bafwt.baf.mil.bd//

Bangladesh Air Force Welfare Trust (BAFWT) (Bengali: বাংলাদেশ বিমান বাহিনী কল্যাণ ট্রাস্ট) is a Bangladesh Air Force supported trust that works for the welfare of retired air force personnel and their families. Air Chief Marshal Hasan Mahmud Khan, Chief of the Air Staff of the Bangladesh Air Force, is the Present chairperson of the trust.

== History ==
Bangladesh Air Force Welfare Trust was established in 2010 under Shah Mohammad Ziaur Rahman, Chief of Air Staff and first chairperson of the trust. He served from 23 September 2010 to 12 June 2012. He was replaced by Muhammad Enamul Bari who served till 12 June 2015. Bari was replaced by Abu Esrar who served till 12 June 2018 and replaced by newly appointed chief of Bangladesh Air Force Masihuzzaman Serniabat.

Bangabandhu Sheikh Mujibur Rahman Aviation and Aerospace University is being developed by Bangladesh Air Force Welfare Trust and headed by the chief of Bangladesh Air Force.

On 14 June 2020, Bangladesh Air Force Welfare Trust arranged special flights of Biman Bangladesh Airlines and US-Bangla Airlines to bring in Bangladeshis trapped in Dubai aimed the COVID-19 pandemic. Similar flights were arranged to bring in Bangladeshis trapped in the United Kingdom, Malaysia, and Doha.

In March 2021, Bangladesh government allocated 1.24 billion taka for the development work at BSCIC Chemical Industrial Park, Munshiganj owned by Bangladesh Small and Cottage Industries Corporation. The government recommended that the work be given to Bangladesh Air Force Welfare Trust and Dockyard and Engineering Works Limited, owned by Bangladesh Navy, through Direct Purchase Procedure.

== Gallery ==
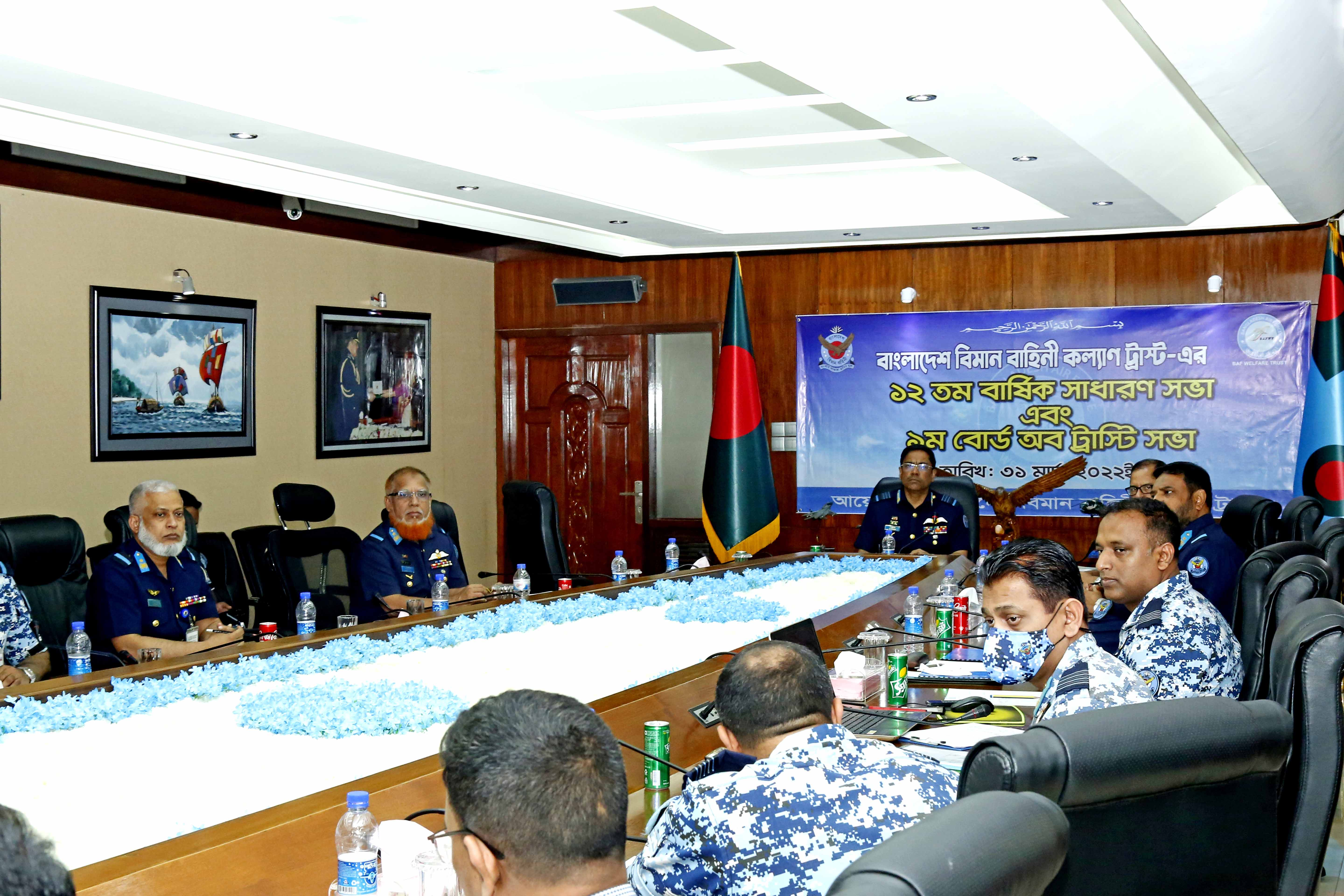
