= A. K. M. Manirul Bahar =

Bangladesh Air Force officer

- Military career
- Allegiance: Bangladesh
- Branch: Bangladesh Air Force
- Service years: 1987 - 2025
- Rank: Air Vice-Marshal
- Unit: No. 25 Squadron BAF
- Commands: Vice Chancellor of Aviation and Aerospace University, Bangladesh; AOC of BAF Base Cox's Bazar; FSR of BAF Base Bashar; Director (Air Defence) at Air Headquarters; Commandant of ATI
- Conflicts: UNIKOM; MONUSCO; MINUSMA

A K M Manirul Bahar BSP, ndc, hdmc, afwc, psc, ADWC is a retired Bangladesh Air Force officer and former vice chancellor of Aviation and Aerospace University, Bangladesh. Prior to join here, he served as air officer commanding (AOC) of Bangladesh Air Force Base Cox's Bazar. He served as director of air force headquarters, directorate of air defence.

== Career ==
Bahar was commissioned at Bangladesh Air Force in 1987 in general duties (pilot) branch. He successfully completed UN missions in Kuwait, DR Congo and Mali. While he was an air commodore, he also served at Bangladesh University of Professionals as the chief of public relations, information, and publications.
