= Jamal Uddin Ahmed (air officer) =

Bangladeshi military personnel

Air Marshal Jamal Uddin Ahmed

9th Chief of Air Staff
- In office 4 June 1995 – 3 June 2001
- President: Abdur Rahman Biswas; Shahabuddin Ahmed
- Prime Minister: Khaleda Zia; Muhammad Habibur Rahman (acting); Sheikh Hasina
- Preceded by: Altaf Hossain Chowdhury
- Succeeded by: Rafiqul Islam

Personal details
- Awards: Independence Day Award

Military service
- Allegiance: Pakistan (before 1972); Bangladesh
- Branch/service: Pakistan Air Force; Bangladesh Air Force
- Years of service: 1965 – 2001
- Rank: Air Marshal
- Commands: Commandant of Bangladesh Air Force Academy; Chief of Air Staff; Chairman of BBA

Jamal Uddin Ahmed is a retired air officer who served as the 9th chief of air staff of the Bangladesh Air Force and chairman of Biman Bangladesh Airlines.

== Career ==
He started his career as a Martin B-57 Canberra attack pilot in the Pakistan Air Force in 1964. During the Liberation War in 1971, he was a flight lieutenant and part of a joint NATO-CENTO Air Intelligence Training Program for NATO Air Force officers in the United States. He returned to Bangladesh in 1972 as a squadron leader and served as a flight instructor in 1976 and eventually commandant of Bangladesh Air Force Academy in 1983. He was promoted to air vice marshal and assigned as the chief of air staff on 4 June 1995.

On 3 June 2001, Ahmed was promoted to brevet air marshal on his leave per retirement by then Prime Minister Sheikh Hasina and joined as director of Biman Bangladesh Airlines. The Third Khaleda ministry voided his promotion in August 2004, declaring it unlawful. Ahmed appealed the decision to the High Court, which ruled in favour of him and restored his rank, prepotent that he had been disposed of out-of-court. He was ameliorated as chairman of Biman Bangladesh Airlines in 2009 but soon compromised in 2011 due to mismanagement. Ahmed was again reinstated as chairman of Biman on 21 January 2015 and left office on 14 October 2016 preceding Air Marshal Enamul Bari.

Military offices
Preceded by Air Vice Marshal Altaf Hossain Chowdhury	Chief of Air Staff; 1995–2001	Succeeded by Air Vice Marshal Mohammad Rafiqul Islam
