= Abu Esrar =

Bangladeshi Air Force Officer

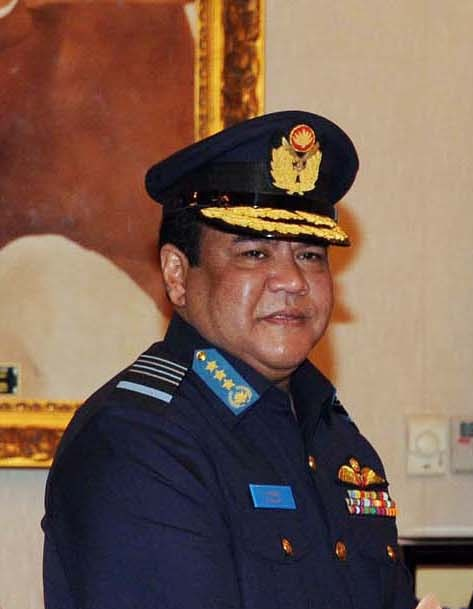
- Esrar in 2015

14th Chief of Air Staff
- In office 12 June 2015 – 12 June 2018
- President: Abdul Hamid
- Prime Minister: Sheikh Hasina
- Preceded by: Enamul Bari
- Succeeded by: Masihuzzaman Serniabat

Personal details
- Born: Abu Esrar; 23 December 1961 (age 64) Gazipur, East Pakistan, Pakistan

Military service
- Allegiance: Bangladesh
- Branch/service: Bangladesh Air Force
- Years of service: 1 February 1981 - 11 June 2018
- Rank: Air Chief Marshal
- Unit: No. 21 Squadron
- Commands: CO of No. 25 Squadron; CO of No. 35 Squadron; AOC of BAF Base Paharkanchanpur; AOC of BAF Base Bashar; AOC of BAF Base Zahurul Haque; ACAS (Operations & Training) at Air Headquarters; Chief of Air Staff

Abu Esrar, BBP, ndc, acsc was the 14th Chief of the Air Staff of the Bangladesh Air Force. He is the first Four Star Air Officer of the Air Force.

== Early life ==
Esrar was born on 23 December 1961 in Gazipur to Abu Ayub and Akhtarunnesa.

== Military career ==
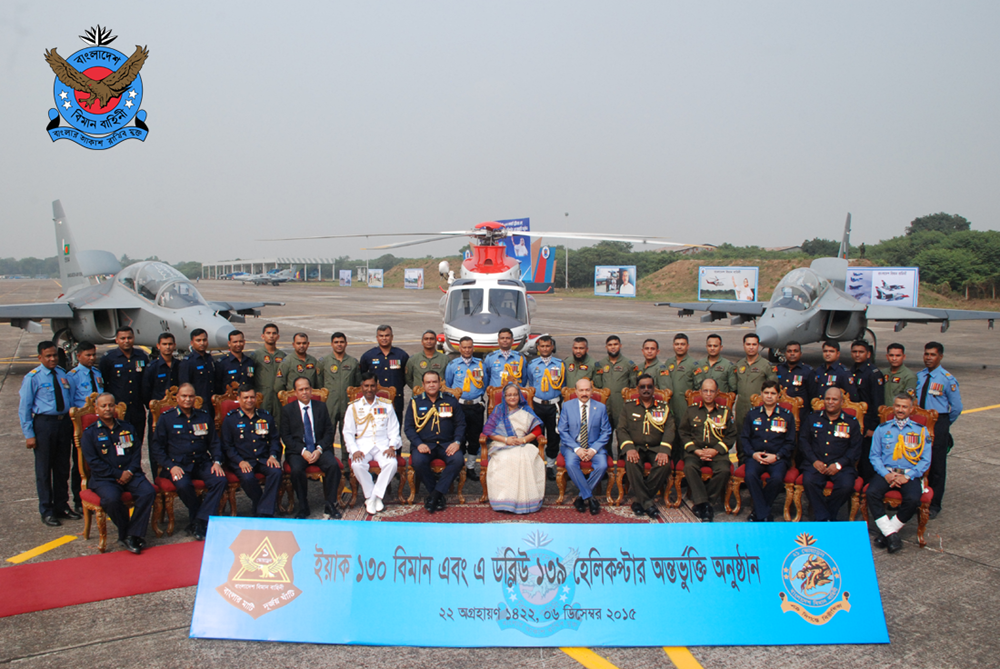
Esrar with then prime minister Sheikh Hasina at BAF Base Bangabandhu in December 2015

Esrar joined the Bangladesh Air Force on 19 September 1978 and was commissioned in the GD(P) branch on 1 February 1981. He is an alumnus of National Defence College and Air Command and Staff College of Maxwell Air Force Base in the United States. Esrar has undergone flying instructors course in the United Kingdom and flying supervisors course in Australia. He has obtained training under Mikoyan Project 1.44 and MiG-29 in China and Russia respectively.

Esrar has flown Fugi-200, Chengdu J-7, MiG-29 and worked as instructor at Bangladesh Air Force Academy. He has also worked as defence attache in Moscow, Russia. As air commodore, Esrar has commanded three airbases and was director of air training. He was promoted to air vice marshal in 2012 and posted as assistant chief of air staff (operation and training) which he served until 2015. He replaced Air Marshal Enamul Bari as chief of air staff. On 16 January 2016 he was promoted to air chief marshal under the third Hasina ministry. Esrar was also awarded the Biman Bahini Padak medal in 2013.

Military offices
Preceded by Air Marshal Enamul Bari	Chief of Air Staff; 2016–2018	Succeeded by Air Marshal Masihuzzaman Serniabat
