= Shah Mohammad Ziaur Rahman =

Chief of Staff of the Bangladesh Air Force

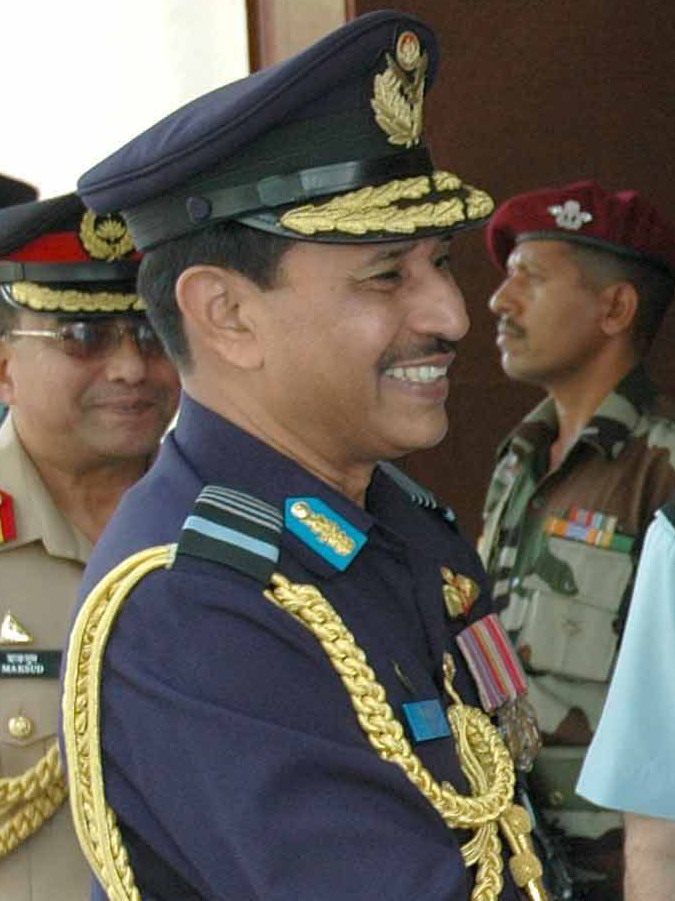
- Rahman in 2009

12th Chief of Air Staff
- In office 8 April 2007 – 12 June 2012
- President: Iajuddin Ahmed; Zillur Rahman
- Prime Minister: Fakhruddin Ahmed (acting); Sheikh Hasina
- Preceded by: Fakhrul Azam
- Succeeded by: Enamul Bari

Personal details
- Born: 11 January 1955 (age 71) Gopalganj, East Bengal, Dominion of Pakistan

Military service
- Allegiance: Bangladesh
- Branch/service: Bangladesh Air Force
- Years of service: 1976-2012
- Rank: Air Marshal
- Unit: No. 1 Squadron
- Commands: CO of No. 25 Squadron; CO of No. 35 Squadron; Station Commander of BAF Station Shamshernagar; AOC of BAF Base Paharkanchanpur; AOC of BAF Base Bashar; AOC of BAF Base Zahurul Haq; ACAS (Operation & Training) at Air Headquarters; Chief of Air Staff

Shah Mohammad Ziaur Rahman, ndc, afwc, psc (born 11 January 1955) is a former air officer who is the first operational three star rank officer and chief of air staff at the Bangladesh Air Force.

== Early life and education ==
Rahman was born on 11 January 1955 into a Muslim family in Gopalgonj. He joined the Bangladesh Air Force as a flight cadet on March 10, 1975, and was commissioned on December 29, 1976, as a general duties (pilot) officer.

Rahman obtained his command course from the Defence Service and Staff College in 1991 and air staff course from the Pakistan Air Force War College in 1992. He also graduated from the National Defence College, Pakistan, in 2001. Rahman later participated in the seminars for "Executive Course" at the Asia-Pacific Center for Security Studies in "Military and Peace Keeping Operations in Accordance with Rule of Law" course in 2003 and 2006, respectively.

== Military career ==
Rahman has flown MiG-21 and Chengdu J-7 and oversaw the Fouga CM.170 Magister course in the Bangladesh Air Force Academy.

As wing commander, Rahman commanded two squadrons and one radar station. He was promoted to group captain in 1995 while commanding BAF Station Shamshernagar. Rahman also commanded three airbases and was promoted to air commodore in 2000. He was designated as assistant chief of air staff (operations & training) at Air Headquarters on 12 September 2005.

=== As chief of air staff ===
Rahman was promoted from air commodore to air vice-marshal and appointed the chief of air staff on 8 April 2007. He was soon promoted to air marshal on 24 May of the same year. As chief of staff, he emphasized the operation of aircraft, and a modernization of the ageing Bangladesh air fleet. He is notable for initiating a modern personnel evaluation system in the air force that resulted in revolutionary improvements in the aircraft flight output, research and development sectors. The participation of the air force in United Nations peacekeeping missions had increased manifold during Rahman's tenure of office, as quantities of air personnel have received many accolades from world leaders and the United Nations. He retired on 12 June 2012 and was succeeded by Air Marshal Enamul Bari.

== Personal life ==
Zia is married and has one son and one daughter.

== See also ==
- Bangabandhu Aeronautical Centre

Military offices
Preceded by Air Vice Marshal Fakhrul Azam	Chief of Air Staff; 2007 – 2012	Succeeded by Air Marshal Enamul Bari
