= Masihuzzaman Serniabat =

Chief of the Air Staff of the Bangladesh Air Force

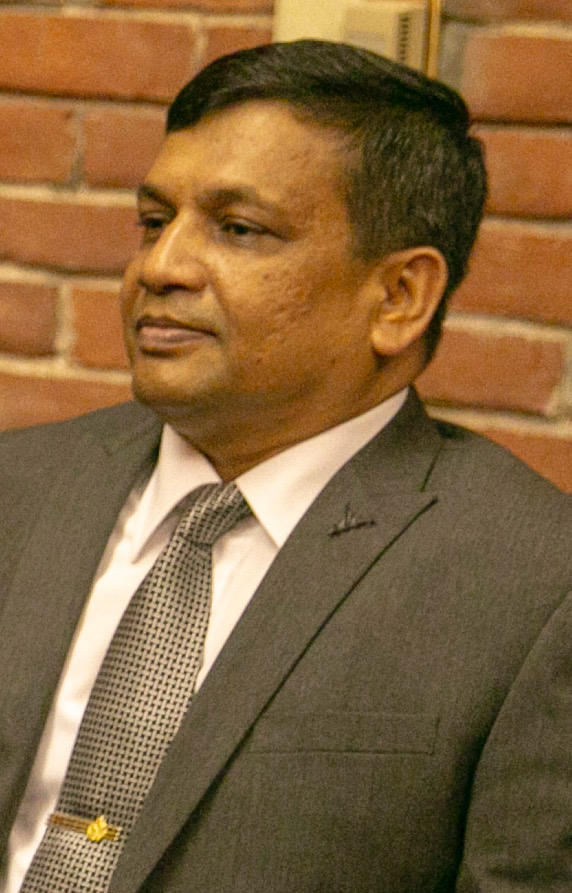
- Masihuzzaman Serniabat in 2018

15th Chief of Air Staff
- In office 12 June 2018 – 12 June 2021
- President: Abdul Hamid
- Prime Minister: Sheikh Hasina
- Preceded by: Abu Esrar
- Succeeded by: Shaikh Abdul Hannan

Personal details
- Born: 14 February 1962 (age 64) Dacca, East Pakistan, Pakistan

Military service
- Allegiance: Bangladesh
- Branch/service: Bangladesh Air Force
- Years of service: 1982–2021
- Rank: Air Chief Marshal
- Commands: DS (Air) at Defence Services Command and Staff College; SI (Air) at Defence Services Command and Staff College; Director, Air Training at Air Headquarters; Director, Air Operations at Air Headquarters; Director, Plans and Air Secretary at Air Headquarters; AOC of BAF Base Matiur Rahman; AOC of BAF Base Bangabandhu; Assistant Chief of Air Staff (Administration); Assistant Chief of Air Staff (Operations)

Masihuzzaman Serniabat, BBP, OSP, ndu, psc (Bengali: মাসিহুজ্জামান সেরনিয়াবাত; born 14 February 1962) is a former four star air officer who was the 15th chief of air staff of the Bangladesh Air Force. He was promoted to the rank of air chief marshal on 30 July 2018.

== Early life ==
Serniabat was born on 14 February 1962. He was educated at Notre Dame College, Dhaka, and then enrolled at the Bangladesh Air Force Academy on 16 March 1980, graduating in June 1982.

== Career ==
Serniabat was commissioned into the Bangladesh Air Force on 19 June 1982 in the General Duties (Pilot) Branch. He flew various types of aircraft, including PT-6, Fouga, F-6, F-7, F-7 BG, F-7MB, A-5, MiG-29, YAK-130 and SU-30 MKI (A). He attended a number of courses at home and abroad. He is a graduate of the Defence Services Command and Staff College in Bangladesh, the Royal Malaysian Armed Forces Staff College in Malaysia and the National Defence University in China.

Serniabat became the chairperson of the Bangladesh Air Force Welfare Trust on 12 June 2018.

== Personal life ==
He is married to Yasmeen Zaman and has one son and one daughter.

Military offices
Preceded by Air Chief Marshal Abu Esrar	Chief of Air Staff; 2018 – 2021	Succeeded by Air Marshal Shaikh Abdul Hannan
