= PAF Air War College =

Military college in Karachi, Pakistan

PAF Air War College Institute
- پی اے ایف ایئر وار کالج انسٹی ٹیوٹ
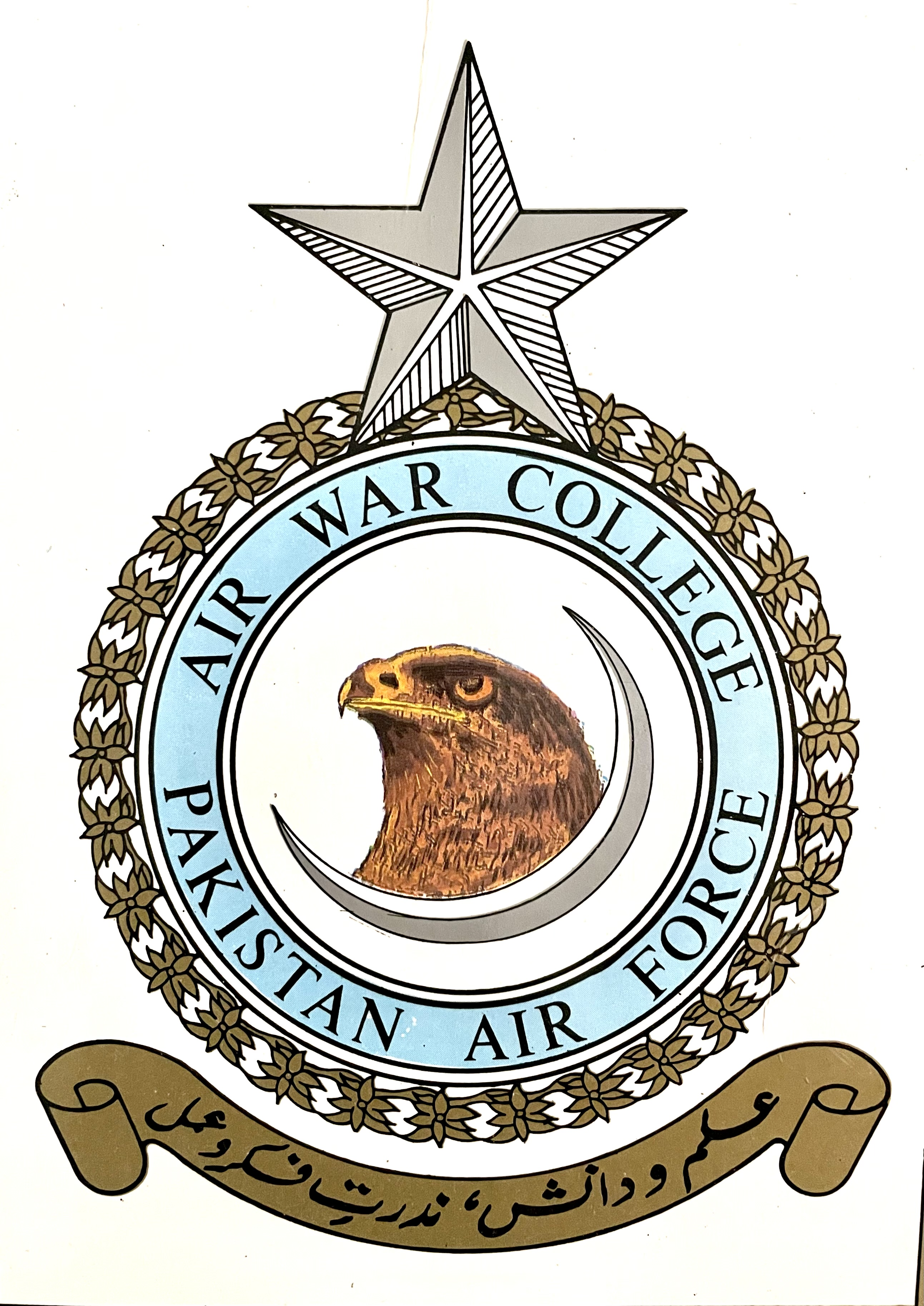
- Former names: PAF Staff College (1958-86); Pakistan Air War College (1986-2021)
- Motto: Urdu: علم و دانش نذرت ا فکر و عمل
- Motto in English: Knowledge and wisdom is the gift of thought and action
- Type: War college Constituent college of the National Defence University, Islamabad
- Established: 1958; 68 years ago
- Affiliations: University of Karachi (1980-2005); Air University Pakistan (2005-2007); National Defence University, Islamabad (since 2007)
- President: Air Vice Marshal Hussain Ahmed Siddiqui
- Location: Karachi, Sindh, Pakistan; 24°52′42″N 67°6′56″E
- Website: https://awci.edu.pk PAF Air War College

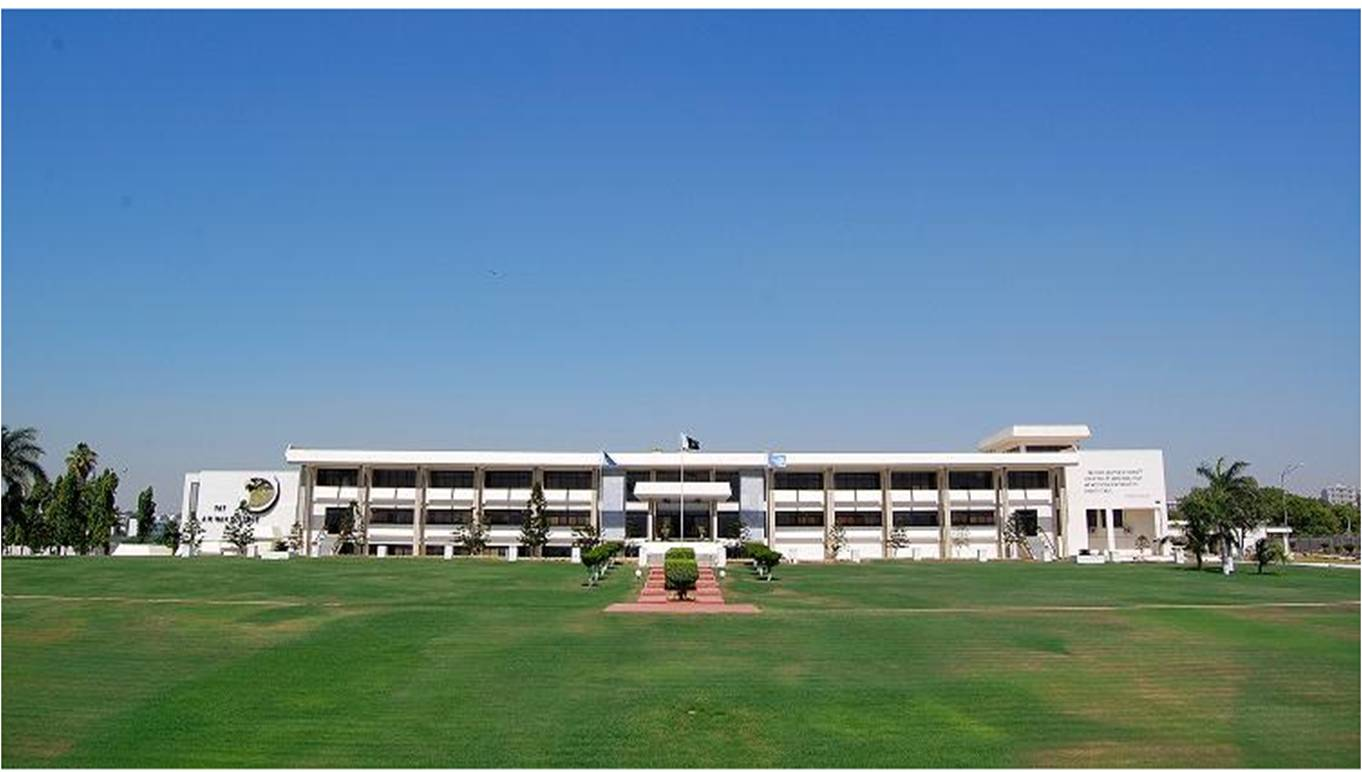
PAF Air War College Building, 2010

PAF Air War College Institute is the Pakistan Air Force academic establishment located at PAF Base Faisal in Karachi, providing training and education primarily to mid-career officers of the air force as well as a limited number of officers from Pakistan Navy, Pakistan Army and allied forces. The college was affiliated with University of Karachi from 1980 to 2005, Air University Pakistan from 2005 to 2007, since then affiliated with the National Defence University, Islamabad along with other staff and war colleges of the Pakistan Army and Pakistan Navy.

== History ==
Established at PAF Station Drigh Road on 5 January 1959 with Commandant Air Commodore CBE Burt Andrews borrowed on Secondment from the Royal Air Force.

The college was housed in a converted hospital building at the station and was inaugurated by President of Pakistan Muhammad Ayub Khan. After conducting the initial courses, the RAF component of the faculty which comprised three officers reverted to their parent organization in December 1961. The college was then taken over entirely by the officers from Pakistan Air Force.

In 1980, the Bachelor of Defence Management Cell was created to offer Bachelor of Defence Management courses, affiliated with the Institute of Business Administration at Karachi University for awarding degrees. Due to rapid technological advancements in modern warfare, the PAF recognized the need for a specialized institution focused on the study of war-related matters. Consequently, the Staff College was elevated to the status of an Air War College in 1987 under Commandant Air Commodore Nasir Ali.

This transformation included significant changes to the curriculum, upgrading the 45-week course to an Air War Course. In 1989, officers from friendly nations were admitted for the first time, and the entire organization relocated to a newly constructed building in 1990. The new facility was inaugurated by President of Pakistan Ghulam Ishaq Khan on 8 December 1991. Officers from allied countries include Bahrain, Bangladesh, China, Egypt, Indonesia, Iran, Iraq, Jordan, Kenya, Kuwait, Libya, Malaysia, Nigeria, Qatar, Saudi Arabia, Sri Lanka, Syria, Turkey, United Arab Emirates, Yemen and Zimbabwe are regular participants of the Air War course.

In August 2007, the In-Service Education Scheme for mid-career officers got replaced by Officers' Military Education. This change brought the officers' training program under the authority of the college's Commandant. Consequently, the Basic Staff School and Junior Command and Staff School were combined into a single entity known as JC&SS at PAF Camp Badaber. As of August 2010, the institution has seen 28 Staff Courses, 54 Senior Command and Staff Courses, and 23 Air War Courses successfully graduate.

== Courses ==
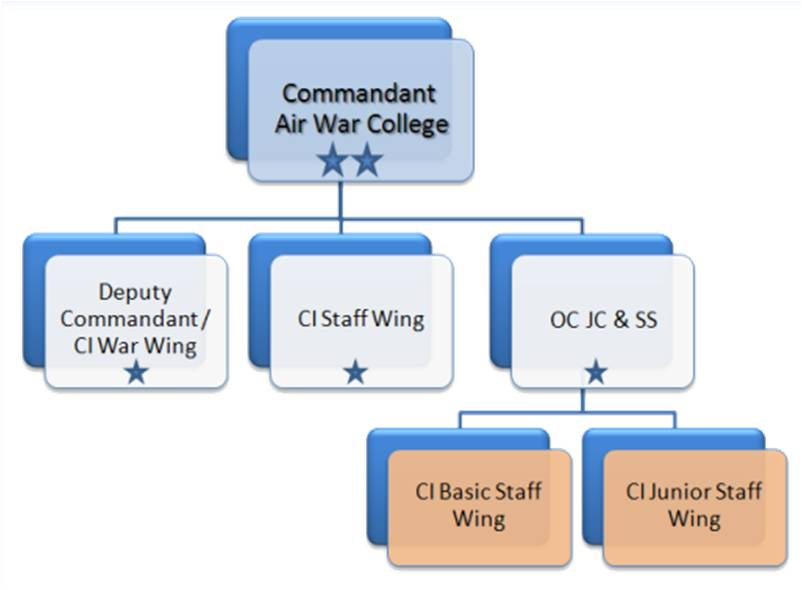
Hierarchy chart

The college offers two courses: the Air War Course (AWC) and the Senior Command and Staff Course (SC&SC). The AWC is designed to ready senior officers from the Pakistan Air Force and other countries for "senior command and staff roles," while the SC&SC is intended to "prepare mid-career PAF officers for taking on command and staff duties suitable for their rank and experience." After successfully completing the War Course, participants receive the 'fawc' symbol from the College and a Master of Science in War Studies from the National Defence University, Islamabad.

== Organization ==
Since 1996, the college is commanded by an Air Vice Marshal. Under the Commandant is a Deputy Commandant/Chief Instructor War Wing, which are both Air Commodores. In March, 2021, the College was upgraded to Institute (Degree Awarding Institute - DAI). Consequently, the 'Commandant' designation was replaced by the 'President' Air War College Institute. The Officer Commanding the Junior Command & Staff School is a Group Captain, who has a Chief Instructor Basic Staff Wing and Chief Instructor Junior Staff Wing under him.

== Mission ==
To educate senior air leaders in Doctrine, Policy, Strategy, Air power employment concept and prepare for war.

== Notable alumni ==
=== Pakistani ===
- Nur Khan, 3rd Commander-in-Chief of the Pakistan Air Force
- Air Commodore Sajad Haider, 1965 War Hero
- Zulfiqar Ali Khan, 2nd Chief of Air Staff
- Anwar Shamim, 3rd Chief of Air Staff
- Jamal A. Khan, 4th Chief of Air Staff
- Farooq Feroze Khan, 6th Chief of Air Staff
- Pervaiz Mehdi Qureshi, 8th Chief of Air Staff
- Mushaf Ali Mir, 9th Chief of Air Staff
- Kaleem Saadat, 10th Chief of Air Staff
- Rao Qamar Suleman, Chief of Air Staff
- Sohail Aman, 14th Chief of Air Staff
- Mujahid Anwar Khan, 15th Chief of Air Staff
- Zaheer Ahmad Babar, 16th Chief of Air Staff
- Hifazat Ullah Khan, former Vice Chief of Air Staff
- Abdul Razzaq Anjum, Deputy Chief of Air Staff – (Training)
- Yastur-ul-Haq Malik, 6th Chief of Naval Staff

=== International ===
- Shah Mohammad Ziaur Rahman, 12th Chief of Air Staff (Bangladesh)
- Shaikh Abdul Hannan, 16th Chief of Air Staff (Bangladesh)
- Mohd Asghar Khan Goriman Khan, 20th Chief of Air Force (Malaysia)

== Air War College Institute ==
In March 2021, Arif Alvi inaugurated the PAF Air War College Institute in Karachi.

== List of Commandants/Presidents ==
#	Name	Start of tenure	End of tenure
Commandant Air War College
1	Air Commodore CBE Burt Andrews	October 1958	December 1961
2	Air Commodore S. A. Yusuf	January 1962	December 1964
3	Air Commodore Abdul Qadir	January 1965	May 1966
4	Air Commodore Abdur Rahim Khan	May 1966	June 1968
5	Air Vice Marshal Mohammad Akhtar	September 1968	June 1969
6	Air Commodore Kamal Ahmed	December 1969	April 1972
7	Air Commodore Zafar Mahmud	February 1973	October 1973
8	Air Commodore Shamshul Huda Shah	October 1973	September 1974
9	Air Vice Marshal Eric G. Hall	October 1974	June 1975
10	Air Commodore Ayaz Ahmed Khan	September 1975	July 1978
11	Air Commodore Saeed A Ansari	August 1978	August 1979
12	Air Commodore Hamid Qureshi	August 1979	August 1980
13	Air Vice Marshal Nawabzada Rehmat Khan	October 1980	May 1981
14	Air Commodore S Masud Akhtar Hatmi	May 1981	December 1983
15	Air Commodore Farooq Umar	December 1983	April 1985
16	Air Commodore Altaf Sheikh	June 1985	June 1986
17	Air Commodore Nasir Ali	June 1986	July 1988
18	Air Commodore Aliuddin	July 1988	December 1989
19	Air Commodore Pervez I Mirza	January 1990	June 1992
20	Air Vice Marshal Shahid Zulifqar	June 1992	April 1993
21	Air Commodore Riffat Munir	April 1993	December 1993
22	Air Commodore Zulifqar Ahmed Shah	December 1993	January 1996
23	Air Vice Marshal Qazi Javed Ahmed	January 1996	July 1997
24	Air Vice Marshal Salim Arshad	December 1997	January 2000
25	Air Vice Marshal Masood Akhtar	January 2000	December 2000
25	Air Vice Marshal Saleem Akhtar Nawaz	July 2001	December 2001
26	Air Vice Marshal Maqbool Ali Shah	January 2002	March 2003
27	Air Vice Marshal M Ateeb Siddiqui	April 2003	October 2003
28	Air Vice Marshal Rao Qamar Suleman	October 2003	October 2005
29	Air Vice Marshal M Ateeb Siddiqui	October 2005	October 2006
30	Air Vice Marshal Tubrez Asif	November 2006	November 2010
31	Air Vice Marshal Azher Hassan	November 2010	December 2012
32	Air Vice Marshal Farooq Habib	December 2012	March 2015
33	Air Vice Marshal Pirzada Kamaluddin	October 2015	July 2017
34	Air Vice Marshal Abrar Ahmed	July 2017	July 2019
35	Air Vice Marshal Zulfiquar Ahmed Qureshi	July 2019	March, 2021
President Air War College Institute
1	Air Vice Marshal Zulfiquar Ahmed Qureshi	March, 2021	July, 2021
2	Air Vice Marshal Hussain Ahmed Siddiqui	July 2021	Incumbent

== List of Deputy/Assistant Commandants ==
#	Name	Start of tenure	End of tenure
1	Group Captain S. A. Joseph	September 1958	March 1959
2	Group Captain Abdul Qadir	March 1959	March 1960
3	Group Captain Eric G. Hall	March 1960	December 1961
4	Group Captain R A Simpson (RAF)	December 1961	December 1963
5	Air Commodore Saeedullah Khan	January 1964	September 1964
6	Group Captain H M C Misra	June 1966	September 1971
7	Group Captain A Rashid Sheikh	September 1971	July 1973
8	Air Commodore Mahmood Choonara	October 1973	June 1974
9	Group Captain Shahid Hussain	June 1974	December 1974
10	Group Captain Kamal Masud Hasan	December 1974	October 1975
11	Group Captain K Anwar Mirza	October 1975	August 1976
12	Group Captain M M Sohail	August 1976	June 1978
13	Group Captain Imtiaz A Bhatti	June 1978	August 1978
14	Group Captain Ali Kazim	August 1978	April 1979
15	Group Captain Nasir Ali	April 1979	July 1980
16	Group Captain Farooq Feroze Khan	July 1980	December 1980
17	Group Captain Jaweed Ahsan	December 1980	January 1982
18	Group Captain Rashid A Bhatti	June 1982	June 1984
19	Group Captain Saeed Anwar	December 1984	April 1986
20	Group Captain Mushtaq A Laghari	April 1986	July 1986
21	Group Captain Javed Aslam	October 1986	April 1987
22	Group Captain Fareed A Shah	August 1987	December 1987
23	Group Captain Tanvir Afghan	December 1987	July 1988
24	Group Captain Khalid Sattar	October 1988	July 1989
25	Group Captain Pervez I Mirza	July 1989	January 1990
25	Group Captain Hameedullah Khan	February 1990	February 1991
26	Group Captain Ata ur Rehman	February 1991	June 1991
27	Group Captain Aurangzeb Azim	July 1991	August 1992
28	Air Commodore Riffat Munir	August 1992	April 1993
29	Air Commodore Javed Ishaq Khan	June 1993	August 1994
30	Group Captain M. Abdul Qadir Sargaana	August 1994	July 1995
31	Air Commodore M. Abdul Qadir Sargaana	July 1995	July 1996
32	Air Commodore Jamshed Afzal	July 1996	July 1997
33	Air Commodore Arshad H Siraj	July 1997	November 1999
34	Air Commodore Kaiser Tufail	July 2000	January 2003
35	Air Commodore M Ateeb Siddiqui	January 2003	April 2003
36	Air Commodore M Jamshed Khan	October 2003	August 2004
37	Air Commodore Kazim Ali Awan	August 2004	June 2006
38	Air Commodore Zaheer A Khan	June 2006	October 2008
39	Air Commodore M Shahid Khan	October 2008	N/A
