= Bangladesh Air Force Academy =

Officer Cadets training institution of Bangladesh Air Force

- বাংলাদেশ বিমান বাহিনী একাডেমি
- Coat of arms of BAFA
- Motto: নীলাকাশ মম পরিধি
- Motto in English: Sky is the limit
- Type: Air force academy
- Established: 1982; 44 years ago
- Affiliations: Air Force Command and Staff Training Institute (CSTI)
- Commandant: Air Commodore Mustafa Nazmul Alam, GUP, rcds, acsc, psc
- Location: BAF Base Matiur Rahman at Jashore, Bangladesh
- Campus: Suburb
- Website: Bangladesh Air Force Academy

Bangladesh Air Force Academy (BAFA) (Bengali: বাংলাদেশ বিমান বাহিনী একাডেমি) is a training and education academy which provides initial training to all men and women who are preparing to be officers in the Bangladesh Air Force. The Bangladesh Air Force Academy is located in the district town of Jashore at Matiur Rahman Air Force Base. An air officer (e.g., an Air Commodore) serves as its Commandant.

== History ==
After the Liberation War, the need of having an academy to train future Air Force leaders was earnestly felt. The idea of BAF Academy was crystallized in 1973 and the academic activities started under Cadets' Training Unit (CTU) in November 1974 at Kurmitola, Dhaka. The CTU was shifted to Jessore in April 1977 and renamed as the Cadets' Training Wing (CTW). With the growing need of time, the CTW was re-modeled as a full-fledged Academy and renamed as Bangladesh Air Force Academy (BAFA) in April 1982.

Besides military and other professional training, the academy introduced BSc (Aeronautics) program in 1984 under Rajshahi University. The affiliation of the same program was changed from Rajshahi University to National University in 1993 and later BA (Pass) and BBS (Pass) programs were introduced in 2004 & 2006 respectively under the same university. After the establishment of Bangladesh University of Professionals (BUP), all academic programs of this academy were placed under BUP in 2008. Moreover, Level-1 of BSc in Aeronautical Engineering program and Level-1 of BSc in Computer Science & Engineering program of Military Institute of Science and Technology (MIST), Dhaka are also being conducted in this academy since 2009 and 2014 respectively.

== Selection of cadets ==
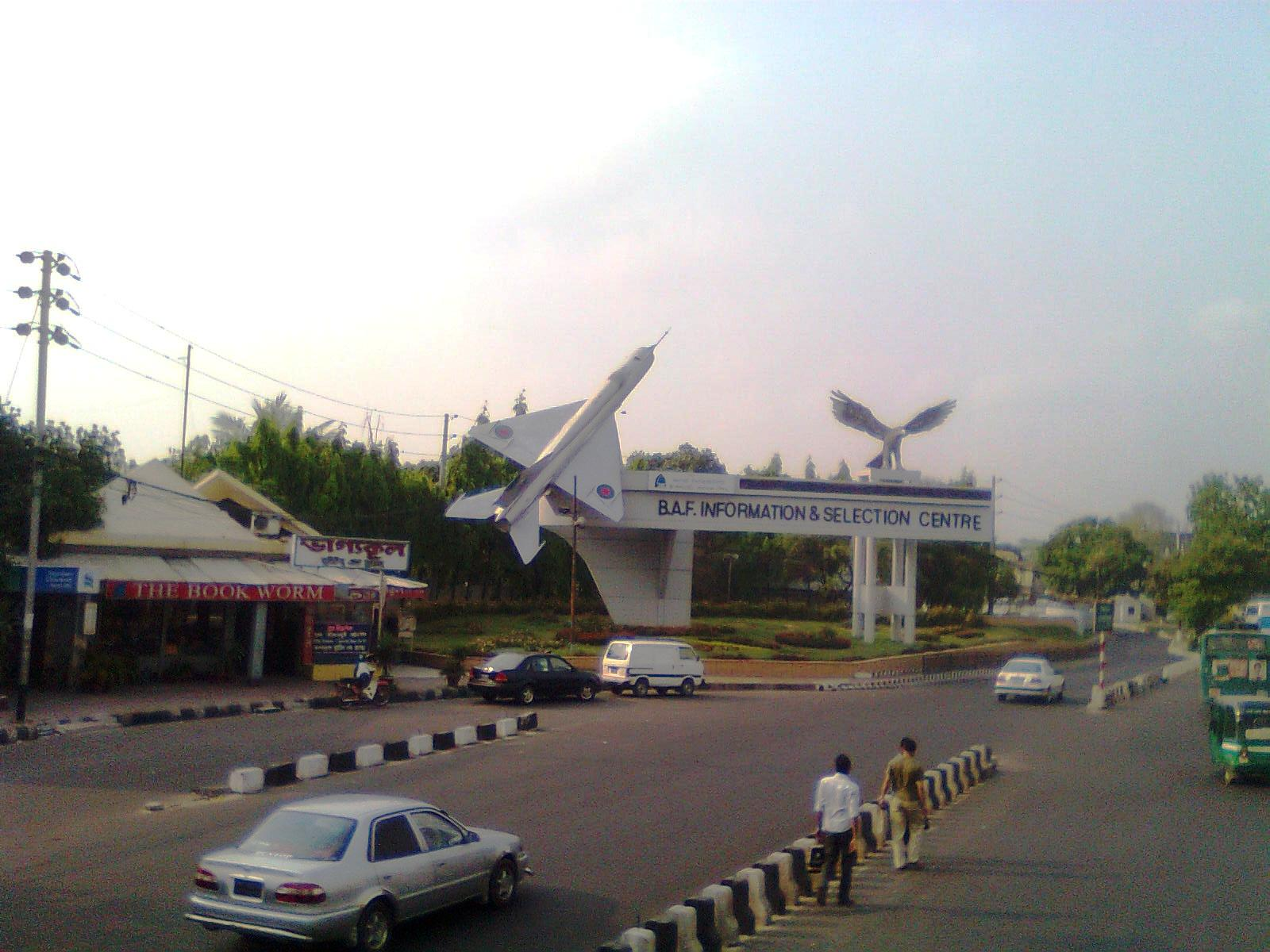
View of BAF Information and Selection Centre, Dhaka

Any legitimate Bangladeshi national male or female with requisite educational qualification, height, weight and age can apply for recruitment which is conducted round the year at Information & Selection Center, Tejgaon, Dhaka. Suitable candidates are selected after passing through different selection phases. For regular courses of different branch cadets, the selection procedure is as follows:

1. Preliminary written Test on IQ, English, Physics & Mathematics.
2. Preliminary VIVA & Medical Test.
3. ISSB board for five days.
4. Final Medical Test
5. Final Selection Exam for GD(P) & Engineering branch.
6. Final Interview at Air HQ.

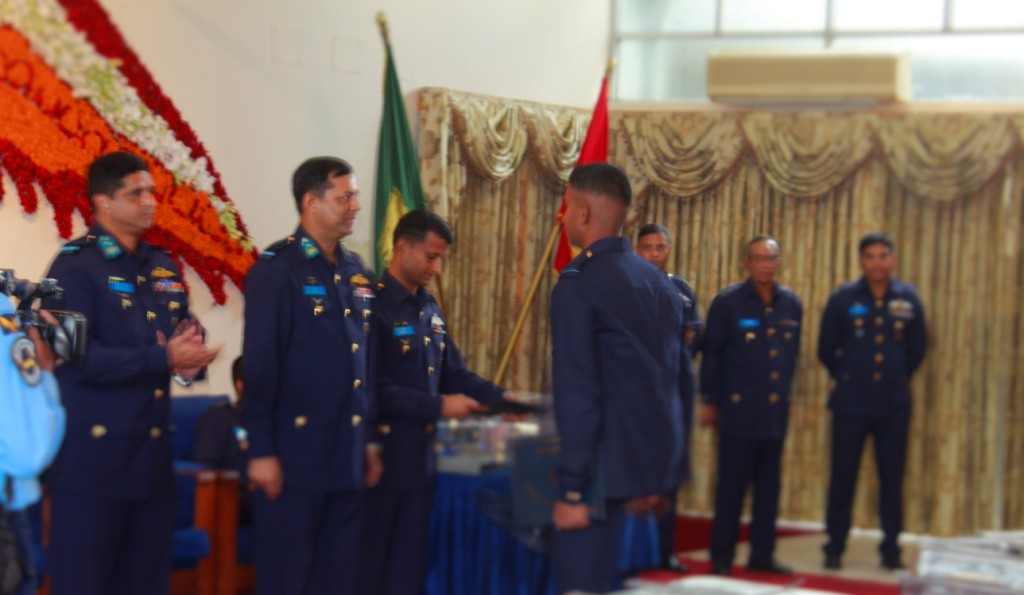
The certificate award ceremony of Bangladesh Air Force Academy graduates

== Training system ==
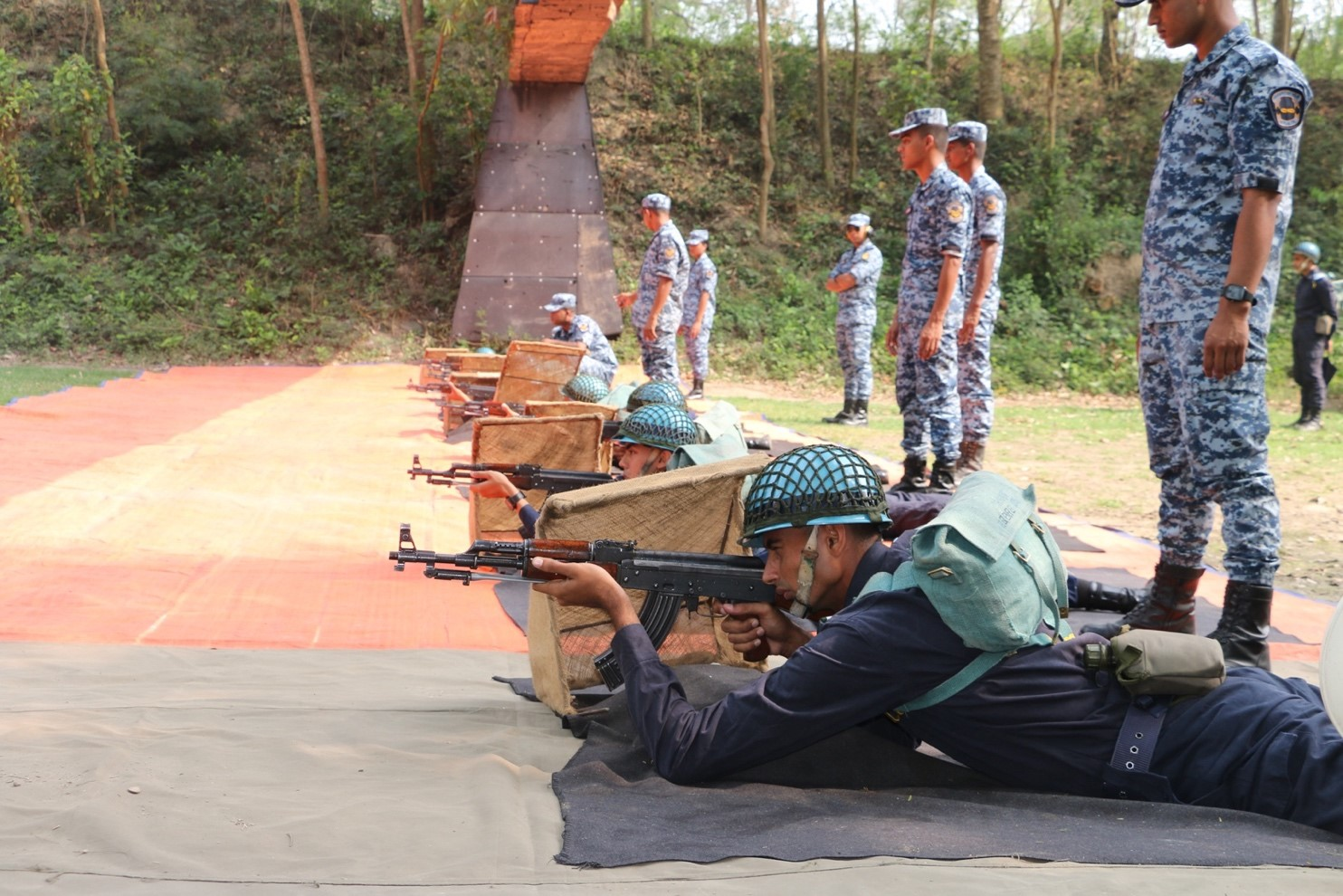
BAFA Cadets at training with BD-8's

Newly recruited cadets undergo three years of training before they receive a commission. Initially, BAF cadets join the Bangladesh Military Academy for a tenure of three months, where they undergo initial training with army and navy cadets. Following initial training, they return to their academy and join the Bangladesh Air Force Academy. At the academy, cadets receive general service training, armed combat training and education on different service-related subjects. The period at the academy is divided into four terms. For the first two terms, cadets only receive general service training and read service-related subjects. During the third term, the General Duties Branch cadets go for 120 hours basic flying training and other branches' cadets begin studying subjects such as engineering. After successful completion of three years training in the Bangladesh Air Force Academy, cadets are commissioned into different branches of the Bangladesh Air Force. Those branches are Administration, General Duty (Pilot) [GD(P)], Maintenance (Technical Engineering), Maintenance (Technical Communication and Electronics), Maintenance (Technical Armament), Air Defence Weapon Control (ADWC), Logistics, Air Traffic Control (ATC), Education, Legal, Accounts, Meteorology etc. A flight cadet also earns a BSc degree in aeronautics from the Bangladesh University of Professionals.

== Wings ==
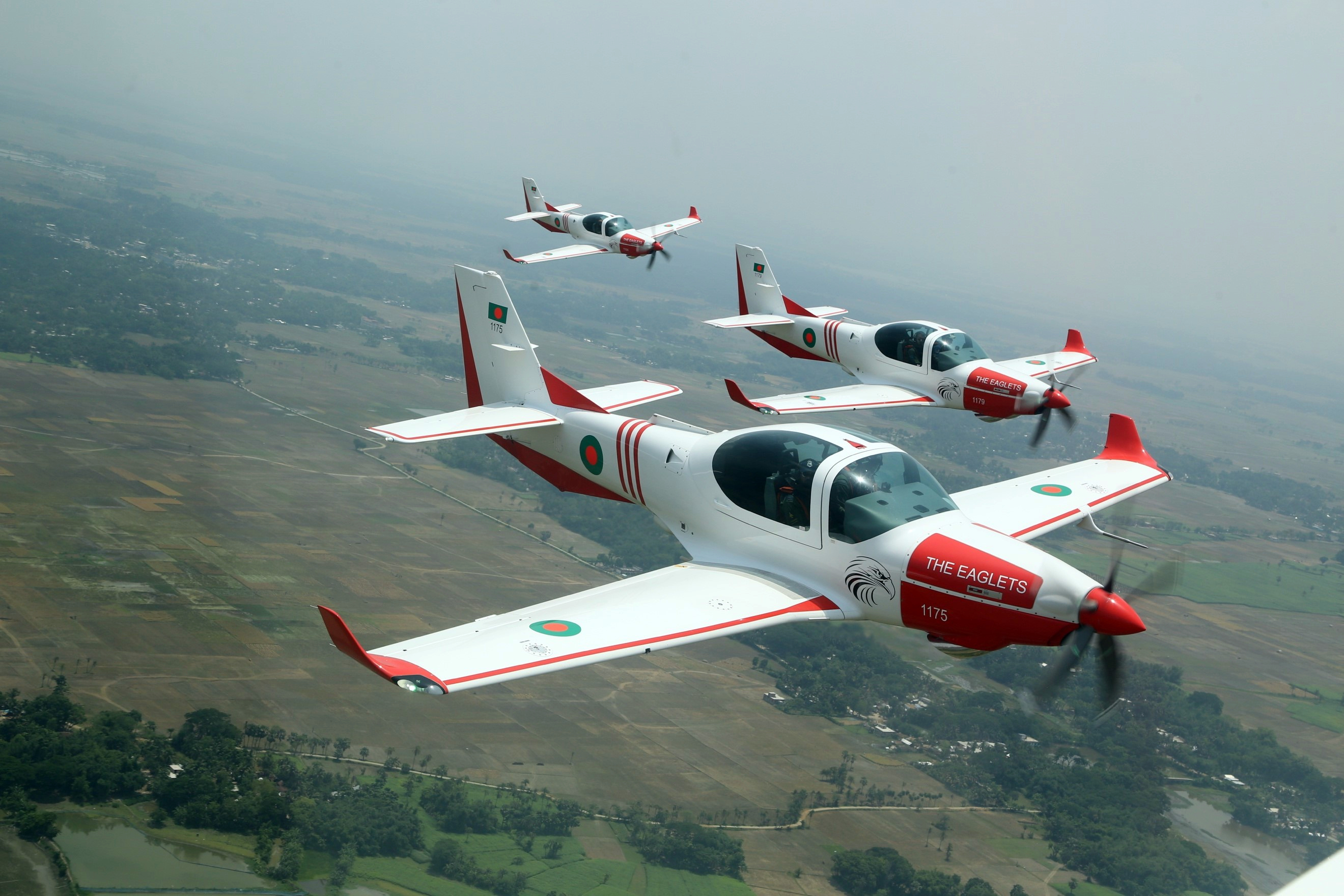
BAF's Grob G 120TP's in formation

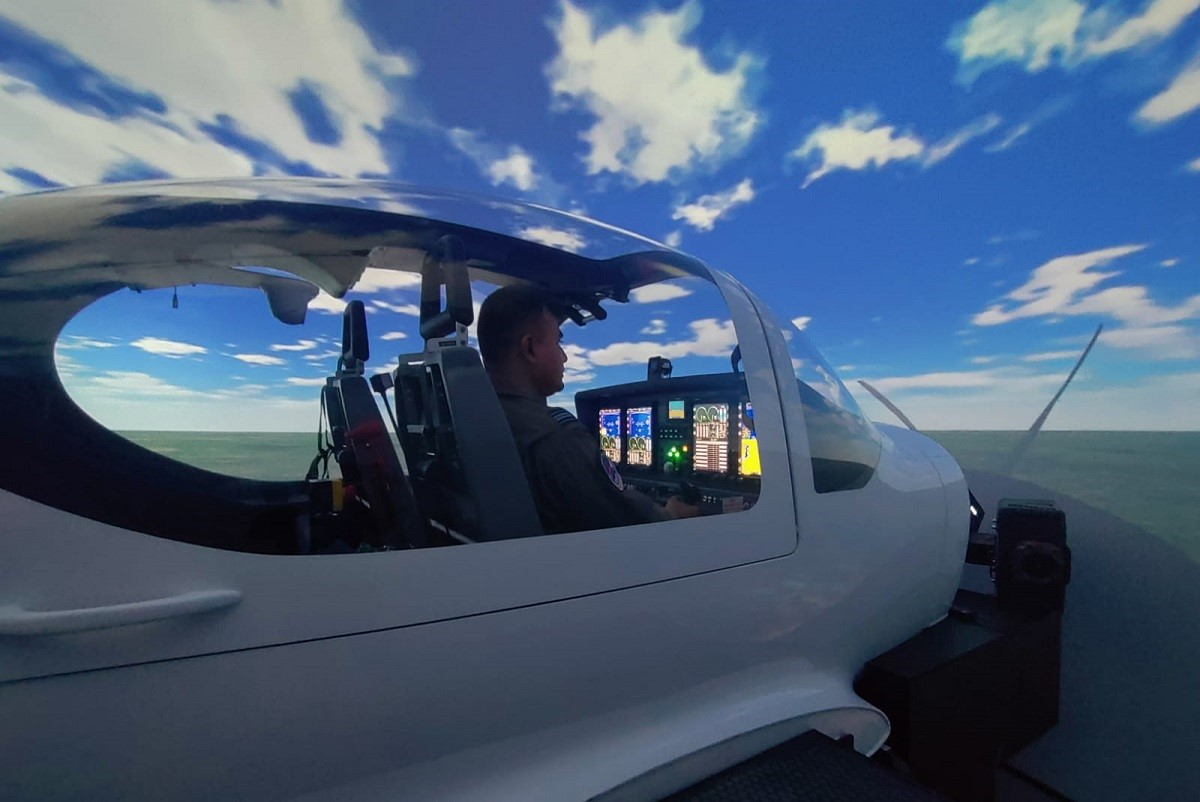
A Grob G 120TP simulator at the academy

It has total 4 wings.

1. Flying Training Wing
2. Academic Training Wing
3. Cadet's Training Wing
4. Support Wing

== Flying Training Wing ==
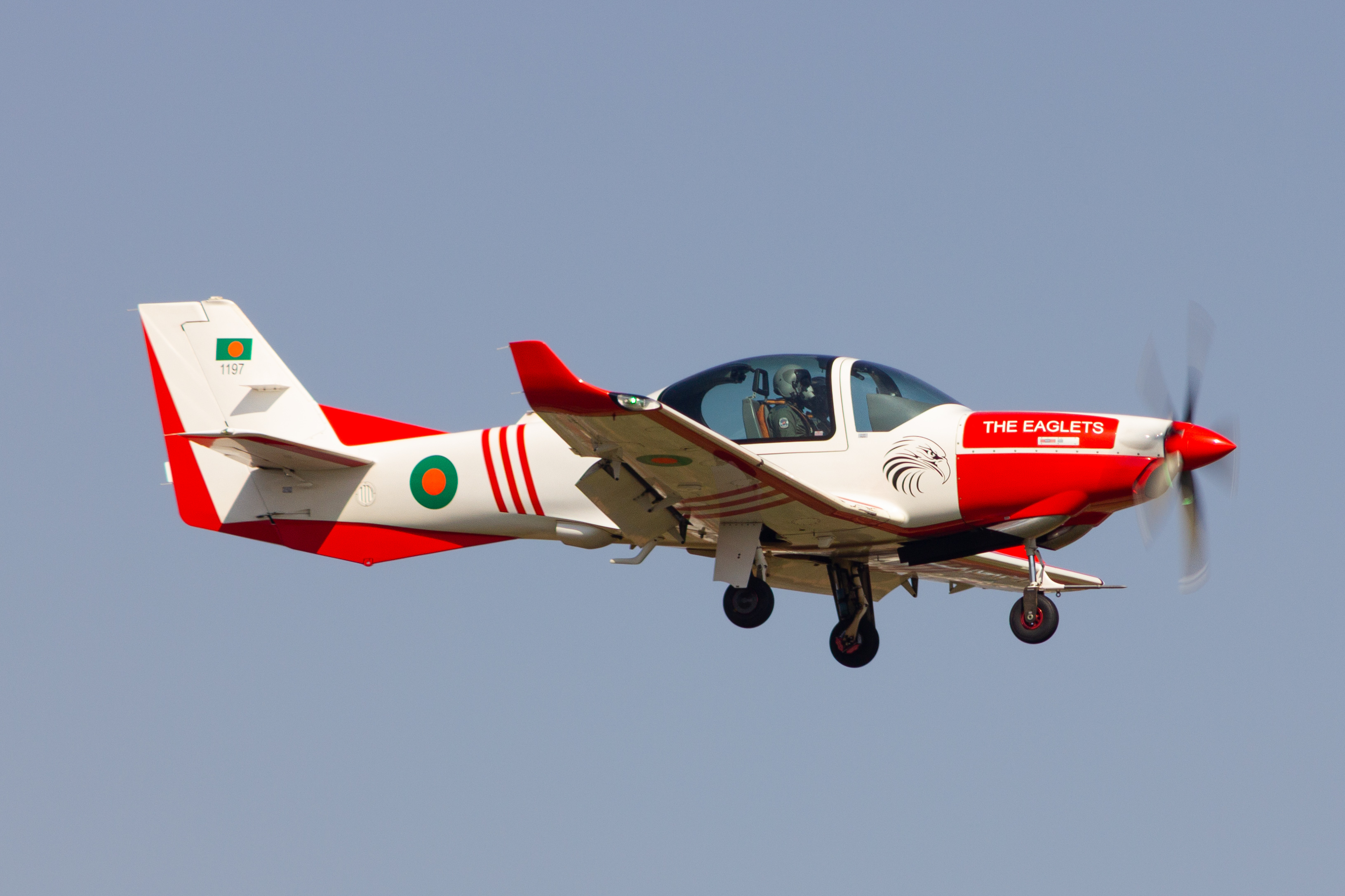
Grob G 120TP of 12 squadron "The Eaglets"

The Flying Training Wing (FTW) of BAF Academy conducts basic flying training for Officer Cadets. Under this wing there are two squadrons conduct the Basic Flying Training- 11th Squadron BAF and 12th Squadron BAF. GD(P) officer cadets of 5th and 6th semester undergo 100 hours Basic Flying Training course in 11th Squadron BAF for one year. Presently Basic Flying Training is conducted by Chinese origin PT-6 aircraft. However, recently German origin GROB G-120 TP aircraft inducted in BAF and started operating under 12th Squadron BAF. Basic Flying Training of Officer Cadets is also conducted by GROB G-120 TP aircraft under 12th Squadron BAF.

1. 11th Squadron BAF
2. 12th Squadron BAF

== Academic Training Wing ==
The Academic Training Wing (ATW) is responsible for imparting academic training to the Officer Cadets and newly commissioned officers of Bangladesh Air Force. Both regular courses under BUP and some irregular courses under BAF required are conducted at ATW.

Courses

Both regular courses under BUP and some irregular courses under BAF required are conducted at ATW. The courses conducted by ATW are:

1. . Regular Courses/ Long Courses:

....(1) BSc (Hons) in Aeronautics for 4 years ....(2) BSc in Aeronautics for 3 Years ....(3) BBA (Fin) ....(4) Level-1 of Engineering Course under MIST

1. . Irregular Courses/ Short Courses:

....(1) Special Purpose Short Service Commission (SPSSC) ....(2) Short Service Commission (SSC) ....(3) Branch Listed Permanent Commission (BLPC)

Squadrons under FTW

1. Aero Science Squadron
2. Huminities & Business Studies Squadron
3. Engineering Studies Squadron
4. Training Support Squadron

== Cadets' Training Wing (CTW) ==
The Cadets' Training Wing (CTW) of the Bangladesh Air Force Academy prepares Officer Cadets through physical, academic, and leadership training. Programs include general service training (drills, field exercises, survival, weapon handling, and athletics), development of officer-like qualities (discipline, integrity, teamwork, and communication), and leadership practice through appointments and responsibilities. CTW also conducts the Potential Flight Commander Course (PFCC) for officers assigned to supervise and assess cadets.

Squadrons under CTW

1. Bir Uttam A K Khandakar Squadron

(No 1 Squadron)

1. Bir Uttam Sultan Mahmud Squadron

(No 2 Squadron)

1. Bir Uttam Badrul Alam Squadron

(No 3 Squadron)

1. Bir Uttam Shamsul Alam Squadron

(No 4 Squadron)

== Support Wing ==
Support Wing provides all the administrative support to BAFA. It has different Flights to operate its daily activities like Personnel Flight, Finance Flight, Logistic Flight, Works Flight, UWO Flight and Civil Admin Section.

== Notable alumni ==
- Hasan Mahmood Khan, 17th Chief of Air Staff of Bangladesh

== Gallery ==
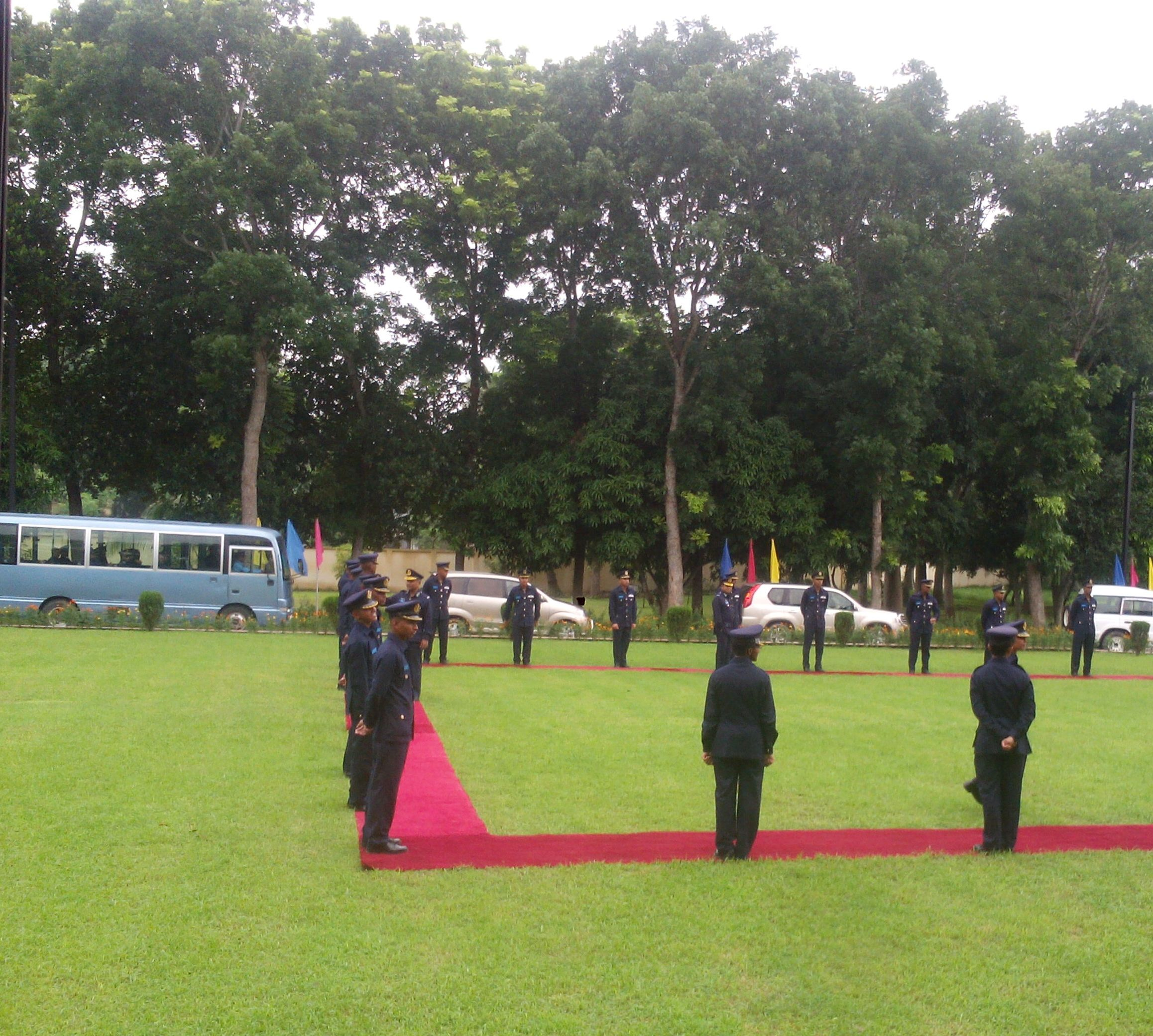
Bangladesh Air Force graduation ceremony

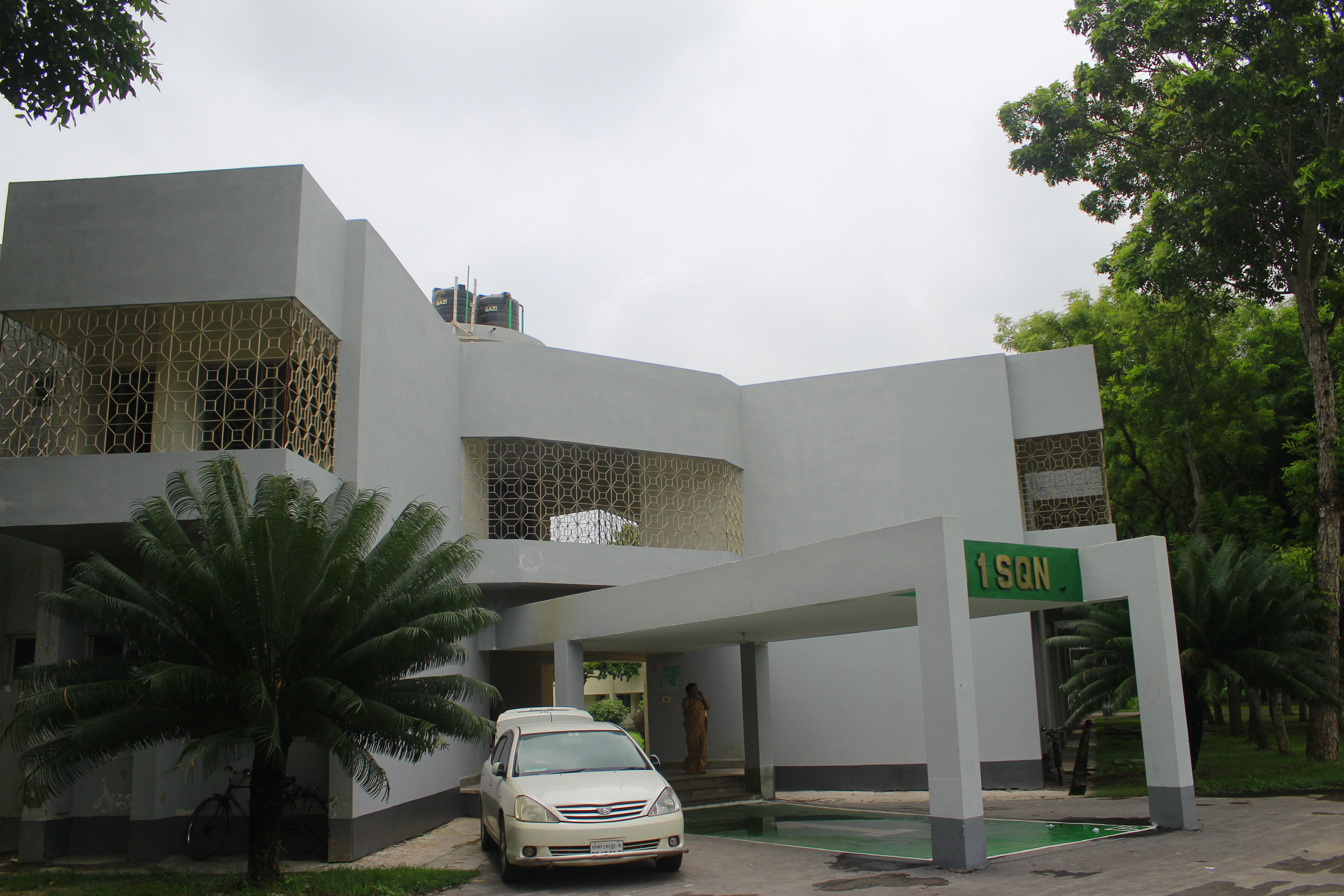
1 Squadron Bangladesh Air Force Academy

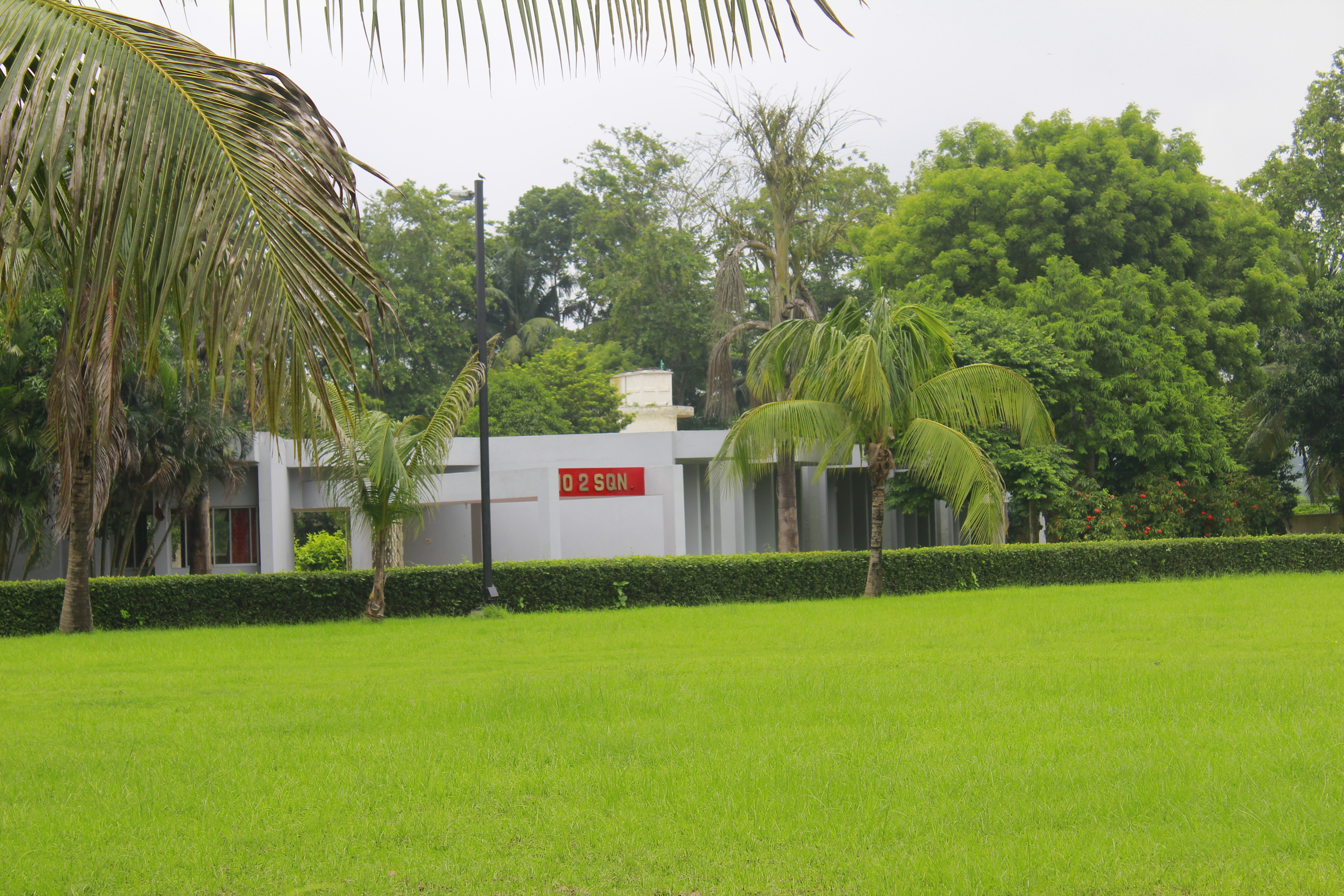
2 Squadron Bangladesh Air Force Academy

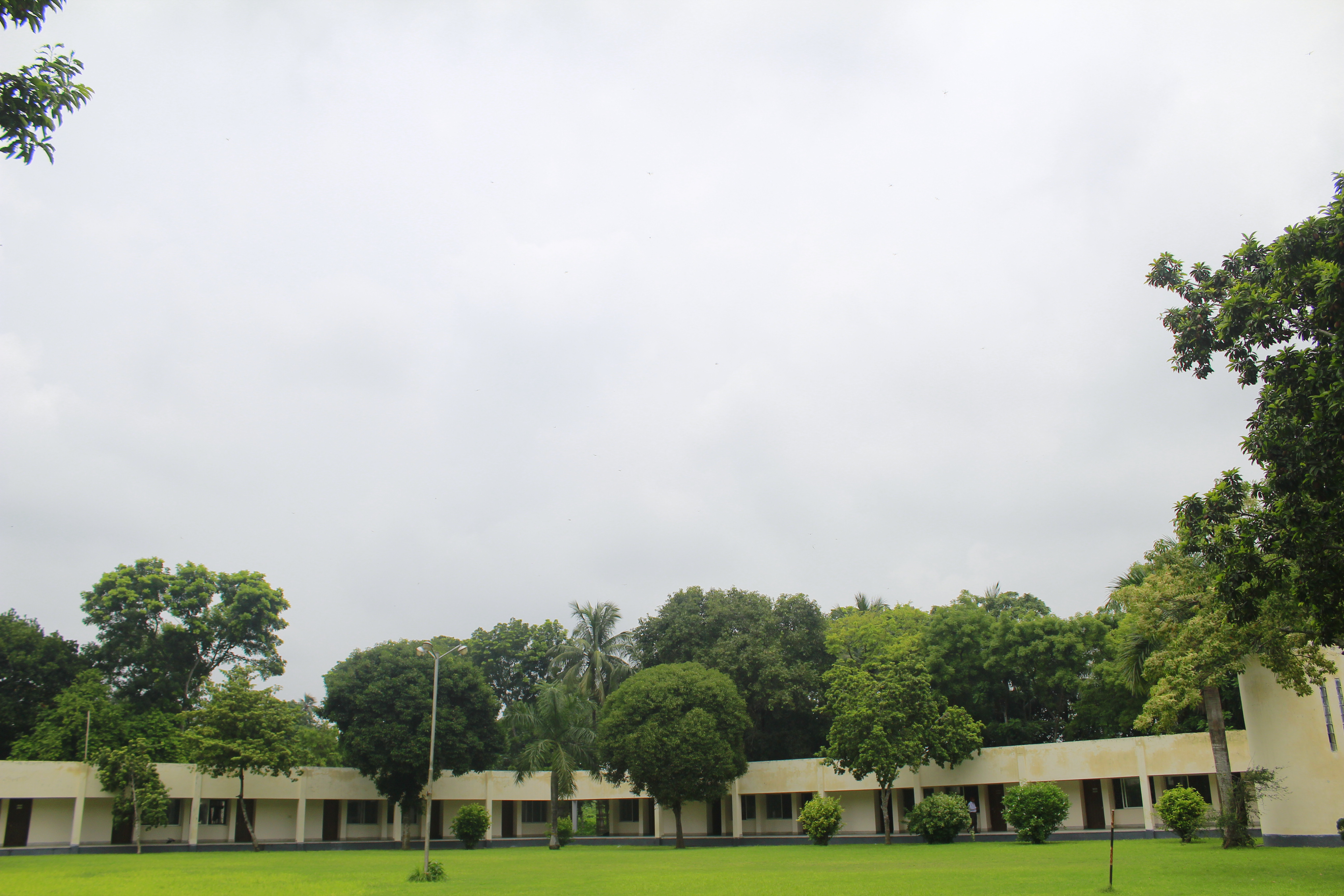
Cadets' Mess

== See also ==
- Bangladesh Military Academy
- Bangladesh Naval Academy
