= Mohammad Rafiqul Islam =

Chief of Bangladesh Air Force (1952–2026)

- মুহাম্মদ রফিকুল ইসলাম

Member of the Bangladesh Parliament for Chandpur-2
- In office 25 January 2009 – 24 January 2014
- Preceded by: Md. Nurul Huda
- Succeeded by: Mofazzal Hossain Chowdhury

10th Chief of Air Staff
- In office 2001–2002
- Preceded by: Jamal Uddin Ahmed
- Succeeded by: Fakhrul Azam

Personal details
- Born: 2 February 1952 Chandpur District, East Bengal, Dominion of Pakistan
- Died: 13 August 2026 (aged 74) Dhaka, Bangladesh
- Party: Awami League

Military service
- Allegiance: Bangladesh
- Branch/service: Bangladesh Air Force
- Rank: Air Vice Marshal

Air Vice-Marshal Mohammad Rafiqul Islam (2 February 1952 – 13 August 2026) was a Bangladeshi military officer who was chief of the Bangladesh Air Force. He was the 10th chief of the Bangladesh Air Force from 4 June 2001 to 8 April 2002. He later joined the Awami League and served as a Jatiya Sangsad member representing the Chandpur-2 constituency during 2009–2014.

Islam died in Dhaka on 13 August 2026, at the age of 74. His funeral was carried out at BAF Base Bashar in Tejgaon, Dhaka.
