= Fakhrul Azam =

Bangladeshi Air Force officer

- ফখরুল আজম

11th Chief of Air Staff
- In office 8 April 2002 – 7 April 2007
- President: Muhammad Jamiruddin Sircar (acting); Iajuddin Ahmed
- Prime Minister: Khaleda Zia; Iajuddin Ahmed (acting); Fazlul Haque (acting); Fakhruddin Ahmed (acting)
- Preceded by: Rafiqul Islam
- Succeeded by: Shah Mohammad Ziaur Rahman

Personal details
- Education: PAF College Sargodha

Military service
- Allegiance: Bangladesh
- Branch/service: Bangladesh Air Force
- Years of service: 1971–2007
- Rank: Air Vice Marshal

Fakhrul Azam, ndc, psc was the chief of air staff of the Bangladesh Air Force from 2002 to 2007. He studied in Sargodha College of the Pakistan Air Force. He was in the Tempest house (694-T). He left the institution in 1965 after completing his Senior Cambridge. He was commissioned in the Pakistan Air Force on 13 March 1971 from the 51st GD(P) Course. Fakhrul was appointed the chief of air staff of the Bangladesh Air Force on 8 April 2002 by Prime Minister Khaleda Zia.

Military offices
Preceded by Air Vice Marshal Rafiqul Islam	Chief of Air Staff; 2007 – 2012	Succeeded by Air Vice Marshal Shah Mohammad Ziaur Rahman
