= Bangladesh Aeronautical Centre =

Bangladeshi defence company

- Native name: Bengali: বাংলাদেশ বিমানবিদ্যা কেন্দ্র
- Type: State-owned company
- Industry: Aerospace, defence
- Founded: December 4, 2011; 14 years ago
- Headquarters: Kurmitola, Dhaka, Bangladesh
- Area served: Bangladesh
- Key people: Air Vice Marshal Abdullah Al Mamun (commandant)
- Products: Aircraft maintenance Helicopter maintenance Military communications Aerial navigation Defence electronics UAV systems
- Owner: Bangladesh Ministry of Defence
- Website: baf.mil.bd

The Bangladesh Aeronautical Center (Bengali: বাংলাদেশ বিমানবিদ্যা কেন্দ্র), or BAC, is a Bangladeshi state-owned major defense contractor and aerospace, arms, defense and advanced technology company headquartered in Kurmitola, Dhaka. It was formed by the Ministry of Defence in 2011, and is managed by the Bangladesh Air Force.

BAC is among the largest defense contractors in aerospace, military support, and security provider for the Bangladesh military.

The corporation is primarily involved in the design, modernization, integration, and assembly of aircraft and avionics systems for the Bangladesh military. Mainly focusing on avionics, aviation, and high-tech military technologies for the Air Force, BAC also operates a division for development and maintenance of systems for the Army and Navy such as radar, unmanned aerial vehicle and other defense systems. The corporation is strictly restricted from exporting any technologies or products without consent from the Ministry of Defence and Bangladesh Air Force.

== Operations ==
The center was established in 2011 with an aim to establish indigenous maintenance facilities for all aircraft of the Bangladesh Air Force. As per Forces Readiness Goal 2030, the goal was to maintain the maximum number of aircraft in service, and minimize dependency on foreign suppliers.

=== 214 Maintenance, Repairing and Overhauling Unit ===
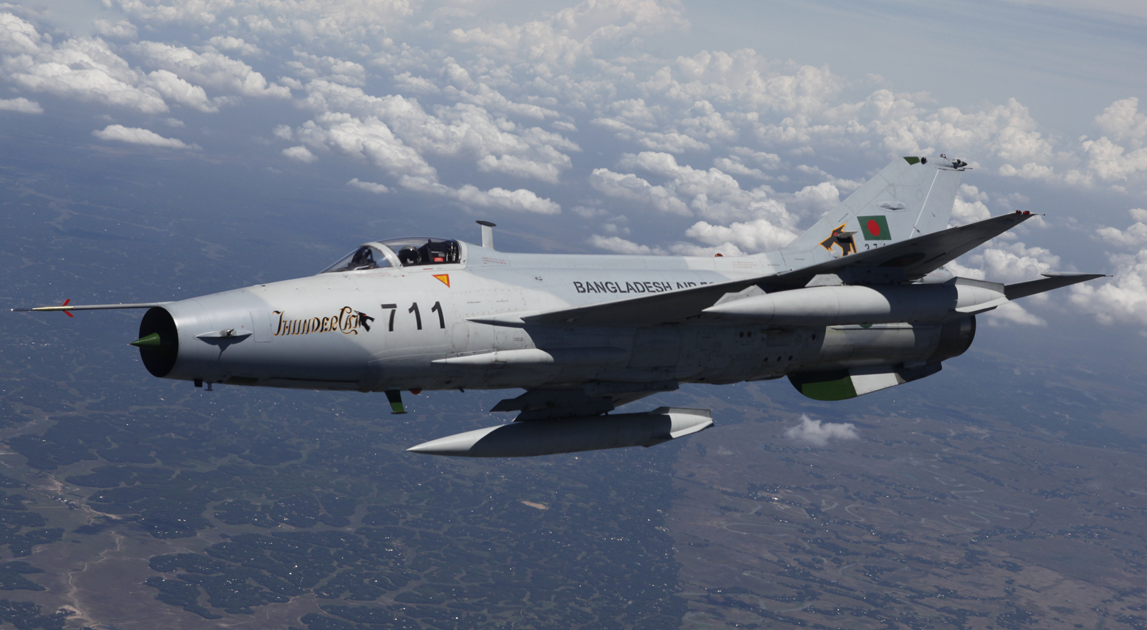
A Chengdu F-7BGI: the F-7s are maintained at the BAC.

214 Maintenance, Repairing and Overhauling (MRO) Unit is primarily dedicated towards overhauling and maintenance of the Chinese Chengdu F-7 fighter jets in service with the Bangladesh Air Force (BAF). The unit achieved capability of overhauling and manufacturing parts for the aircraft in 2018. Currently, Bangladesh Air Force boasts 57 F-7 aircraft in its inventory, 36 of them in service. Implementation of F-7 overhauling factory minimized approximately 30 to 40 percent of cost on overhauling and maintenance, while shortening overhauling period from a year to 8 months.

=== Grob G 120TP Workshop ===
In 2021, Outgoing Chief of Air Staff Masihuzzaman Serniabat disclosed a deal between BAF and Grob Aircraft for 24 Grob G 120TP basic trainer. During his speech, he revealed that as per contract, the German manufacturer will set up Composite Material Repair Workshop and Propeller Repair Workshop. The workshops will be designed to maintain turboprop aircraft in BAF inventory, including ones with Rolls Royce turboprop engines.

== Indigenous manufacturing ==
=== Bengal Basic Trainer ===
The BBT-1, BBT-2 made by BAC, BBT-2, a military basic trainer and light attack aircraft, is the result of a collaboration between Bangladesh Aeronautical Centre (BAC) and Aermacchi, a subsidiary of Leonardo. Sporting a retractable tricycle landing gear and low wing arrangement, this modern aircraft is powered by a Rolls-Royce M250 340 kW turboprop engine, achieving a maximum speed of 354 km/h, a range of 1,000 km, and a service ceiling of approximately 6,500 m.

With a two-person crew capacity, the BBT-2 can also accommodate two additional passengers or a stretcher with a patient during emergencies. Fitted with advanced avionics and safety gear from US and European suppliers, such as Honeywell, Garmin, and Martin-Baker, this side-by-side seat military trainer is undergoing test flights.

The inaugural test flight of the BBT-2 took place in November 2023.
