= Airmen Training Institution =

Bangladesh Air Force Training Institution

Airmen Training Institute
- বিমানসেনা প্রশিক্ষণ প্রতিষ্ঠান
- Crest of Airmen Training Institute
- Other name: ATI
- Motto: জ্ঞান শৃঙ্খলা দেশপ্রেম
- Motto in English: Discipline and Patriotism Through Knowledge
- Type: Air Force Training Centre
- Established: 26 February 2020; 6 years ago
- Affiliations: Bangladesh Air Force
- Commandant: Air Commodore Raahim Mahmood, BPP, fawc, psc, GD(P)
- Location: Air Force Base Zahurul Haque at Chattogram, Bangladesh
- Website: ati.baf.mil.bd

Airmen Training Institute (ATI) (Bengali: বিমানসেনা প্রশিক্ষণ প্রতিষ্ঠান) is a training institution of the Bangladesh Air Force which provides basic and advanced trade training to all airmen of the Bangladesh Air Force. The Airmen Training Institution (ATI) is located in the district town of Chattogram at Air Force Base Zahurul Haque. An air officer (e.g. an Air Commodore) serves as its Commandant.

After successful completion of Recruits Training & PTAT Training Trainees of different trade undergo Trade Training Basic (TTB) and Trade Training Advance (TTA). After completion of advance training (TTA) Trainees of different technical trade receive Diploma certificate in respective technology which is recognized as equivalent to the DIPLOMA in ENGINEERING by the Bangladesh Technical Education Board, Dhaka vide Notification No- BTEB/Ka/85/643 dated 16 September 1985.

Duration of Diploma is Three Years.

Issued Diploma by ATI, BAF

1. Airframe Technology
2. Aero Engine Technology
3. Electrical & Instrument Technology
4. Radio Technology
5. Armament Technology
6. General Engineering Technology
7. Ground Signalling Technology

From 2021 (Entry No-48) ATI also started CAAB Part-66 Basic course in B1.1, B1.2, B1.3 & B2 Category.

B1.1 - Aeroplane Turbine

B1.2 - Aeroplane Piston

B1.3 - Helicopter Turbine

B2 - Avionics

Trainees of Airframe Fitter, Engine Fitter, Electric & Instrument Fitter

undergone with B1.1, B1.2 & B1.3 (Aerospace) Category

And Trainees of Radio Fitter

undergone with B2 (Avionics) Category

Trainee who has passed in Module examination they also Receive a Certificate of Recognition.
