= Enamul Bari =

Bangladesh Air Force officer

Muhammad Enamul Bari
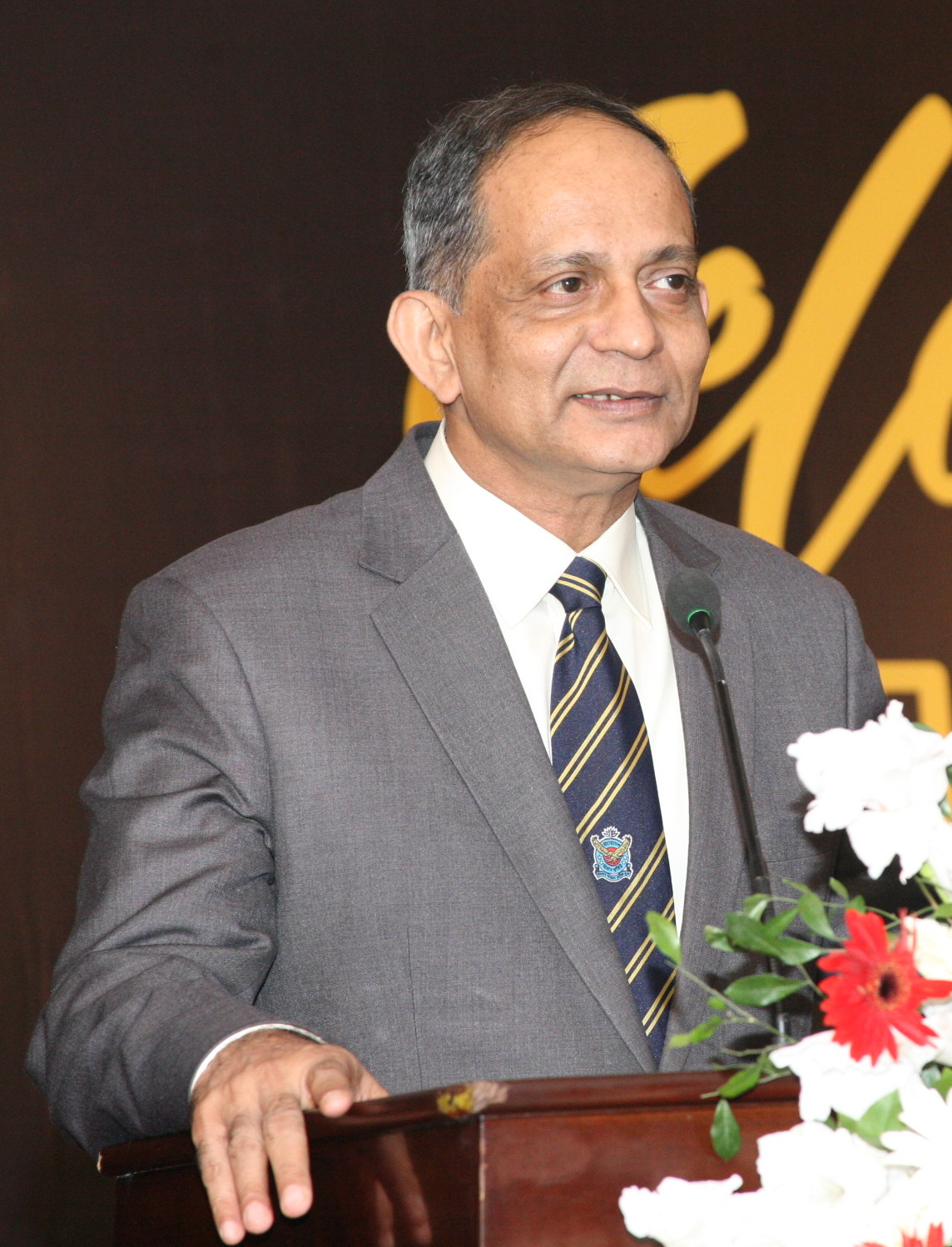
- Bari in 2017

13th Chief of Air Staff
- In office 13 June 2012 – 12 June 2015
- President: Zillur Rahman; Abdul Hamid
- Prime Minister: Sheikh Hasina
- Preceded by: Shah Mohammad Ziaur Rahman
- Succeeded by: Abu Esrar

Military service
- Allegiance: Bangladesh
- Branch/service: Bangladesh Air Force
- Years of service: 1981-2015
- Rank: Air Marshal
- Unit: No. 1 Squadron
- Commands: CO of No. 21 Squadron; CO of No. 25 Squadron; Base Commander of BAF Base Matiur Rahman; Base Commander of BAF Base Zahurul Haq; AOC of BAF Base Matiur Rahman; ACAS (Operation & Training) at Air Headquarters; ACAS (Administration) at Air Headquarters; Chairman of BBA

Muhammad Enamul Bari BBP, ndu, psc is a former three star air officer who served as the 13th chief of air staff of the Bangladesh Air Force. He also served as the chairman of Biman Bangladesh Airlines, the flag carrier of Bangladesh. He was replaced by Sajjadul Hassan as the chairperson of Bangladesh Biman in 2019.

He joined the Bangladesh Air Force as a flight cadet on September 19, 1978, and was commissioned into the General Duties (Pilot) branch on February 1, 1981, along with Abu Esrar, who became air chief in June 2015.

Military offices
Preceded by Air Marshal Shah Mohammad Ziaur Rahman	Chief of Air Staff; 2012 – 2015	Succeeded by Air Marshal Abu Esrar
