= Command and Staff Training Institute =

Defense college in Bangladesh

Command and Staff Training Institute (CSTI)
- Motto: প্রতিভা প্রশিক্ষণ প্রগতি
- Motto in English: Excellence in attaining talent through training
- Type: Military college
- Established: 12 July 1976
- Officer Commanding: Group Captain Abdullah Al Farooq
- Location: BAF Base Cox’s Bazar, Cox’s Bazar, Bangladesh
- Website: csti.baf.mil.bd

Command and Staff Training Institute (CSTI) is a Bangladeshi government owned defense college that provides training to military officers specially air force officers. BAF established Junior Command and Staff School (JCSS) on 12 July 1976 to prepare effective, skilled and professional commanders. The school was tasked to conduct Junior Command and Staff Course (JCSC) for the mid-level officers. The new institute named ‘Command and Staff Training Institute (CSTI)’ was inaugurated on 28 April 1983. Group Captain Abdullah Al Farooq is the current commander of CSTI.

== Notable alumni ==
- Air Marshal Udeni Rajapaksa - Commander of the Air Force of Sri lanka
