= BAF Base Bir Uttom A. K. Khandker =

Air base in Dhaka, Bangladesh

BAF Base A. K. Khandker বিএএফ ঘাঁটি একে খন্দকার

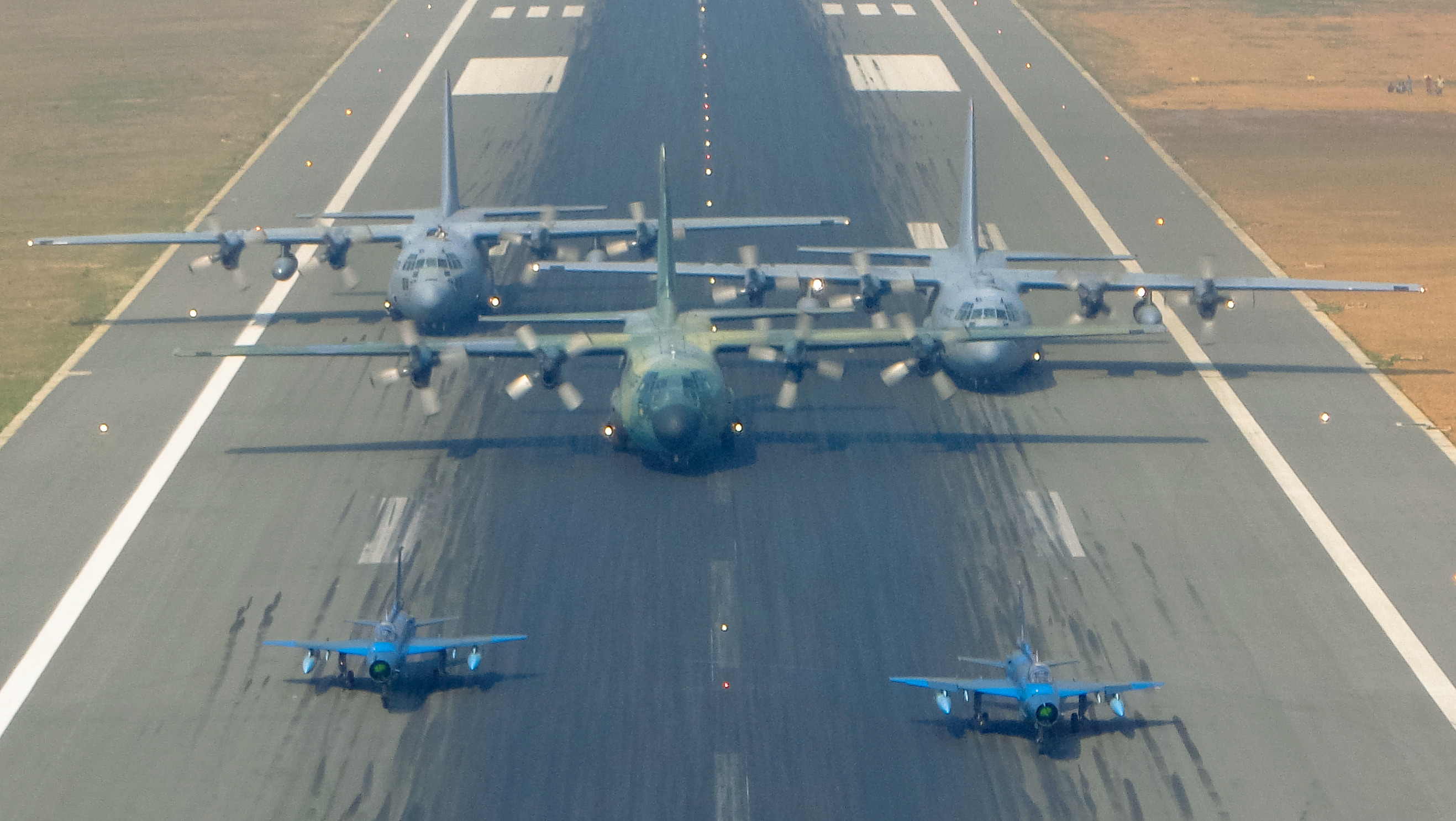
- Runway of the airbase
- IATA: none; ICAO: VBBBD

Summary
- Airport type: Military
- Operator: Bangladesh Air Force
- Location: Kurmitola, Dhaka, Bangladesh
- Opened: 9 April 2013; 13 years ago
- Coordinates: 23.8369473°N 90.3986193°E

Map
- Location in Bangladesh BAF Base BU AK Khandker (Dhaka division) BAF Base BU AK Khandker (Bangladesh)

Runways
| Direction | Length | | Surface |
| Direction | ft | m | Surface |
|---|---|---|---|
| 14/32 | 11,500 | 3,505 | Asphalt |

BAF Base Bir Uttom A. K. Khandker, (commonly known as BAF Base Kurmitola; formerly known as BAF Base Bangabandhu) is one of nine Bangladesh Air Force bases located at Kurmitola, Dhaka in Bangladesh. It is situated near Hazrat Shahjalal International Airport. The base is named after former Chief of Air Staff A. K. Khandker.

== History ==
In 1941, during the Second World War, the British government built a landing strip at Kurmitola, several kilometres north of Tejgaon, as a spare landing strip for the Tejgaon Airport, which at the time was a military airport, to operate warplanes towards the war fields of Kohima (then in Assam) and Burmese war theatres. In 1981, the landing strip was converted into an international airport. At the same area, a new airbase was built and inaugurated on 9 April 2013 with the name BAF Base Bangabandhu, after Bangabandhu Sheikh Mujibur Rahman, the first President of Bangladesh and then prime minister Sheikh Hasina's father. On 10 December 2014, a jet trainer named Hongdu K-8W was included to the airbase. On 4 December 2016, it was granted national standard by the third Hasina ministry. On 9 March 2025, the base was renamed BAF Base Bir Uttom A. K. Khandker, after A. K. Khandker, the first Chief of Air Staff of Bangladesh Air Force and Deputy Chief of Staff of Mukti Bahini, by the interim government.

== Accidents and incidents ==
On 21 July 2025, a Chengdu FT-7BGI trainer jet crashed into the Milestone College campus while attempting to land at the airbase. 35 people, including the pilot, were killed as a result of the crash. 173 others suffered injuries from the crash.
