= BAF Base Cox's Bazar =

Air base in Cox's Bazar, Bangladesh

BAF Base Cox's Bazar বিএএফ ঘাঁটি কক্সবাজার

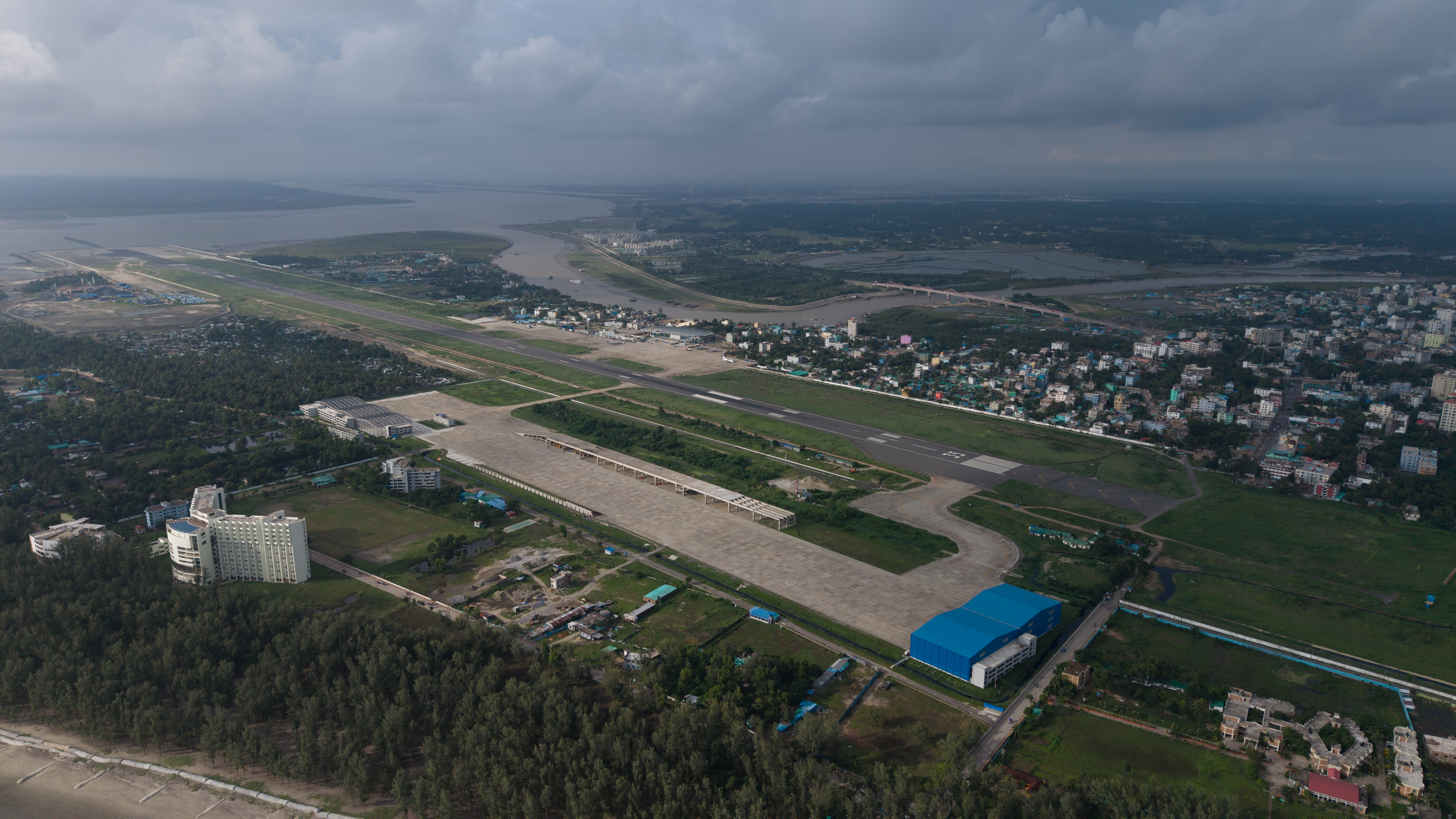
- IATA: none; ICAO: VBCX

Summary
- Airport type: Military
- Operator: Bangladesh Air Force
- Location: Cox's Bazar, Chittagong Division, Bangladesh
- Opened: 3 April 2011; 15 years ago
- Coordinates: 21.4486°N 91.9634°E

Map
- Location in Bangladesh BAF Base Cox's Bazar (Bangladesh)

Runways
| Direction | Length | | Surface |
| Direction | ft | m | Surface |
|---|---|---|---|
| 17/35 | 10,700 | 3,200 | Asphalt |

BAF Base Cox's Bazar is a Bangladeshi Air Force base located at Cox's Bazar in Bangladesh. It is situated near the Cox's Bazar Airport.

== History ==
On 27 December 2010, Sheikh Hasina, who was prime minister of the country at that time, informed that the government would start the construction of an airbase in Cox's Bazar soon to protect the country's maritime boundary and military establishments in the city. The airbase was inaugurated by her on 3 April 2011. A YLC-6 Radar was added to its radar section on 11 November 2015.

On 18 December 2019, its name was changed to BAF Base Sheikh Hasina. On 2 December 2021, the official name was changed to BAF Base Cox's Bazar. During Cyclone Sitrang in 2022, the air base was used as a shelter for flood victims in the city. A disturbance on the base in February 2025 resulted in one death and several injuries.
