= Chief of Air Staff (Bangladesh) =

Head of the Bangladesh Air Force

- বিমান বাহিনী প্রধান
- Emblem

- Flag of the Chief of Air Staff

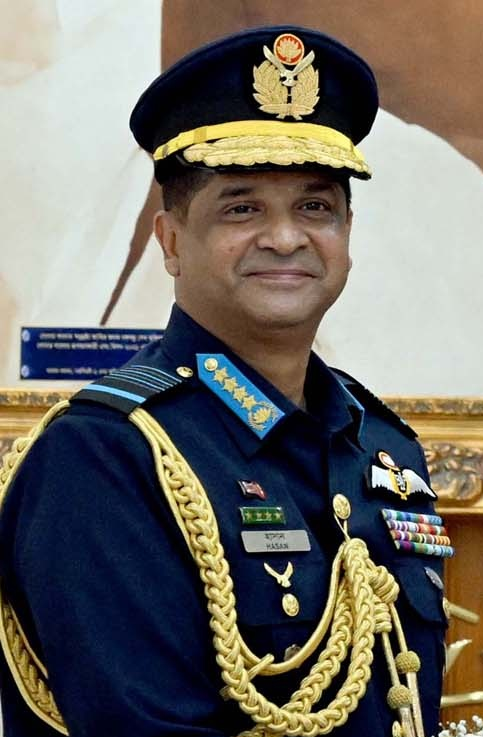
- Incumbent; Air Chief Marshal Hasan Mahmood Khan since 12 June 2024
- Bangladesh Air Force
- Type: Bangladesh Air Force service chief
- Abbreviation: COAS
- Member of: National Committee on Security Affairs
- Reports to: President
- Residence: Air House, Dhaka Cantonment
- Seat: Air Force Headquarters, Dhaka Cantonment, Dhaka
- Appointer: The Prime Minister with President advice and consent
- Term length: 3 years,
- Constituting instrument: Air Force Act, 1953 of (Act No. VI of 1953)
- Formation: 7 April 1972; 54 years ago
- First holder: Air Vice Marshal A. K. Khandker
- Salary: ৳160000 (US$1,300) per month (incl. allowances)
- Website: Official website

The Chief of Air Staff (abbreviated as COAS) (Bengali: বিমান বাহিনী প্রধান, romanized: Bimān bāhinī prôdhān) is the professional head and highest-ranking commissioned officer of the Bangladesh Air Force. The Chief of Air Staff is responsible for the overall command, administration, training, and operational readiness of the air force, and serves as the principal air adviser to the Government of Bangladesh on matters of air defence and aerospace security.

The office is held by an officer with the rank of Air Chief Marshal and is appointed by the President of Bangladesh on the advice of the Prime Minister of Bangladesh. The Chief of Air Staff is a senior member of the Armed Forces Division and plays a key role in safeguarding national airspace, supporting joint military operations, disaster response, and participation in international peacekeeping and humanitarian missions. Prior to 2016, from 2007 the appointment was held by an Air Marshal (three-star air officer) and from 1972 to 2007 COAS's rank was Air Vice Marshal.

== List of Chiefs of Air Staff ==
No.	Portrait	Chief of Air Staff	Took office	Left office	Time in office	Ref.
1	Abdul Karim KhandkerBU, psa	Air Vice Marshal; Abdul Karim Khandker; BU, psa (1930–2025)	April 7, 1972	October 15, 1975	3 years, 191 days	–
2	M. G. TawabSJ, SBT, psa	Air Vice Marshal; M. G. Tawab; SJ, SBT, psa (1930–1999)	October 15, 1975	April 30, 1976	198 days	–
3	Khademul BasharBU, TBT	Air Vice Marshal; Khademul Bashar; BU, TBT (1935–1976)	May 1, 1976	September 1, 1976 †	123 days	–
4	A. G. MahmudTBT, psa	Air Vice Marshal; A. G. Mahmud; TBT, psa (born 1934)	September 5, 1976	December 8, 1977	1 year, 94 days	–
5	Sadruddin Mohammad HossainBP	Air Vice Marshal; Sadruddin Mohammad Hossain; BP (born 1941)	December 9, 1977	July 22, 1981	3 years, 225 days	–
6	Sultan MahmudBU	Air Vice Marshal; Sultan Mahmud; BU (1944–2023)	July 23, 1981	July 22, 1987	5 years, 364 days	–
7	Momtaz Uddin Ahmedpsc	Air Vice Marshal; Momtaz Uddin Ahmed psc (1941–2019)	July 23, 1987	June 4, 1991	3 years, 316 days	–
8	Altaf Hossain Chowdhuryndu, psc	Air Vice Marshal; Altaf Hossain Chowdhury ndu, psc (born 1941)	June 4, 1991	June 3, 1995	3 years, 364 days	–
9	Jamal Uddin Ahmedndc, bems, psc	Air Marshal; Jamal Uddin Ahmed ndc, bems, psc (born 1943)	June 4, 1995	June 3, 2001	5 years, 364 days	–
10	Mohammad Rafiqul Islamndu, psc	Air Vice Marshal; Mohammad Rafiqul Islam ndu, psc (1952–2026)	June 4, 2001	April 8, 2002	308 days	–
11	Fakhrul Azamndc, psc	Air Vice Marshal; Fakhrul Azam ndc, psc	April 8, 2002	April 7, 2007	4 years, 364 days	–
12	Shah Mohammad Ziaur Rahmanndc, fawc, psc	Air Marshal; Shah Mohammad Ziaur Rahman ndc, fawc, psc (born 1955)	April 8, 2007	June 12, 2012	5 years, 66 days	–
13	Muhammad Enamul BariBBP, ndu, psc	Air Marshal; Muhammad Enamul Bari; BBP, ndu, psc	June 13, 2012	June 12, 2015	2 years, 364 days	–
14	Abu EsrarBBP, ndc, acsc	Air Chief Marshal; Abu Esrar; BBP, ndc, acsc (born 1961)	June 12, 2015	June 12, 2018	3 years, 0 days	–
15	Masihuzzaman SerniabatBBP, OSP, ndu, psc	Air Chief Marshal; Masihuzzaman Serniabat; BBP, OSP, ndu, psc (born 1962)	June 12, 2018	June 12, 2021	3 years, 0 days	–
16	Shaikh Abdul HannanBBP, BUP, nswc, fawc, psc	Air Chief Marshal; Shaikh Abdul Hannan; BBP, BUP, nswc, fawc, psc (born 1963)	June 12, 2021	June 11, 2024	2 years, 365 days	
17	Hasan Mahmood KhanBBP, OSP, GUP, nswc, psc	Air Chief Marshal; Hasan Mahmood Khan; BBP, OSP, GUP, nswc, psc (born 1966)	June 12, 2024	Incumbent	2 years, 87 days	

== See also ==
- List of serving air marshals of the Bangladesh Air Force
- Chief of Army Staff (Bangladesh)
- Chief of Naval Staff (Bangladesh)
- Awards and decorations of the Bangladesh Armed Forces
