= Air officer =

Officer rank in air forces of Commonwealth countries

An RAF air officer's shoulder board

An air officer is an air force officer of the rank of air commodore or higher. Such officers may be termed "officers of air rank". While the term originated in the Royal Air Force, air officers are also to be found in many Commonwealth nations who have a similar rank structure to the RAF.

Air officers holding command appointments receive the title Air Officer Commanding (AOC), whereas air officers holding commander-in-chief positions are titled as Air Officer Commanding-in-Chief (AOC-in-C).

== Air officer ranks ==
The air officer ranks are as follows:

Marshal of the Air Force
Air chief marshal
Air marshal
Air vice-marshal
Air commodore

== National usage ==
The air officer terminology is currently used by the following air forces:

- Bangladesh Air Force
- Indian Air Force
- Namibian Air Force
- Nigerian Air Force
- Pakistan Air Force
- Sri Lanka Air Force
- Royal Air Force
- Royal Australian Air Force
- Royal New Zealand Air Force
- Air Force of Zimbabwe

=== British usage ===
In the British Armed Forces, where the term originated, an air officer is equivalent in concept to flag officer and general officer in the Royal Navy and Army respectively. Specifically, while the Army uses General Officer Commanding (GOC), the Air Force uses Air Officer Commanding (AOC) to designate the senior officer in a formation.

Note, however, that in the British Armed Forces, while an air commodore is an air officer, their Royal Navy equivalent (commodore) is not considered a flag officer, nor is the British Army or Royal Marines equivalent (brigadier) considered a general officer. In 1919 when the RAF introduced its own air officer ranks, the preceding RAF and equivalent army rank was brigadier-general, which was a general officer rank until its abolition in 1922. In some other countries — most notably the armed forces of the United States — Army, Air Force and Marine Corps one-star officers are considered to be general officers, and one-star officers of the Navy and Coast Guard are considered to be flag officers.

There are multiple air officer command appointments. Additionally the RAF maintains two home country air officer appointments. These are Air Officer Scotland and the Air Officer for Wales.

On ceremonial occasions, many RAF air officers are entitled to wear embellished shoulder boards and the gold and blue sash. This applies to all officers at or above the rank of air vice-marshal and holders of the following air commodore posts:

- Commandant of the Royal Air Force College Cranwell
- Air Officer Scotland
- Air Officer Northern Ireland
- Air Officer Wales

With the exception of marshals of the RAF, the embellished shoulder boards feature the golden air officers' eagle and wreath device surmounted by a lion statant guardant. For marshals of the RAF, the embellished shoulder boards display the air officer's eagle and wreath, two crossed marshal's batons and, since the coronation of Queen Elizabeth II, the St Edward's Crown representing royal authority. Prior to 1953, the Tudor Crown (sometimes called the King's Crown) was used.
