= Caretaker government of Fakhruddin Ahmed =

Period of the Government of Bangladesh from 2007 to 2009

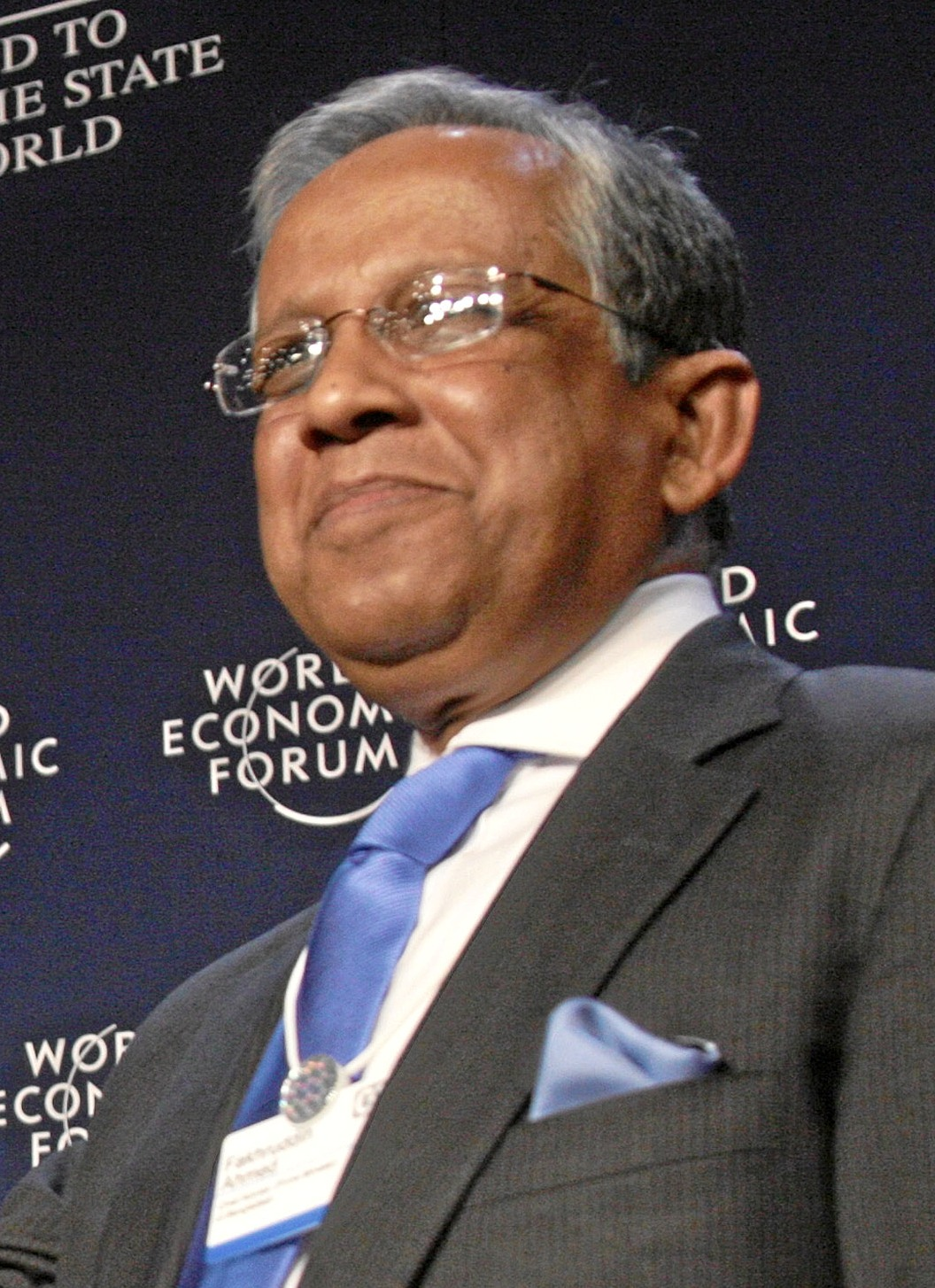
- Ahmed at the World Economic Forum (2008)
- Caretaker government of Fakhruddin Ahmed; 12 January 2007 – 6 January 2009
- President: Iajuddin Ahmed
- Premier: Fakhruddin Ahmed
- Cabinet: Fakhruddin Ahmed ministry
- Party: Independent
- Nominated by: Bangladesh Armed Forces
- Appointed by: Iajuddin Ahmed
- Seat: Jamuna State Guest House

The caretaker government of Fakhruddin Ahmed was the non-partisan interim government of Bangladesh headed by Chief Adviser Fakhruddin Ahmed from 12 January 2007 to 6 January 2009. It came to office during a political crisis surrounding the scheduled January 2007 general election, after President Iajuddin Ahmed declared a state of emergency, postponed the election, and resigned as Chief Adviser of the caretaker government. The new administration was backed by the Bangladesh military and was tasked with restoring political stability, implementing institutional reforms, and preparing for a credible parliamentary election.

The government, commonly associated in Bangladesh with the term "1/11", referring to the political changeover of 11 January 2007, operated under a state of emergency for most of its tenure. Its principal initiatives included electoral and voter-registration reforms, an anti-corruption campaign, separation of the judiciary from the executive, and measures intended to stabilize the economy. At the same time, the administration faced criticism over restrictions on political activity and civil liberties, the detention of leading political figures, and the extent of military influence over the government.

The government eventually organized the 2008 Bangladeshi general election, which was held on 29 December 2008. The election was generally regarded by international observers as credible and peaceful, and Sheikh Hasina was sworn in as Prime Minister on 6 January 2009, bringing the caretaker administration to an end.

== Background ==
In late 2006, Bangladesh experienced widespread political unrest as the term of the Bangladesh Nationalist Party (BNP) government led by Prime Minister Khaleda Zia came to an end. The opposition Awami League, led by Sheikh Hasina, accused the BNP government of attempting to influence the Election Commission and the caretaker government in preparation for the scheduled January 2007 election. Protests, strikes and violence disrupted political and economic activity.

The political crisis intensified in January 2007. On 11 January, President Iajuddin Ahmed declared a state of emergency, postponed the scheduled parliamentary election and resigned as Chief Adviser of the caretaker government. He also imposed a curfew from 11 p.m. to 5 a.m.

The Economist described the events surrounding the change of government as a form of coup d'état. Contemporary reporting also indicated substantial pressure from the military leadership during the political transition.

== Inauguration ==
After Iajuddin Ahmed resigned as Chief Adviser, Justice Fazlul Haque, the senior-ranking adviser in the caretaker government, briefly assumed the position on an interim basis.

On 12 January 2007, Fakhruddin Ahmed, a former governor of Bangladesh Bank and former World Bank official, was sworn in as Chief Adviser of the caretaker government. President Iajuddin Ahmed administered the oath at Bangabhaban. Diplomats, representatives of civil society, business leaders and political figures attended the ceremony.

Ahmed appointed five advisers on 13 January to begin forming the new administration. Following his appointment, the curfew imposed during the political crisis was lifted. The state of emergency, however, remained in force and imposed restrictions on political activity, public gatherings and certain civil liberties.

== Domestic affairs ==
=== State of emergency ===
Gazette regarding the State of emergency

The caretaker government operated under the state of emergency declared on 11 January 2007. Emergency regulations restricted political activity and public gatherings and placed limitations on certain forms of political expression.

The government argued that the emergency measures were necessary to restore law and order and create conditions for a credible election. Human rights organizations and political observers, however, criticized the restrictions and raised concerns about their effects on freedom of expression, political participation and due process.

The emergency remained in force through most of the government's tenure. It was lifted on 17 December 2008, shortly before the parliamentary election.

=== Anti-corruption campaign ===
One of the defining features of the caretaker government was its campaign against corruption. Beginning in 2007, authorities brought corruption and other criminal charges against numerous politicians, civil servants and business figures, including leading figures associated with both the BNP and Awami League.

Among those targeted were Tarique Rahman and Arafat Rahman, sons of former president Ziaur Rahman and former prime minister Khaleda Zia. Charges were also brought against Khaleda Zia and Sheikh Hasina.

The campaign initially received significant public support, particularly among people dissatisfied with corruption in government and political institutions. At the same time, critics questioned whether some of the prosecutions were politically motivated and whether the emergency environment provided adequate safeguards for due process.

=== Political restrictions and the "Minus Two" controversy ===
In 2007, the caretaker government temporarily restricted political activity and attempted to alter the political environment before the eventual election. Reports emerged that the administration sought to persuade both Khaleda Zia and Sheikh Hasina to leave the country or otherwise withdraw from active politics.

The government subsequently changed course. On 26 April 2007, it allowed Sheikh Hasina to return to Bangladesh and permitted the two major political leaders to resume political activities.

The government's actions became associated with the so-called "Minus Two" formula, an alleged strategy to remove both Hasina and Zia from active politics and encourage the emergence of a new political leadership. The proposal was controversial and was criticized by political parties and observers who viewed it as an attempt to reshape Bangladesh's political system without an electoral mandate.

=== Electoral and institutional reforms ===
The caretaker government placed substantial emphasis on electoral reform in preparation for the postponed parliamentary election. The Election Commission announced that additional time would be required to prepare for the election and subsequently developed a roadmap for completing a new voter-registration process.

The voter-registration process included the preparation of a new computerized electoral roll and the introduction of photographs and biometric information on voter identification cards. The reforms were intended to improve the accuracy of the electoral register and reduce irregularities associated with duplicate or fictitious voters.

The government also pursued institutional reforms, including the separation of the judiciary from the executive. On 1 November 2007, the judiciary was formally separated from the executive branch, implementing a constitutional requirement that had not previously been fully implemented.

=== August 2007 student protests ===
In August 2007, an altercation at Dhaka University developed into wider student protests. Demonstrations spread beyond the university and became a broader challenge to the emergency-backed administration and the presence of the military on university campuses.

The government responded by imposing curfews and using security forces to restore order. Human rights organizations criticized the repression of the protests and raised concerns about the treatment of demonstrators.

=== Natural disasters ===
Chief Adviser Fakhruddin Ahmed inspects the Barisal region affected by Cyclone Sidr.

The caretaker government faced major natural disasters during its tenure. On 15 November 2007, Cyclone Sidr struck the southern coast of Bangladesh, causing extensive loss of life and damage to infrastructure.

The government, with substantial assistance from the armed forces, coordinated relief and rehabilitation operations in affected areas.

=== Food-price crisis ===
Bangladesh was also affected by the global food-price crisis of 2007–08. Rising international prices contributed to inflation and placed pressure on household food security.

The government responded with measures including open market sales (OMS) of rice and other staple foods in an effort to make essential commodities available to lower-income households.

=== Political dialogue and election preparation ===
After an initial period of restrictions, the caretaker government gradually permitted greater political activity during 2008. It held discussions with major political parties and worked with the Election Commission to establish conditions for a parliamentary election.

The Election Commission completed the revised voter-registration process and prepared for the parliamentary election, which was eventually scheduled for 29 December 2008.

The election brought an end to the prolonged caretaker administration.

== Economic affairs ==
During the caretaker government's tenure, economic policy focused on maintaining macroeconomic stability amid political uncertainty, inflationary pressures, natural disasters and the emerging global financial crisis.

Inflation was a major concern during 2007 and 2008, partly because of rising international commodity prices and domestic supply constraints. The government used measures including increased imports of essential commodities and expanded open-market sales to address shortages and limit pressure on food prices.

Bangladesh's economy continued to grow during the caretaker period, although growth slowed compared with some preceding years. GDP growth was approximately 5.9% in fiscal year 2008–09. Remittances from overseas workers and continued growth in the ready-made garment industry remained important sources of foreign exchange and economic activity.

The government also continued cooperation with international financial institutions, including the World Bank and International Monetary Fund, and pursued measures aimed at strengthening public financial management and revenue collection.

Agriculture remained an important part of the economy and received policy attention because of food-security concerns. Government measures included fertilizer subsidies, agricultural credit and procurement programs intended to support agricultural production following natural disasters.

The global financial crisis of 2008 created risks for Bangladesh's export and remittance earnings. The country's relatively limited integration with global financial markets helped reduce its exposure to the international financial turmoil, although export growth slowed temporarily.

The government's economic policies also attracted criticism. Political uncertainty and the anti-corruption campaign affected sections of the business community, with some analysts arguing that the government's interventions contributed to weaker private investment and reduced business confidence.

== Foreign affairs ==
The caretaker government sought to maintain Bangladesh's international relationships while explaining its political reforms and plans for elections. The Ministry of Foreign Affairs engaged with foreign governments and international organizations regarding the country's political situation, electoral reforms and governance initiatives.

=== India ===
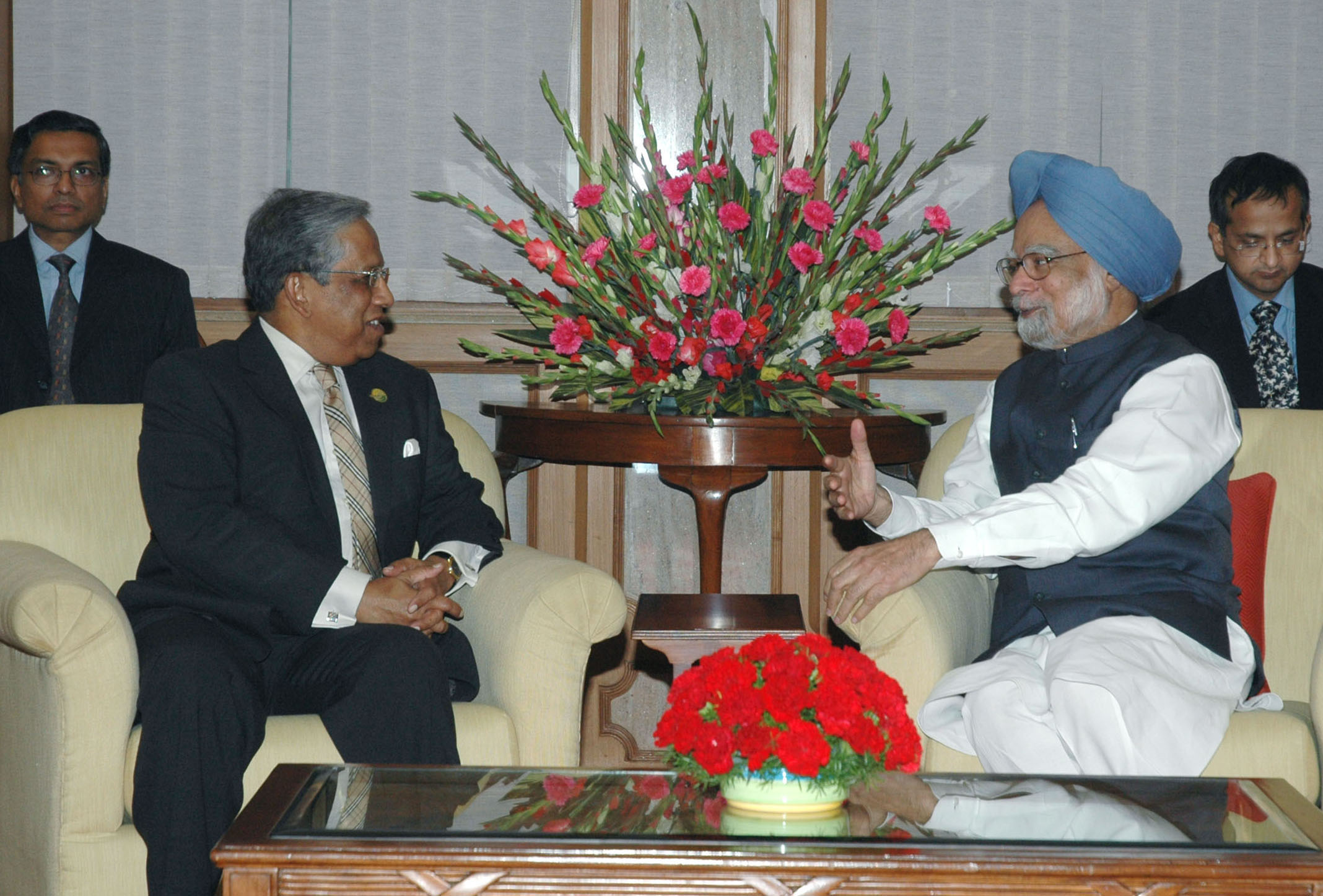
Chief Adviser Fakhruddin Ahmed calling on the Prime Minister Manmohan Singh in New Delhi on November 12, 2008.

Relations with India remained an important element of Bangladesh's foreign policy during the caretaker period. Bilateral cooperation included trade, disaster relief and regional diplomacy.

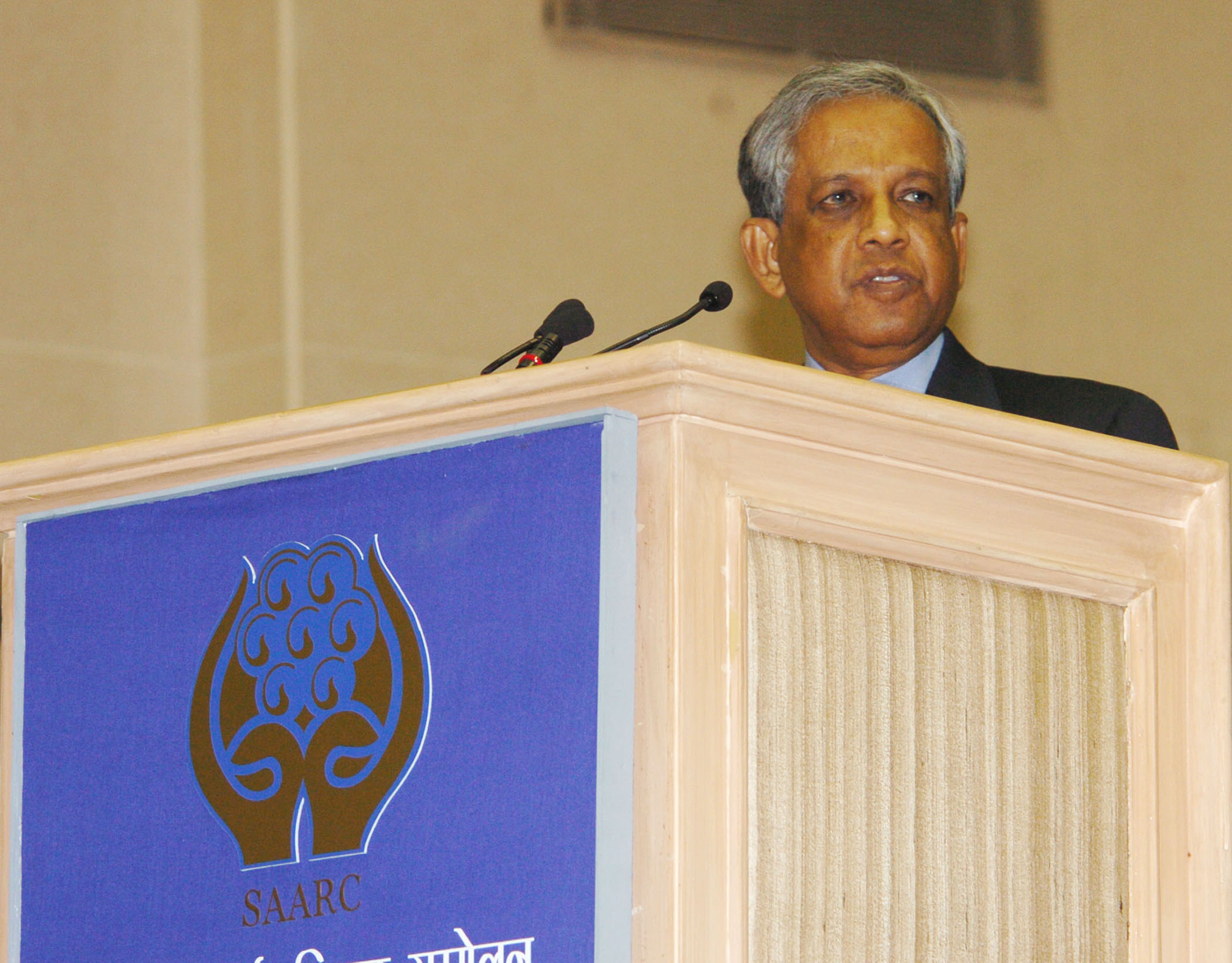
Chief Adviser Fakhruddin Ahmed addressing the 14th SAARC Summit in 2007.

Following Cyclone Sidr, India provided humanitarian assistance and offered food and reconstruction support. Bangladesh and India also continued cooperation through regional organizations including the SAARC.

=== China ===
Relations with China remained close during the caretaker government's tenure. In April 2008, Chief Adviser Fakhruddin Ahmed met Chinese Foreign Minister Yang Jiechi in Dhaka. Discussions included trade, agriculture, transportation and investment.

Bangladesh reaffirmed its support for the One-China policy and expressed interest in expanding economic cooperation with China.

=== Pakistan ===
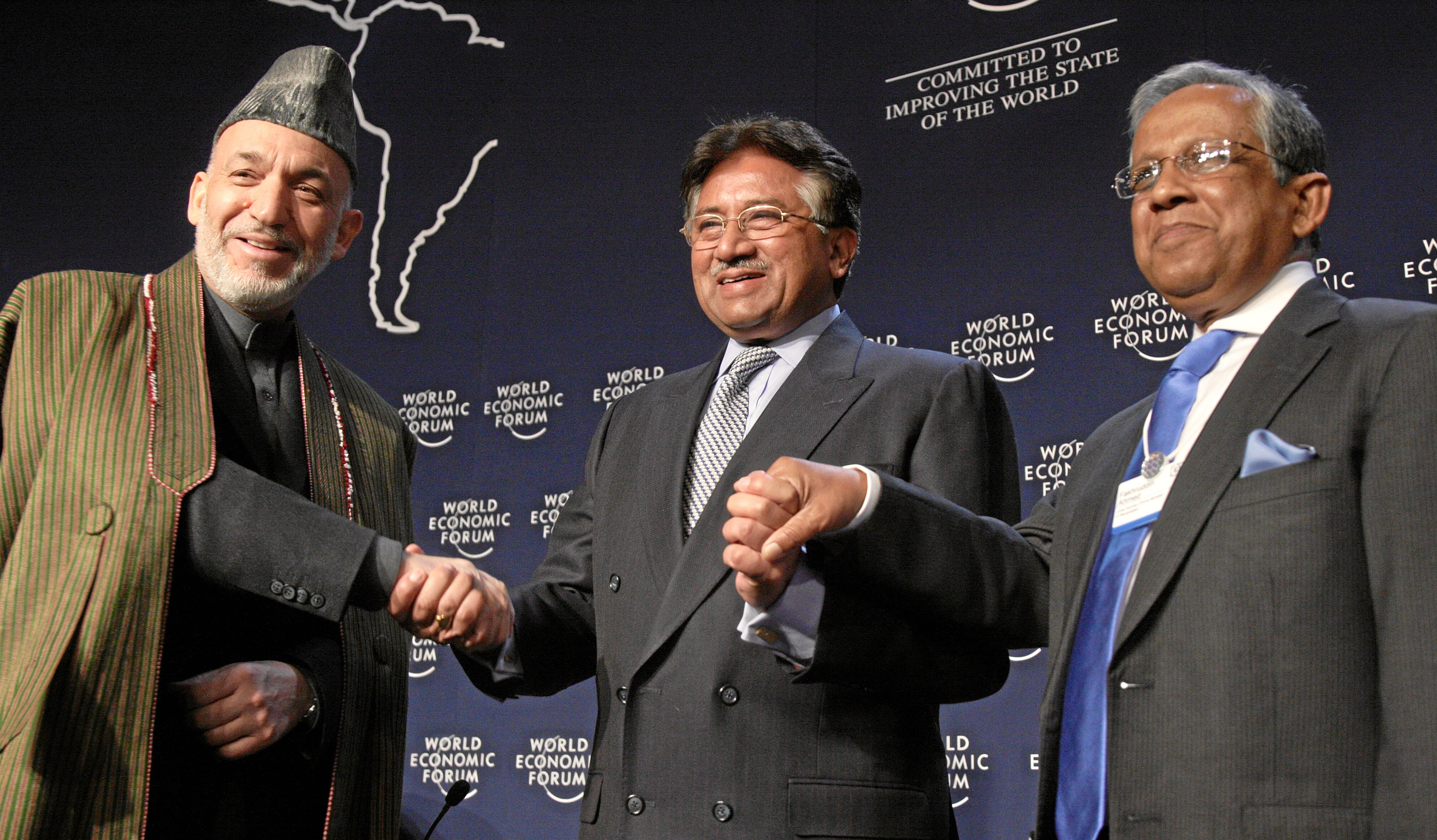
President Hamid Karzai, President Pervez Musharraf and Chief Adviser Fakhruddin Ahmed at the Annual Meeting 2008 of the World Economic Forum in Davos, Switzerland, January 24, 2008.

Relations with Pakistan remained formally cordial. Fakhruddin Ahmed congratulated Muhammad Mian Soomro on his appointment as Pakistan's caretaker prime minister in 2007 and expressed Bangladesh's interest in maintaining bilateral and regional cooperation.

The two countries also continued diplomatic engagement through SAARC and other regional forums.

=== Myanmar ===
Relations with Myanmar during the caretaker government's tenure included issues concerning border stability and maritime disputes.

In November 2008, Bangladesh and Myanmar became involved in a naval standoff over disputed maritime territory in the Bay of Bengal. The dispute was subsequently addressed through diplomatic negotiations.

=== United States ===
The United States remained an important diplomatic and development partner of Bangladesh during the caretaker period. Fakhruddin Ahmed met foreign leaders during international visits and discussed the caretaker government's reform program and plans for elections.

The government also emphasized cooperation with the international community on counterterrorism and democratic institutions.

=== European Union ===
Relations with the European Union focused on development cooperation, governance and electoral reform. European governments and institutions expressed interest in issues including the strengthening of the Election Commission, judicial independence and anti-corruption measures.

== 2008 general election ==
The caretaker government's central political objective was to organize a parliamentary election after the election originally scheduled for January 2007 had been postponed.

On 5 April 2007, Chief Election Commissioner ATM Shamsul Huda stated that the election would need to be delayed substantially. On 12 April, Fakhruddin Ahmed announced that the parliamentary election would be held before the end of 2008.

The Election Commission subsequently published an electoral roadmap in July 2007, setting out plans for voter registration and the election timetable.

The general election was held on 29 December 2008 to elect the members of the ninth Jatiya Sangsad. The election followed nearly two years of emergency-backed caretaker rule.

The principal contest was between the Awami League-led Grand Alliance, headed by Sheikh Hasina, and the BNP-led Four-Party Alliance, headed by Khaleda Zia. The Grand Alliance won 263 of the 300 directly elected parliamentary seats, while the BNP-led alliance won 32 seats. Other parties and independent candidates won the remaining seats.

Voter turnout was approximately 87%, among the highest recorded levels in Bangladesh's parliamentary elections.

Polling in the Noakhali-1 constituency was postponed following the death of an Awami League candidate and was subsequently held on 12 January 2009.

About 50,000 soldiers of Bangladesh Army and 600,000 Bangladesh Police, Bangladesh Rifles and other para-military officers were deployed to guard against election fraud and violence. However, two people were killed in post election violence.

International observers, including delegations from the European Union and the Commonwealth, generally described the election as peaceful and credible.

The successful completion of the election marked the conclusion of the caretaker government's principal electoral mandate. Sheikh Hasina was sworn in as Prime Minister on 6 January 2009, formally ending Fakhruddin Ahmed's administration.

=== End of Tenure ===
The caretaker government's tenure ended following the December 2008 parliamentary election and the formation of the new elected government. Sheikh Hasina was sworn in as Prime Minister on 6 January 2009. Fakhruddin Ahmed subsequently left public office and later lived in the United States. The transfer of power marked the return of Bangladesh to an elected parliamentary government following the extended caretaker administration.

== Cabinet ==
The caretaker administration consisted of the Chief Adviser and a council of advisers responsible for portfolios such as finance, home affairs, foreign affairs, law, education, health, and communications. Members were primarily technocrats, civil servants, academics, and retired officials.

== Controversies and Criticism ==
=== Emergency powers and civil liberties ===
The government's reliance on emergency powers was one of the principal sources of controversy. Restrictions on political activity, public gatherings and freedom of expression remained in effect for much of its tenure.

Human rights organizations criticized the restrictions and argued that the emergency environment weakened political participation and civil liberties. The government maintained that emergency measures were necessary to restore political stability and prepare the country for a credible election.

=== Detention of political leaders ===
The detention and prosecution of leading politicians became another major controversy. Sheikh Hasina and Khaleda Zia were both detained on corruption-related charges during the caretaker period.

Supporters of the two leaders and some political observers questioned the political motivations of the prosecutions, while government officials maintained that the cases formed part of a broader anti-corruption campaign.

=== Military influence ===
The caretaker government came to office amid substantial military involvement in the political crisis. Analysts and observers consequently regarded the administration as having significant military backing.

The extent of military influence over political decision-making remained controversial. Critics argued that military support gave the unelected caretaker government unusual political authority, while the government maintained that it operated within the constitutional framework.

=== Political reform proposals ===
The caretaker government considered a number of political reforms, including changes relating to political parties and candidate selection. The most controversial of these proposals became associated with the "Minus Two" formula, which was interpreted by critics as an attempt to remove Sheikh Hasina and Khaleda Zia from active politics.

Critics argued that major changes to the political system should be made by an elected government rather than an interim administration. The controversy contributed to concerns about the scope of the caretaker government's political role.

=== Human Rights Concerns ===
Human rights organizations reported allegations of arbitrary arrests, torture in custody and restrictions on due process during the emergency period.

The use of emergency powers and special judicial mechanisms drew criticism from international human rights organizations and political observers. These criticisms became an important part of assessments of the caretaker government's record.

=== Economic criticism ===
Although Bangladesh's economy continued to grow during the caretaker period, the government's anti-corruption campaign and political uncertainty created concerns among parts of the business community. Some analysts argued that administrative interventions and uncertainty over the government's economic policies contributed to weaker private investment and business confidence.

== See also ==
- Premiership of Sheikh Mujibur Rahman
- Presidency of Ziaur Rahman
- Premiership of Khaleda Zia
- Premiership of Sheikh Hasina
- Interim government of Muhammad Yunus
- Premiership of Tarique Rahman
