= Premiership of Khaleda Zia =

Period of the Government of Bangladesh from 1991 to 1996 and 2001 to 2006

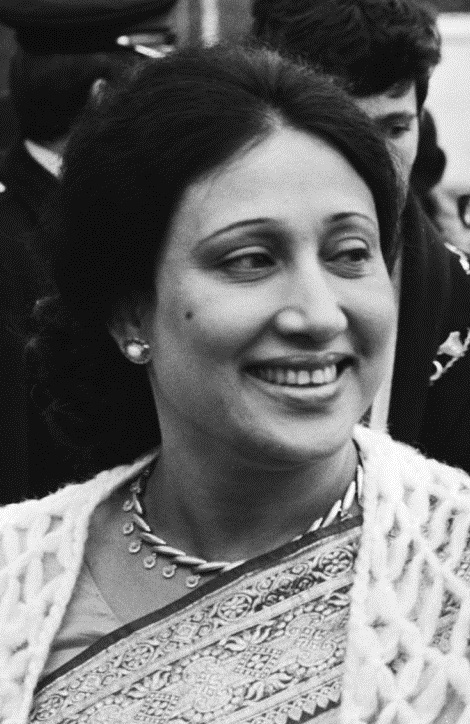
- Zia in 1979
- Premiership of Khaleda Zia
- Prime Minister: Khaleda Zia
- Party: Bangladesh Nationalist Party
- Seat: Ganabhaban
- First term 20 March 1991 – 19 March 1996
- Cabinet: First
- Election: 1991
- Appointed by: President Shahabuddin Ahmed
- Seat: Feni-1
- Second term 19 March 1996 – 30 March 1996
- Cabinet: Second
- Election: 1996 (Feb)
- Appointed by: President Abdur Rahman Biswas
- Seat: Feni-1
- Third term 10 October 2001 – 29 October 2006
- Cabinet: Third
- Election: 2001
- Appointed by: President Shahabuddin Ahmed
- Seat: Bogra-6

Khaleda Zia's tenure as Prime Minister of Bangladesh began on 20 March 1991, when she assumed office after her party, the Bangladesh Nationalist Party (BNP), won the 1991 general election, succeeding Shahabuddin Ahmed's interim government. Her first term lasted until 30 March 1996. She returned to office on 10 October 2001 following her party's victory in the 2001 general election.

Begum Khaleda Zia served as the prime minister of Bangladesh for three times. Her first term was from March 1991 to February 1996, second term lasted for a few days after February 1996 and third term was from October 2001 to October 2006. She is particularly remembered for her role in making education accessible and introducing some key economic reforms.

== First premiership (1991–1996) ==
=== First term ===
A neutral caretaker government in Bangladesh oversaw elections on 27 February 1991 following eight years of Ershad presidency. BNP won 140 seats – 11 short of simple majority. Zia was sworn in as the country's first female prime minister on 20 March 1991 with the support of a majority of the deputies in parliament. The acting president Shahabuddin Ahmed granted Zia nearly all of the powers that were vested in the president at the time, effectively returning Bangladesh to a parliamentary system. With a unanimous vote, the parliament passed the 12th amendment to the constitution in August 1991, formally ending 16 years of presidential rule.

==== Educational reforms ====
When Begum Khaleda Zia took charge in 1991, Bangladeshi children received about two years of education on average, and for every three boys, there was one girl studying in the same classroom. Begum Khaleda Zia promoted education and vocational training very aggressively. Her government made primary education free and mandatory for all. Education was made free for girls until the 10th grade.

To fund the implementation of new reforms and policies, in 1994, the education budget was increased by 60%, the highest allocation amongst the formal budget sectors.

In 1990, only 31.73% students passed in the SSC examination and the rate was 30.11% for female. In 1995, thanks to her policies, 73.2% students passed the SSC examination and among the female students, 71.58% passed.

==== Economic reforms ====
Some of the major economic reforms marked the First Khaleda Zia government, that included the introduction of Value Added Tax (VAT), formulation of Bank Company Act in 1991 and Financial Institutions Act in 1993, and the establishment of privatization board in 1993. Besides, Bangladesh signed the General Agreement on Tariffs and Trade in 1993.

A new export processing zone was established near Dhaka in 1993 to attract foreign investors.

==== Administrative reforms ====
The First Khaleda Zia government, to address popular demand, passed a law to allow the mayors of city corporations to be elected directly by the voters. Before that, the elected ward councilors of each ward of the city corporation used to elect the mayor of the city.

Zia's administration abolished the Upazila system in November 1991. It formed the Local Government Structure Review Commission, which recommended a two-tier system of local government, district and union councils. Also the Thana Development and Coordination Committee was formed to coordinate development activities at the thana level.

=== Second term ===
When the opposition boycotted the 15 February 1996 election, Zia's party BNP had a landslide victory in the 6th Jatiya Sangshad. Other major parties demanded a neutral caretaker government to be appointed to oversee the elections. The short-lived parliament hastily introduced the caretaker government by passing the 13th amendment to the constitution. The parliament was dissolved to pave the way for parliamentary elections within 90 days.

In the 12 June 1996 elections, BNP lost to Sheikh Hasina's Awami League. Winning 116 seats, BNP emerged as the largest opposition party in the country's parliamentary history.

== Second premiership (2001–2006) ==
=== Third term ===
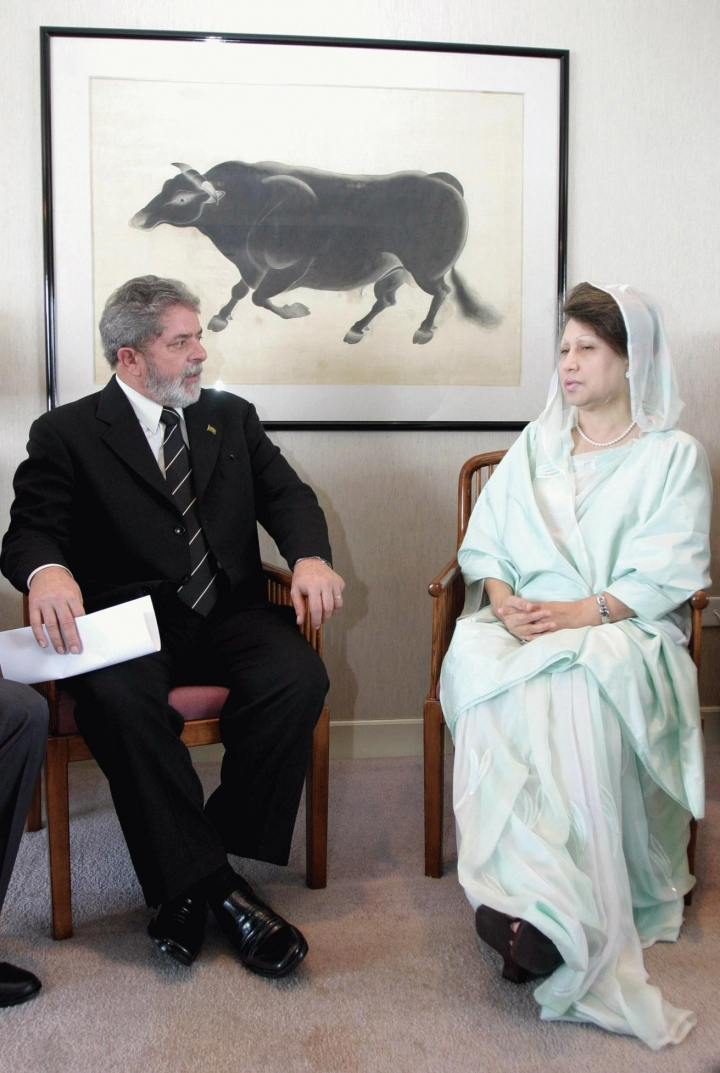
Zia with the President of Brazil Lula da Silva (2004)

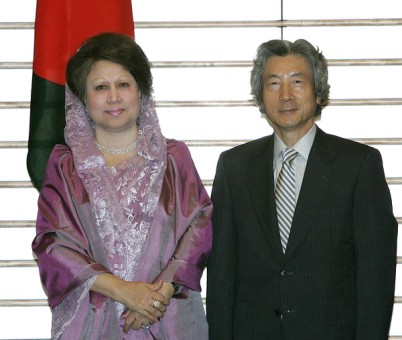
Zia with the Prime Minister of Japan Jun'ichirō Koizumi in Tokyo (2005)

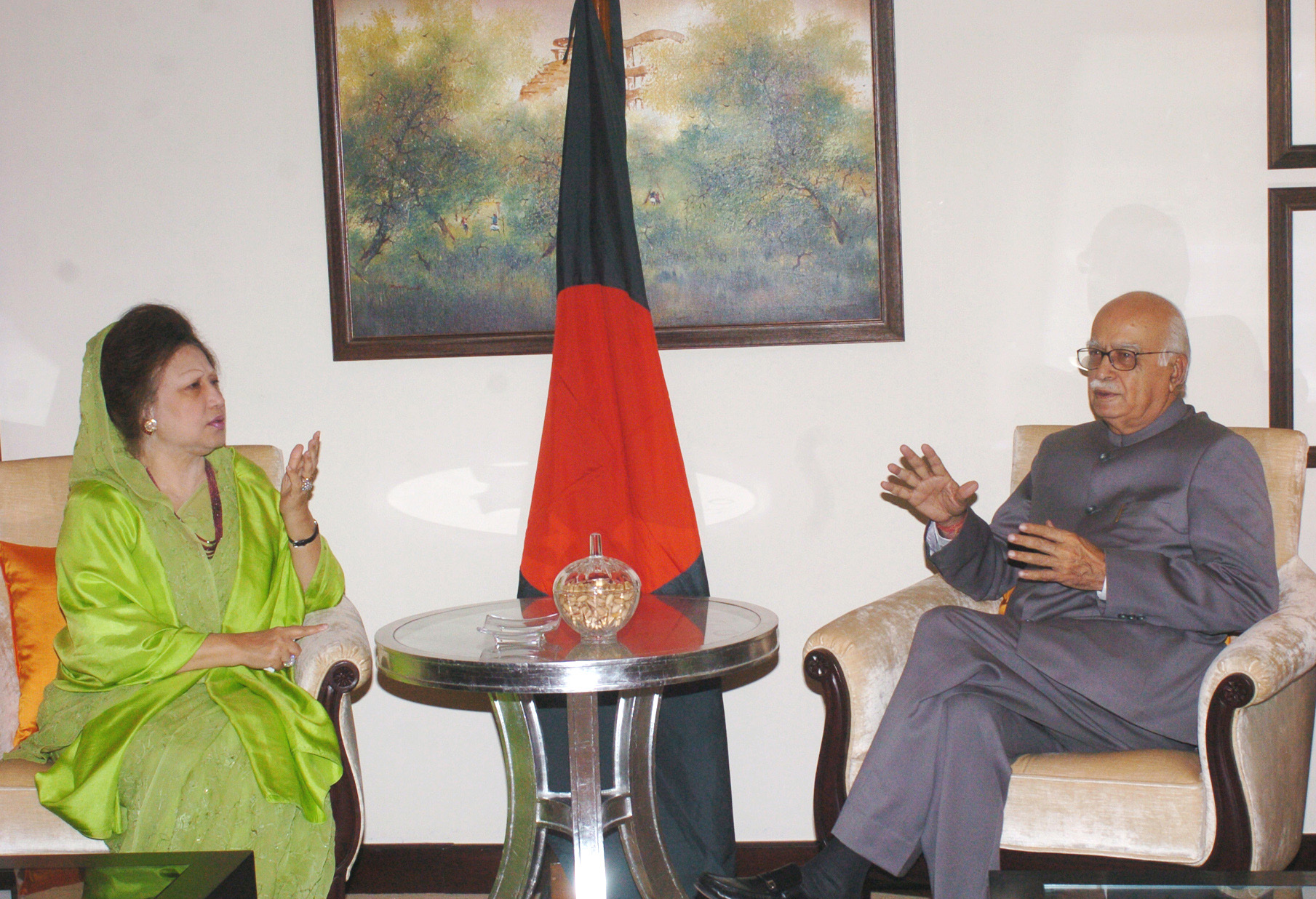
Zia with the Indian Leader of Opposition L. K. Advani in New Delhi (2006)

The BNP formed a four-party alliance on 6 January 1999 to increase its chances to return to power in the next general elections. These included its former political foe the Jatiya Party, the Islamic parties such as Jamaat-e-Islami Bangladesh and the Islami Oikya Jote. It encouraged protests against the ruling Awami League.

Many residents strongly criticized Zia and BNP for allying with Jamaat-e-Islami, which had opposed the independence of Bangladesh in 1971. The four-party alliance participated in the 1 October 2001 general elections, winning two-thirds of the seats in parliament and 46% of the vote (compared to the principal opposition party's 40%). Zia was sworn in as the prime minister of Bangladesh.

She worked on a 100-day programme to fulfill most of her election pledges to the nation. During this term, the share of domestic resources in economic development efforts grew. Bangladesh began to attract a higher level of international investment for development of the country's infrastructure, energy resources and businesses, including from the United States, Great Britain, and Japan. Restoration of law and order was an achievement during the period.

Zia promoted neighbourly relations in her foreign policy. In her "look-east policy", she worked to bolster regional cooperation in South Asia and adherence to the UN Charter of Human Rights. She negotiated settlement of international disputes, and renounced the use of force in international relations. Bangladesh began to participate in United Nations international peacekeeping efforts. In 2006, Forbes magazine featured her administration in a major story praising her achievements. Her government worked to educate young girls (nearly 70% of Bangladeshi women were illiterate) and distribute food to the poor (half of Bangladesh's 135 million people lived below the poverty line). Her government promoted strong GDP growth (5%) based on economic reforms and support of an entrepreneurial culture.

When Zia became prime minister for the third time, the GDP growth rate of Bangladesh remained above 6 percent. The Bangladesh per capita national income rose to 482 dollars. Foreign exchange reserve of Bangladesh had crossed 3 billion dollars from the previous 1 billion dollars. The foreign direct investments of Bangladesh had risen to 2.5 billion dollars. The industrial sector of the GDP had exceeded 17 percent at the end of Zia's office.

On 29 October 2006, Zia's term in office ended. In accordance with the constitution, a caretaker government would manage in the 90-day interim before general elections. On the eve of the last day, rioting broke out on the streets of central Dhaka due to uncertainty over, who would become Chief Advisor (head of the Caretaker Government of Bangladesh). Under the constitution, the immediate past Chief Justice was to be appointed. But, Chief Justice Khondokar Mahmud Hasan (K M Hasan) declined the position. President Iajuddin Ahmed, as provided for in the constitution, assumed power as Chief Advisor on 29 October 2006. He tried to arrange elections and bring all political parties to the table during months of violence; 40 people were killed and hundreds injured in the first month after the government's resignation in November 2006.

Mukhlesur Rahman Chowdhury, the presidential advisor, met with Zia and Sheikh Hasina, and other political parties to try to resolve issues and schedule elections. Negotiations continued against a backdrop of political bickering, protests and polarisation that threatened the economy. Officially on 26 December 2006, all political parties joined the planned 22 January 2007 elections. The Awami League pulled out at the last minute, and in January, the military intervened to back the caretaker government for a longer interim period. It held power until holding general elections in December 2008.

== Domestic affairs ==
During the premierships of Khaleda Zia, domestic policy was shaped by efforts to consolidate parliamentary democracy, pursue administrative reforms and address socio-economic development challenges amid intense political competition. Her first administration (1991–1996) oversaw the restoration of the parliamentary system through the Twelfth Amendment to the Constitution, reversing the presidential system introduced during military rule and initiated programs aimed at expanding primary education, rural development and women's participation in the workforce. Her governments also emphasized infrastructure development, including road construction and energy sector initiatives, alongside policies intended to encourage private sector growth.

During her second term (2001–2006), the administration focused on law and order measures, decentralization initiatives and poverty reduction programs, while also introducing social safety-net schemes and educational stipends, particularly for female students. However, domestic governance during both terms was frequently affected by political confrontation between the ruling party and opposition groups, leading to parliamentary boycotts, street protests and periods of instability that influenced policy implementation and administrative continuity.

== Foreign affairs ==
=== Saudi Arabia ===
Zia made some high-profile foreign visits in the later part of 2012. Invited to Saudi Arabia in August by the royal family, she met with the Saudi crown prince and defence minister Salman bin Abdulaziz Al Saud to talk about bilateral ties. She tried to promote better access for Bangladeshi migrant workers to the Saudi labour market, which was in decline at the time.

=== China ===
She went to People's Republic of China in October, at the invitation of the government. She met with Chinese leaders including then Vice President Xi Jinping and the head of the International Department of the Chinese Communist Party Wang Jiarui. Xi became General Secretary of the Chinese Communist Party in 2012.

Talks in China related to trade and prospective Chinese investment in Bangladesh, particularly the issue of financing Padma Bridge. At the beginning of 2012, the World Bank, a major prospective financier, had withdrawn, accusing government ministers of graft. The BNP announced that Chinese funding for a second Padma Bridge was confirmed during her visit.

=== India ===
On 28 October 2012, Zia visited India to meet with President Pranab Mukherjee, Prime Minister Manmohan Singh and a number of officials including foreign minister Salman Khurshid, national security adviser Shivshankar Menon, foreign secretary Ranjan Mathai and BJP leader and leader of opposition Sushma Swaraj. Talks were scheduled to cover bilateral trade and regional security.

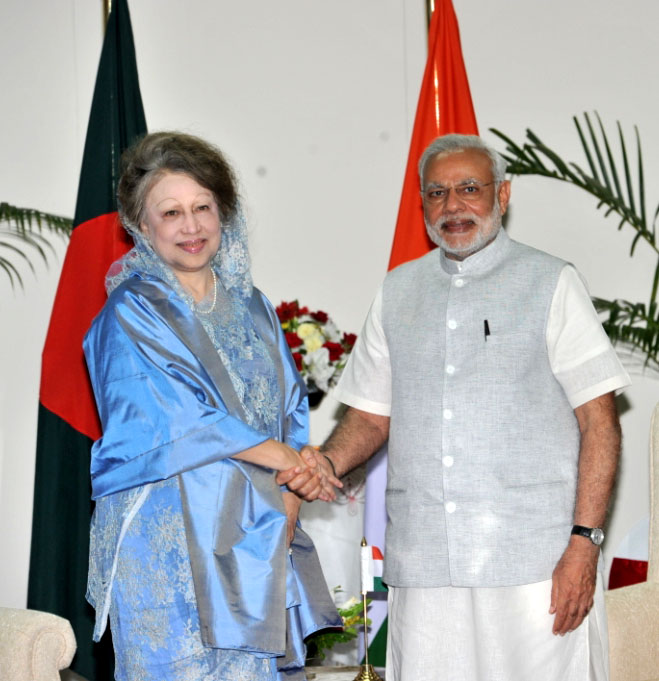
Zia with Prime Minister of India, Narendra Modi, in 2015

Zia's India visit was considered notable as BNP had been considered to have been anti-India compared to its rival Awami League. At her meeting with Prime Minister Singh, Zia said her party wanted to work with India for mutual benefit, including the fight against extremism. Indian officials announced they had come to agreement with her to pursue a common geopolitical doctrine in the greater region to discourage terrorists.

== Economic affairs ==
The economic policies pursued during the premierships of Khaleda Zia focused on market-oriented reforms, private sector development and macroeconomic stabilization within the broader framework of structural adjustment programs supported by international financial institutions. During her first term (1991–1996), the government promoted trade liberalization, encouraged foreign investment and advanced privatization of state-owned enterprises, while maintaining steady economic growth and expanding the export-oriented ready-made garments sector, which became a major contributor to national income and employment. The administration also worked with international donors such as the World Bank and the International Monetary Fund to implement fiscal reforms and poverty reduction initiatives.

During her second term (2001–2006), the government continued policies aimed at economic growth, infrastructure expansion and energy sector development, alongside efforts to improve telecommunications and promote export diversification. Bangladesh experienced moderate GDP growth during this period, supported by remittance inflows from overseas workers and continued expansion of the garments industry, although the economy faced challenges including governance concerns, power shortages and political instability. Critics argued that corruption and administrative inefficiencies constrained the full potential of economic reforms, while supporters maintained that the policies contributed to sustained growth and poverty reduction over the long term.

== Controversies and criticism ==
The premierships of Khaleda Zia were marked by political controversy and criticism from opposition parties, civil society organizations and international observers. Her administrations faced allegations of corruption involving senior government officials and individuals close to her, several of which became subjects of legal proceedings after her tenure. Critics also expressed concern regarding governance practices, including the politicization of state institutions and the frequent use of nationwide strikes (hartals), which contributed to political instability and economic disruption.

During her second term (2001–2006), the government faced increased scrutiny over the rise of Islamist militancy, particularly following the coordinated nationwide bombings in 17 August 2005 carried out by militant groups, although authorities subsequently undertook counterterrorism operations and arrested several leaders of extremist organizations. Human rights organizations raised concerns about extrajudicial killings by security forces, especially the Rapid Action Battalion, as well as issues relating to press freedom and political violence. Supporters of Zia, however, argued that her governments achieved economic growth and maintained national sovereignty despite challenging political conditions and intense partisan rivalry.

== See also ==
- Premiership of Sheikh Mujibur Rahman – Period of the Government of Bangladesh from 1972 to 1975
- Presidency of Ziaur Rahman – Period of Government of Bangladesh from 1977 to 1981
- Premiership of Sheikh Hasina – Period of the Government of Bangladesh from 1996 to 2001 and 2009 to 2024
- Interim government of Muhammad Yunus – Period of the Government of Bangladesh from 2024 to 2026
- Premiership of Tarique Rahman – Government of Bangladesh (2026–present)
