= Premiership of Tarique Rahman =

Government of Bangladesh (2026–present)

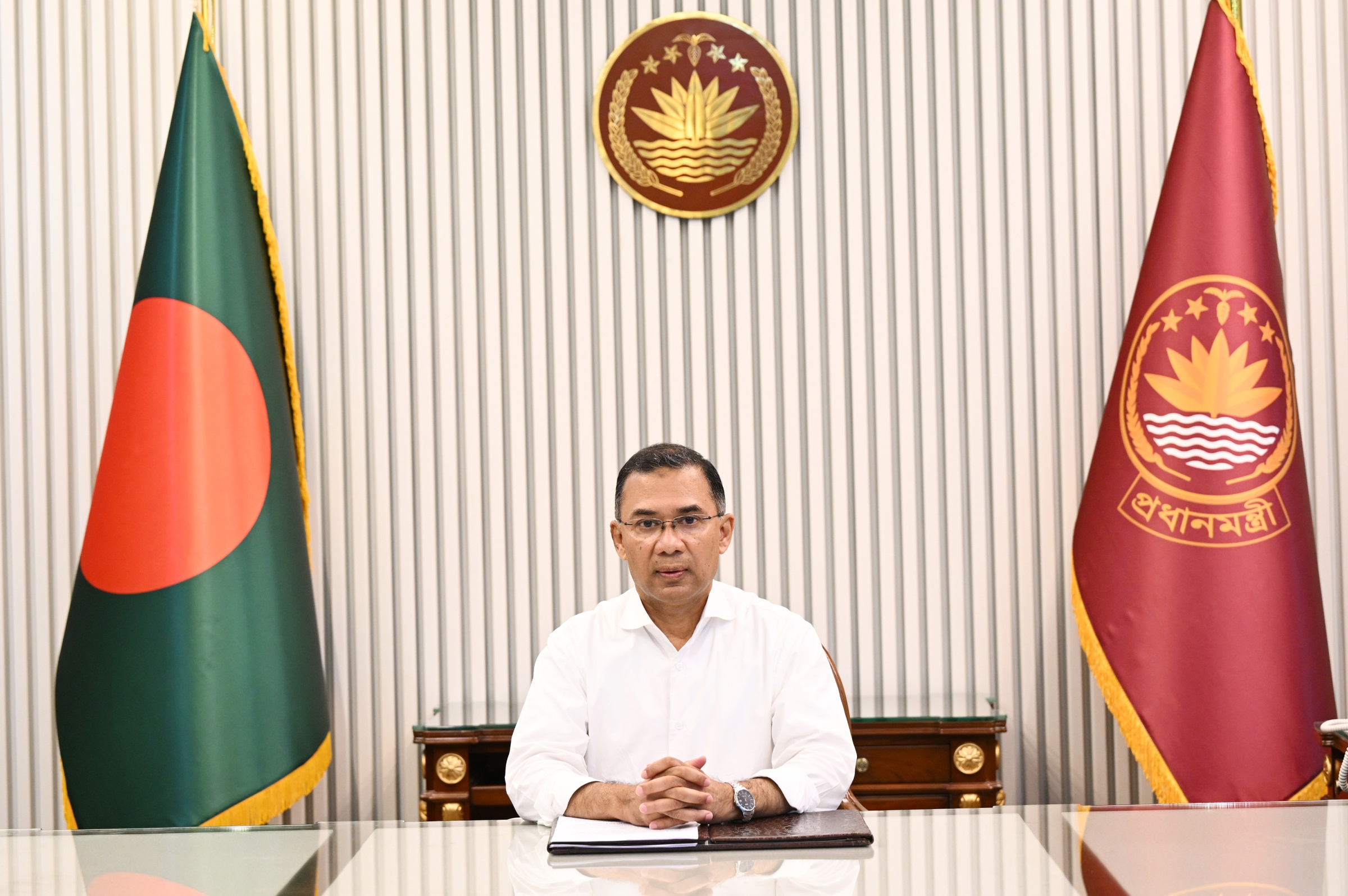
- Rahman delivering his first speech as prime minister on 17 February 2026
- Premiership of Tarique Rahman; 17 February 2026 – present
- Prime Minister: Tarique Rahman
- Party: Bangladesh Nationalist Party
- First term 17 February 2026 – present
- Cabinet: Tarique
- Election: 2026
- Appointed by: President Mohammed Shahabuddin
- Seat: Dhaka-17

Tarique Rahman became the 11th prime minister of Bangladesh after his party, the Bangladesh Nationalist Party (BNP), won the 2026 election and replaced the interim government led by Muhammad Yunus.

== Background ==
After nearly two decades in exile, Tarique Rahman returned to Bangladesh in 2025 following the dismissal of legal charges by the judiciary under the interim government. The BNP won a landslide victory in the 2026 general election, securing 209 seats. It was the first election since the July Uprising of 2024, that ended Sheikh Hasina's 15-year-old regime. Rahman also personally won election to the Jatiya Sangsad from constituencies including Dhaka-17 and Bogra-6. As the Chairman of the Bangladesh Nationalist Party, he took over the positions of prime minister and the leader of the house.

== Inauguration ==
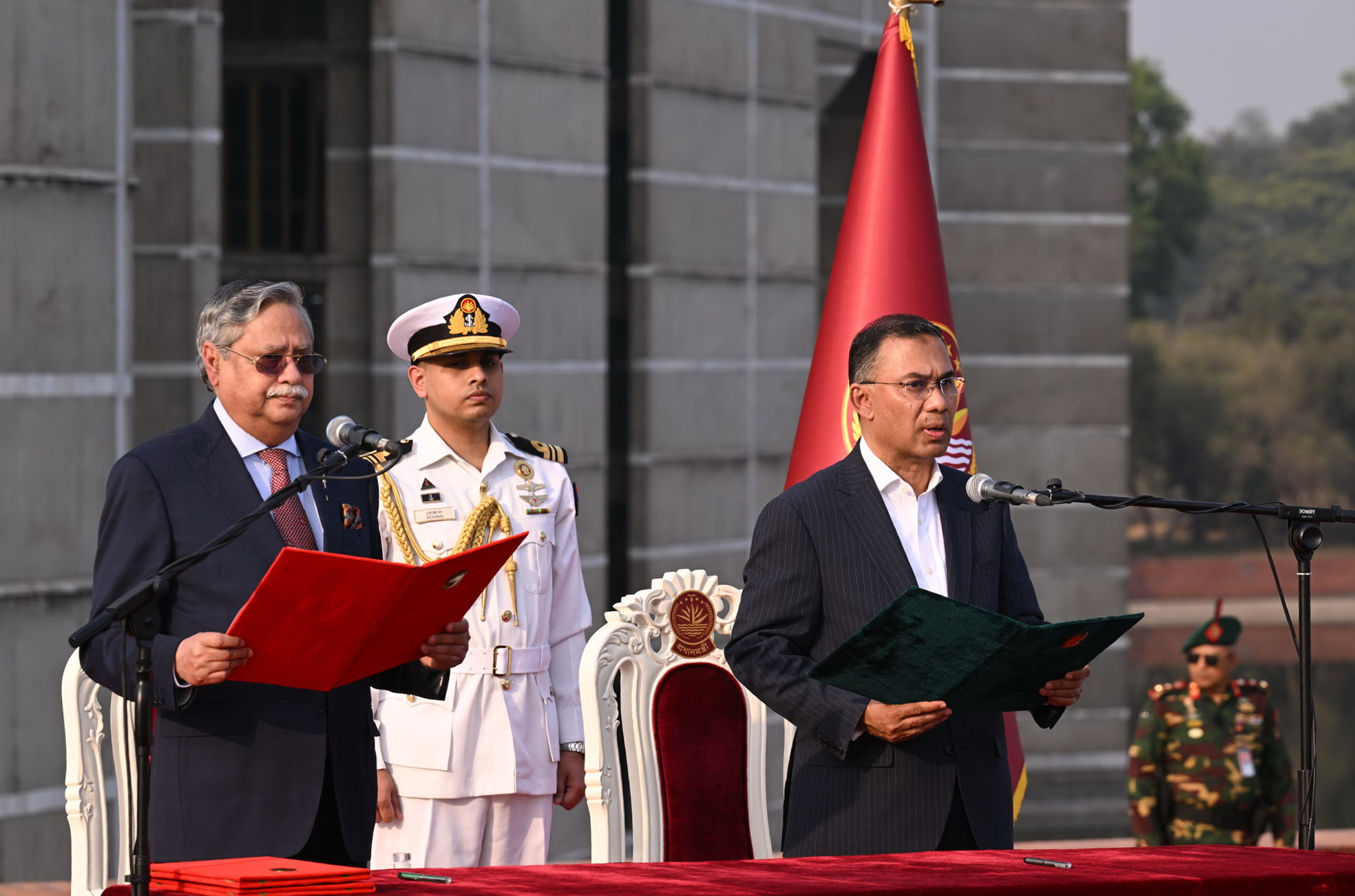
Tarique Rahman taking oath as the Prime Minister of Bangladesh on 17 February 2026

Tarique Rahman was inaugurated for the first term as prime minister on 17 February 2026 at 16:00 BST. The ceremony was held in Jatiya Sangsad Bhaban South Plaza. Rahman along with 30 other members of the cabinet took oath. President Mohammed Shahabuddin administered the oath.

== Domestic affairs ==
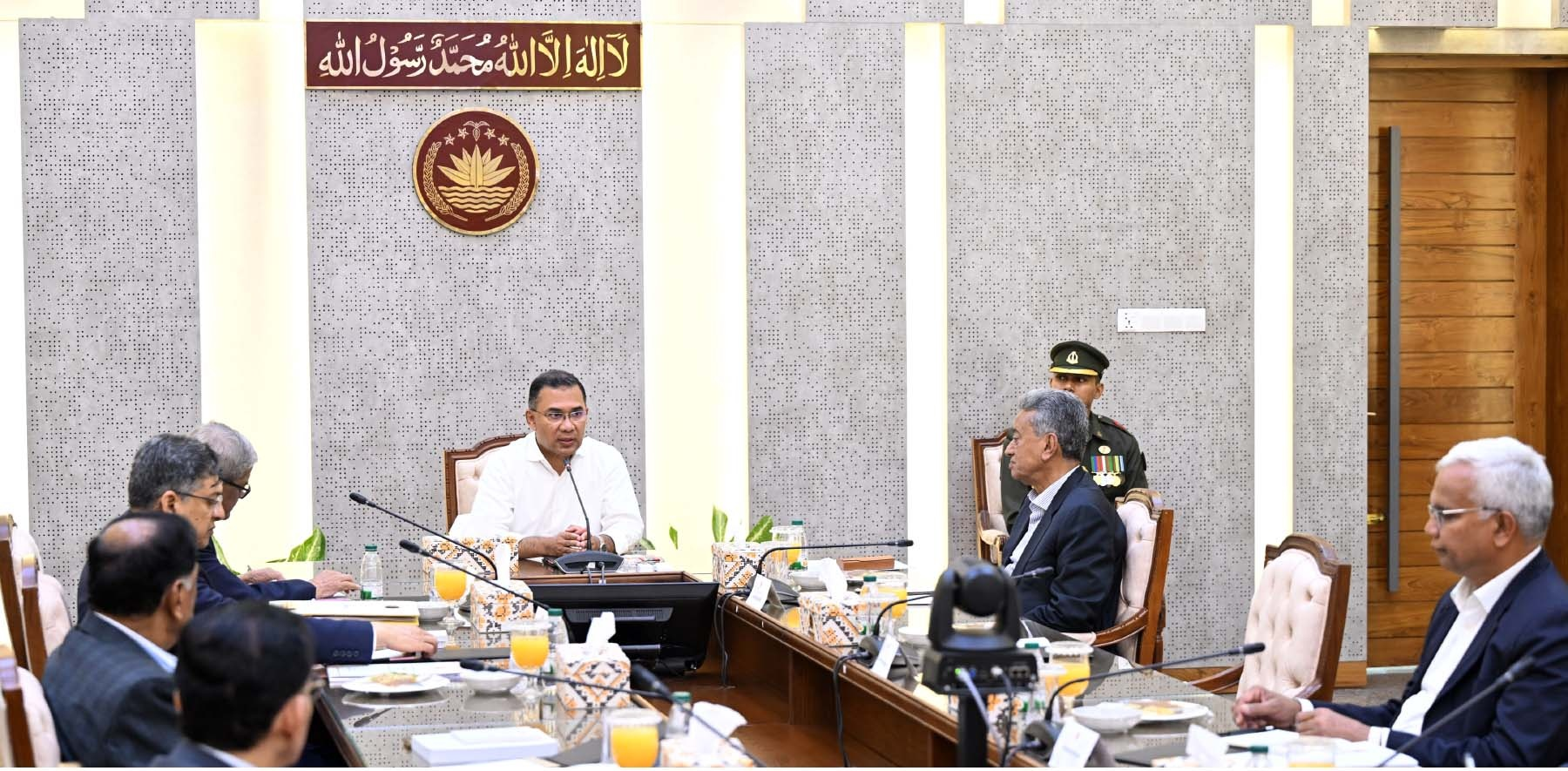
Prime Minister Rahman presided over the first cabinet meeting in the Cabinet Division at the Secretariat.

Rahman started his premiership by paying homage to the martyrs of the Liberation War at National Martyrs' Memorial and visiting the tombs of Ziaur Rahman and Khaleda Zia, who are incidentally his father and mother. He held the first meeting of his cabinet on 18 February 2026 at the Secretariat. Three priorities primarily were set by the government – price control of necessary commodities, improvement of law and order situation, and maintenance of normal supply of electricity and energy.

He delivered his first speech on 17 February 2026 after swearing as the prime minister, where he placed the law and order, as well as the anti-corruption measures as top priority for the government, stating:

As head of government, I want to draw the attention of the people to one issue — those who voted for BNP and gave it the opportunity to form the new government, those who did not vote for it, or those who did not vote for anyone at all, all have equal rights to this government.

Government took initiative to reopen eight previously closed-airports in the country and turn Bogra Airport into an international airport, in order to improve regional communications, investment and tourism. The government also launched start-up grants up to ৳5 million for entrepreneurs in the technology sector.

=== Security policy ===
Following Bharatiya Janata Party's victory in the West Bengal Legislative Assembly election in 2026, Rahman's government tightened security along the Indian border in order to resist any push-ins of alleged illegal Bangladeshis by the Indian forces. The Border Guard Bangladesh (BGB) successfully resisted many push-in attempts by increasing intelligence surveillance and patrolling.

=== Environment policy ===
Before the election campaign, the BNP promised to plant 30 million trees in 5 years tenure.

The government adopted policy aimed to generate 20% of Bangladesh's electricity demands from renewable sources by 2030.

== Economic affairs ==
The government initiated various social security schemes like the Family Card and the Farmers Card, a part of its campaign promises. Family Card aimed to elevate the women's economic conditions and the low-income, marginalized families' economic sufficiency.

For the fiscal year of 2026–27, the government specially focused on revenue collection in the national budget. The government planned to increase value added tax (VAT) on nearly every products, services, businesses and production, although small businesses and environment-friendly products are intended to given some tax cuts and exemptions. The government agency of National Board of Revenue (NBR) also planned to strictly implement the tax policies to expand the revenue system and to prevent tax fraud.

The government also took initiatives to attract investment for the non-profitable enterprises and to reopen the factories closed due to the ongoing economic depression, including a pre-financing scheme providing liquidity support from the surplus funds of banks. In order to integrate and attract domestic and foreign investment, Bangladesh Investment Development Authority (BIDA), Bangladesh Economic Zones Authority (BEZA) and Public-Private Partnership Authority (PPPA) are to be brought under a single agency named Invest Bangladesh Authority. The government also facilitated investment and trade opportunities for "non-resident Bangladeshis".

== Foreign affairs ==
The foreign policy of Tarique Rahman government has been termed as "Bangladesh First" (Bengali: সবার আগে বাংলাদেশ, lit. 'Bangladesh before all'). Foreign minister Khalilur Rahman described it as "a strong commitment to the independence, sovereignty, national interests and welfare" of the people of Bangladesh.

After Rahman took over the government, Bangladesh looked to normalize its strained relations with India during the interim government.

According to the BBC Bangla, the 2026 Iran war was the first major test for the Rahman government's foreign policy. After the US strikes on Iran, Bangladesh condemned Iranian retaliations on Gulf neighbours instead of the initial US strikes. The move was criticized as biased internally. Bangladesh would later express condolence for Khamenei's killing without mentioning the perpetrators.

During Rahman's tenure, Foreign Minister Khalilur Rahman was elected as the President of the United Nations General Assembly for the 81st session in 2026–2027, making him the second Bangladeshi to hold the position after Humayun Rashid Choudhury during the 41st session in 1986−1987.

Rahman made his first prime ministerial visit to Malaysia and China between 21 and 26 June 2026. During the visit to China, he held meetings with President Xi Jinping, Premier Li Qiang, and Chairman Zhao Leji. Discussions focused on reducing the trade deficit, diversifying Bangladeshi exports to China, infrastructure development under the Belt and Road Initiative, and establishing new foreign and defence dialogue mechanisms. The two sides agreed to build a "China-Bangladesh community with a shared future in the new era" and signed 17 memorandums of understanding (MoUs). Also, both sides issued a joint declaration on Comprehensive Strategic Cooperative Partnership, deepening both countries' ties. Rahman also attended the 17th Annual Meeting of the New Champions 2026 (Summer Davos) in Dalian. Political analysts see it as a continuation of BNP's close ties with China since the presidency of Ziaur Rahman.

== Controversies ==
On 25 February 2026, the government replaced Ahsan H. Mansur with Md Mostaqur Rahman as the governor of Bangladesh Bank after protests from a faction of bank officials. The move was criticized for downplaying the freedom of Bangladesh Bank. Samakal compared this with US president Donald Trump's repeated threats to remove the chairman of the United States Federal Reserve Jerome Powell.

According to Manoj Dey of Prothom Alo, the government focused on economy as their main agenda, while ignoring reform and democratization proposals of the interim government. He also pointed out that the government, in line with the previous administrations, become too much dependent on the oligarchy.

In mid-2026, Bangladesh faced growing fuel and energy-related difficulties. In June 2026, the government increased fuel prices amid rising global oil prices and import costs, which led to public concern. From July–August 2026, the situation worsened involving gas shortages, electricity disruptions and fuel supply problems, affecting households and industries. Rahman acknowledged the difficulties and apologised in August 2026 for the suffering caused by power and gas shortages, assuring that his government was taking steps to restore energy supply.

== Approval rating ==
Polling firm/Link	Fieldwork date	Date published	Sample size	Margin of Error	Approval		Disapproval		"Can't say" / Neutral		No answer		Net approval	
Polling firm/Link	Fieldwork date	Date published	Sample size	Margin of Error	Politics	Economy	Politics	Economy	Politics	Economy	Politics	Economy	Politics	Economy
Doppler Opinion Research	6 - 15 August 2026	19 August 2026	3,343	± 1.69%.	54.5%		32.9%		12.6%		-	-	21.6%	
International Republican Institute	16 May – 24 June 2026	9 August 2026	5,000	± 1.7%	40%	49%	51%	45%	-	-	8%	6%	-11%	+4%
The Deltagram	12 – 24 June 2026	7 July 2026	3,000	± 2.12%	75.3%		17.5%		7.2%		–		+67.8%	

== See also ==
- List of prime ministers of Bangladesh
- Premiership of Khaleda Zia
- Presidency of Ziaur Rahman
- Interim government of Muhammad Yunus
