= Caretaker government of Bangladesh =

Form of government in Bangladesh

Caretaker government of the People's Republic of Bangladesh
- গণপ্রজাতন্ত্রী বাংলাদেশের তত্ত্বাবধায়ক সরকার
- Seal of the Chief Adviser

- Flag of the Chief Adviser
- Term length: 3 months (Or until another General Election is held)
- Formation: 26 March 1996; 30 years ago (original); December 17, 2024; 20 months ago (revival)
- First holder: Muhammad Habibur Rahman (1996)
- Final holder: Fakhruddin Ahmed (2007-2009)
- Abolished: 10 May 2011; 15 years ago (original)

A caretaker government of Bangladesh (Bengali: বাংলাদেশের তত্ত্বাবধায়ক সরকার) is a non-political interim government in Bangladesh tasked with organizing free and fair general elections. The Chief Adviser, the head of government in lieu of the Prime Minister, is appointed by the President. The Chief Advisor appoints other advisers, who act as ministers. The appointments are intended to be nonpartisan.

The caretaker government is only permitted to make necessary policy decisions, and may not contest the elections.

== History ==
=== 1996 constitutional amendment ===
Khaleda Zia of the Bangladesh Nationalist Party (BNP) was elected as Prime Minister of Bangladesh for the first time by the 1991 general election. She was elected again in the following February 1996 general election. The election was organized by Zia's government rather than a neutral caretaker government and was boycotted by the major opposition parties − the Awami League, Jatiya Party and Jamaat-e-Islami. Without major competition, the BNP won a landslide victory and Zia was re-elected. The opposition demanded new elections under a caretaker government. Civil unrest led to these demands being met in late March and an Awami League victory in the June 1996 general election.

On 28 March, the 13th amendment to the Constitution of Bangladesh introduced the practice of non-partisan caretaker governments for the holding of general elections.

=== 2006–2008 caretaker government ===
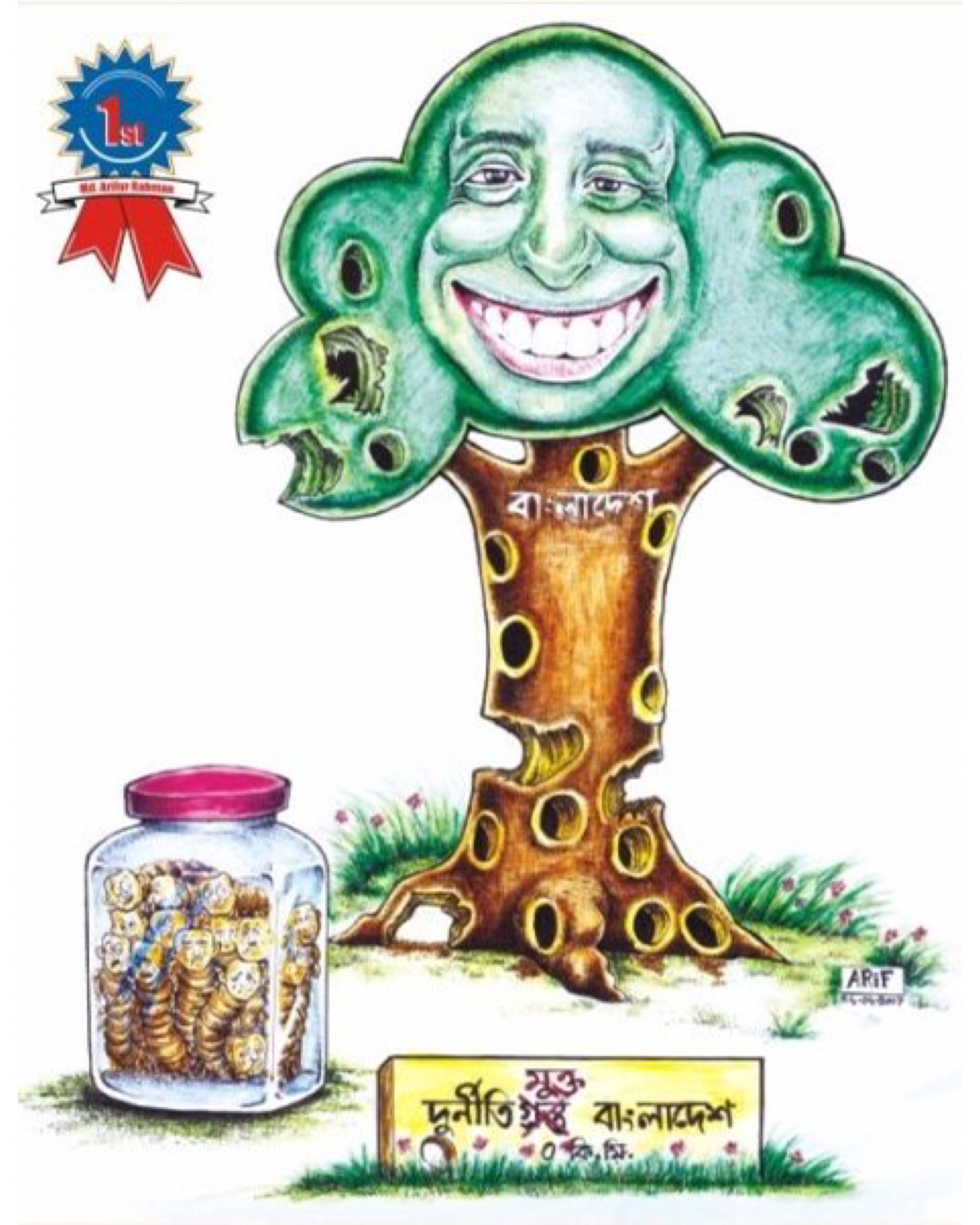
A cartoon from the caretaker government period of Bangladesh in 2007 that describes the massive arrest of corrupt politicians. Cartoon by Arifur Rahman

In late 2006, President Iajuddin Ahmed formed a caretaker government. Chief Justice K.M. Hasan was unable to fill the role of Chief Advisor; according to the Awami League, the outgoing government — controlled by Zia's BNP — appointed Hasan as Chief Justice to influence the caretaker government. The dispute resulted in violent unrest and the cancellation of the January 2007 general election.

Fakhruddin Ahmed formed a new caretaker government in January 2007 backed by the Bangladesh Armed Forces. The caretaker government maintained a limited state of emergency while arresting Awami and BNP members for corruption. The caretaker government was replaced after the 2008 general election, having exceeded the constitutionally-mandated term limit of 120-days.

=== Abolition ===
In 2011, the Prime Minister Sheikh Hasina's Awami League-led government abolished caretaker governments with the 15th constitutional amendment. This amendment was opposed by the BNP and other parties. According to Hasina, the courts could dissolve parliament. According to Ershad in 2012, there was popular support for caretaker governments.

=== Revival ===
Following the High Court Division's verdict, several sections of the Fifteenth Amendment were scrapped on 17 December 2024, restoring the caretaker system.

== Process ==
The scope of caretaker government was defined in the 13th constitutional amendment. There were six options for the appointment of Chief Advisor, with the President being the last. The caretaker government had to hold elections within 90 days, and hand over power to the newly-elected government within 120 days. It was responsible for maintaining day-to-day government operations, routine duties, and organizing general elections.
