= Presidency of Ziaur Rahman =

Period of Government of Bangladesh from 1977 to 1981

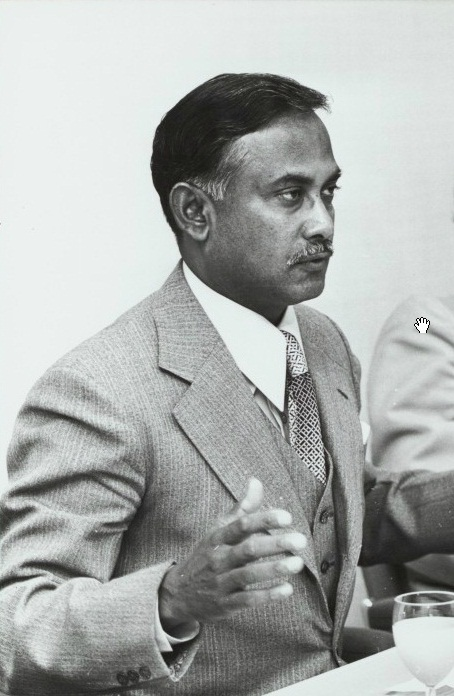
- Presidency of Ziaur Rahman; 21 April 1977 – 30 May 1981
- President: Ziaur Rahman
- Prime Minister: Mashiur Rahman (acting); Shah Azizur Rahman
- Cabinet: Zia
- Party: Bangladesh Nationalist Party
- Election: 1977, 1978
- Seat: Bangabhaban

Ziaur Rahman's tenure as the President of Bangladesh started with his acquisition of the presidency from Abu Sadat Mohammad Sayem on 21 April 1977, after the latter resigned from his position on health grounds. Zia became the president of Bangladesh at a time when Bangladesh was suffering from a host of challenges that included low productivity, a food shortage that resulted in a famine in 1974, unsatisfactory economic growth, severe corruption and a polarized and turbulent political atmosphere after the assassination of Sheikh Mujibur Rahman and his family members in a coup that was followed by a series of counter-coups. He is credited as a solid administrator with pragmatic policies who contributed to the economic recovery of Bangladesh by liberalizing trade and promoting private sector investments.

During his presidency, Bangladesh started the export of manpower to Middle Eastern countries, which eventually became Bangladesh's major source of foreign remittances and transformed the rural economy of the country. Besides, it was during his tenure that Bangladesh started exporting ready-made garments to take advantage of the multi-fibre agreement, a sector that made up 84% of the total export in Bangladesh as of 2023. The share of customs duty and sales tax in the total tax of Bangladesh grew from 39% in 1974 to 64% in 1979, which reflects a massive surge in economic activities inside the country. During his presidency, Bangladesh's agricultural output grew two to three-fold within five years. Jute became profitable for the first time in independent Bangladesh's history in 1979.

Zia's tenure as president saw a series of deadly coups in the Bangladesh Army that threatened his life. He suppressed the coups with brute force, and after each coup, secret trials were held inside the cantonment according to military law. But he ran out of luck on 30 May 1981, when some military men forced their way inside the Chittagong Circuit House and killed him there. He received a state funeral in Dhaka on 2 June 1981, which was attended by hundreds and thousands of people, making it one of the largest funerals in the history of the world.

South Asia specialist William B. Milam said, "It is hard to imagine what would have happened to Bangladesh had Ziaur Rahman been assassinated in 1975 instead of 1981. A failed state on the model of Afghanistan or Liberia might well have resulted. Zia saved Bangladesh from that fate."

== Accession to presidency ==
=== Bangladesh after independence ===
After the independence of Bangladesh, chaos and power struggles between different groups ensued. Political murders became a common thing, and productivity of key industries did not return to the pre-independence level. Despite the funnelling of million dollar-worth of aid, Bangladesh was in acute shortage of foreign currency, and political patronage made it difficult to distribute the aid to the poorest quintile of the citizens. In 1974, after a devastating flood despite the availability of food grains, a famine began that killed around a million. Sheikh Mujibur Rahman, the then Prime Minister of Bangladesh, in a desperate bid to save the situation, amended the constitution and "institutionalized autocracy" by making him effectively the "unimpeachable" President and curtailed the freedom of the judiciary and press.

Eight months after the constitutional amendment, he was killed along with his family members in a pre-dawn coup on August 15, 1975, that threw the country into deeper turmoil. A section of his colleagues from the Awami League, backed by his killers, took charge of the state under the leadership of Khondaker Mostaq Ahmed, his longtime friend.

On November 3, a counter-coup led by the Chief of General Staff of the Bangladesh Army, Brigadier General Khaled Mosharraf put the Chief of Army, Major General Ziaur Rahman, under house arrest, made himself the chief of the army, and replaced President Mostaq Ahmed with his nominee Abu Sadat Mohammad Sayem. But before he could consolidate his grip over the situation, 7 November 1975 was staged orchestrated by retired Lt. Colonel Abu Taher on November 7, but by followers of Zia within the army, freed Zia and reinstated him as the chief of army staff.

=== Military administration and presidential crisis ===
After the uprising of November 7, a military administration was formed, with President Abu Sadat Mohammad Sayem as the chief martial law administrator. Ziaur Rahman, the chief of the Army, became a deputy chief martial law administrator along with the two other chiefs of the Navy and Air Force. However, Bangladesh's constitution did not have any provision for these arrangements.

President Sayem formed a board of advisors to run the country where Zia was bestowed with the portfolio of Finance, Home affairs, Information and Broadcasting. The new president declared a date for the national election. However, most of the political parties were against the election, as they were largely unprepared compared to their rival BAKSAL. This made the situation difficult for the president.

In early 1977, the president was diagnosed with a problem in his gallbladder, and his doctor advised him to go for long rest, compelling him to think of retiring from his position. On April 20 of the year, his advisors, led by Abdus Sattar came to see him and advised him to resign in favour of Ziaur Rahman. President Sayem summoned Ziaur Rahman and requested Zia to replace him as President.

On April 21, President Sayem resigned, and transferred the presidency of Bangladesh to Ziaur Rahman.

== Referendum and elections ==
=== 1977 Confidence referendum ===
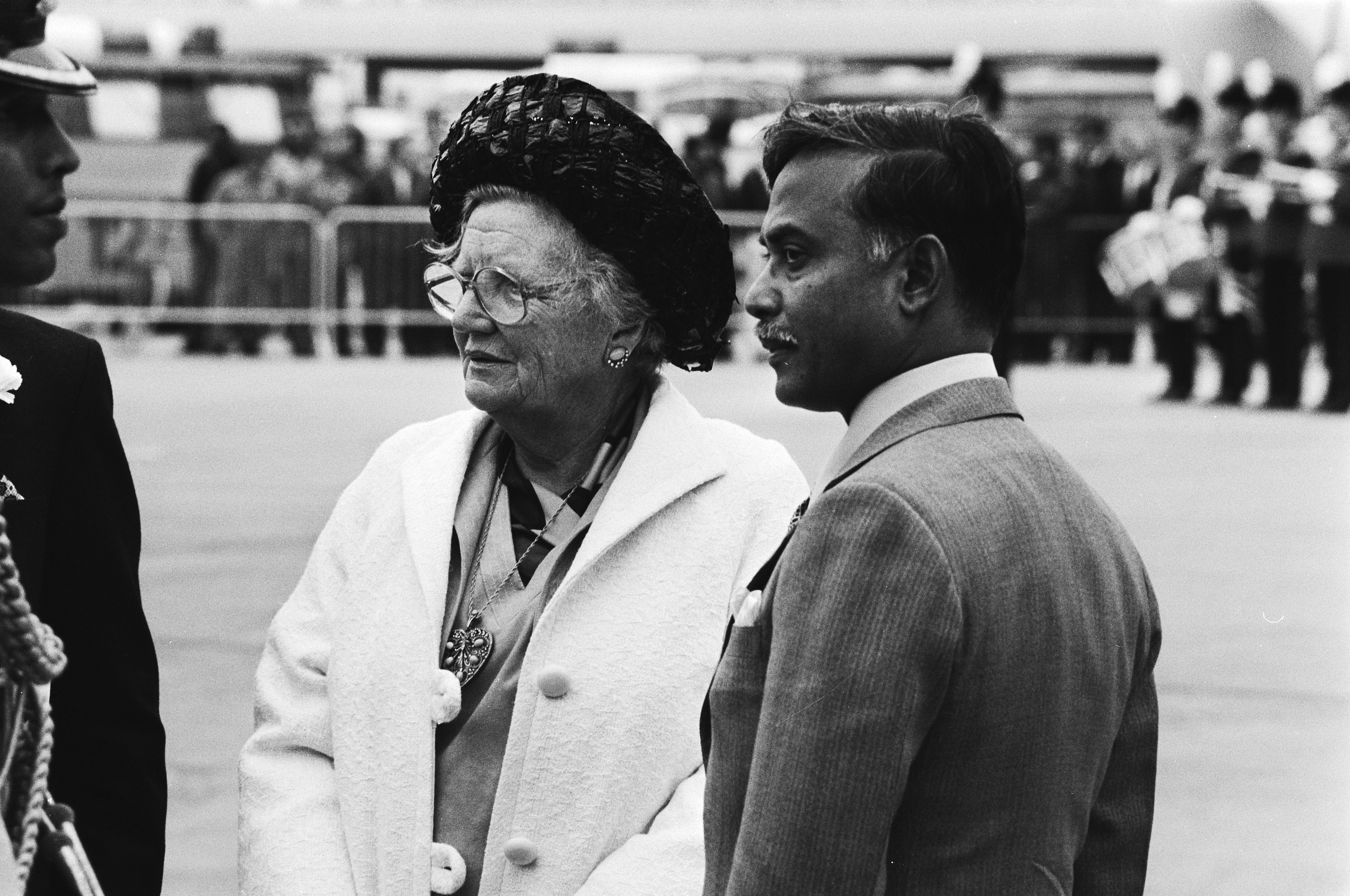
Juliana of the Netherlands and Ziaur Rahman 1979

Less than 24 hours after his taking charge as the president of Bangladesh, Zia declared he would hold a confidence referendum to know the view of the people about his government. Critics suggest that the confidence referendum was his bid to legitimize his presidency.

The referendum, which was held on May 30, 1977, stunned the political commentators and observers. Voters were asked, "Do you have confidence in President Major General Ziaur Rahman BU and the policies and programs adopted by him?" Zia got 98.87% of the votes, according to the Election Commission of Bangladesh, with only 1% of voters opposing his views, which raised serious questions about the process.

As controversy engulfed the referendum, Zia declared a hold a popular vote in the next year.

=== 1978 Presidential election ===
After the independence, Bangladesh opted for parliamentary democracy, where people elected a representative for their constituency, and these representatives, known as members of parliament, elected the president of the state, which was a titular position compared to the Prime Minister. But after the fourth amendment of the constitution, Bangladesh effectively became a democracy with a Presidential system of government.

This presidential election was the first presidential election to be held in Bangladesh after the transformation. Zia, a war hero, joined the race as the candidate of the Jatiyabadi Front (lit. 'Nationalist Front'), an alliance of six parties that included pro-Islam parties like the Muslim League on the one hand and minority-led parties like the Scheduled Caste Federation, on the other hand. His prime challenger was the commander-in-chief of the Bangladesh liberation forces in 1971, General M.A.G. Osmani, backed by the Ganatantrik Oikya Jote (lit. 'Democratic Unity Front'), a platform of the Awami League and some leftist parties.

Zia bagged around 76% of the votes, while General Osmani managed to convince 21% of the voters, according to the tallies shared by the authority. Supporters of Osmani claimed that the election was rigged and incidents of stuffing ballot boxes took place across the country. However, an analysis of the results shows that the election was largely fair, and in some of the Awami League-dominated districts like Gopalganj, Ziaur Rahman received as little as 16% of the total votes. Zia bagged a huge number of votes in the areas where the Muslim League fared well in the 1946 Indian provincial elections. Winning the election gave Zia some sort of legitimacy to run Bangladesh as its president.

== Key reforms ==
Ziaur Rahman is credited with leading some of the key reforms that eventually shaped the economy and societies of Bangladesh. These reforms include the liberalization of trade, economic activities, and promoting entrepreneurship, resulting in export-led growth.

=== Liberalization of economy ===
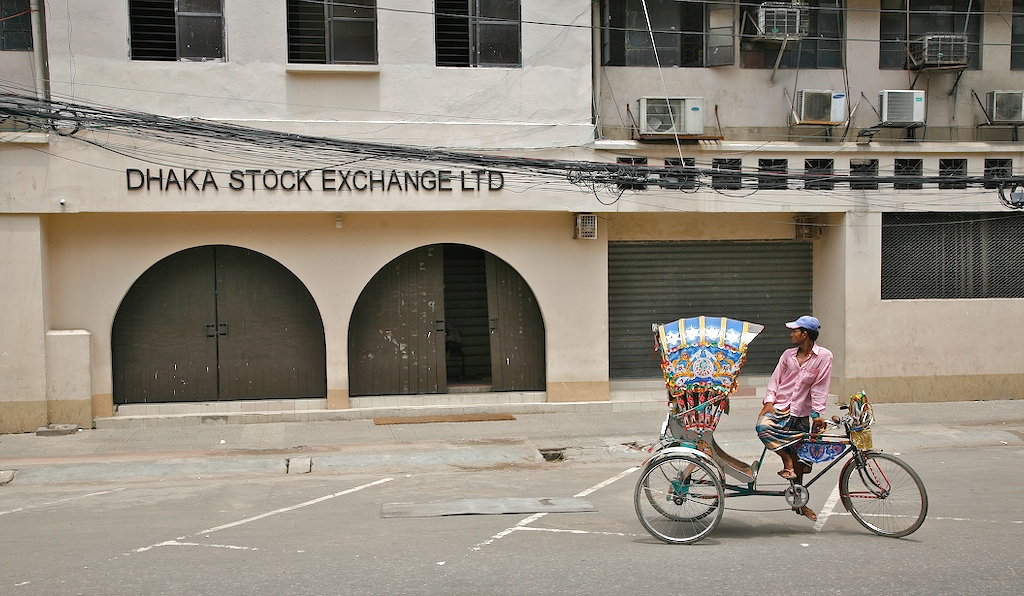
Zia reopened the Dhaka Stock Exchange in 1977

Ziaur Rahman presided over the transformation of Bangladesh from a socialist planned economy to a capitalist open economy from 1977 to 1981. Zia was generally considered "pro-market" and laissez-faire, although other scholarships consider him a social liberal who moved Bangladesh away from the Mujib era interventionist economy to a Western European style socially fair economy.

Privatization
When he came to power, 92% of the industrial sector was under public ownership due to the policy of nationalization imposed by the Sheikh Mujibur Rahman government. The Mujib government nationalized 18 heavy industries, including steel, petrochemicals, mining and power. The Ziaur Rahman-led government denationalized at least 10 sectors and introduced provisions to hand over the ownership of certain industries to local entrepreneurs and support them with funds. Apart from that, the Bengali industrialists who lost their industries to the government due to the nationalization policy were compensated.

The first sector to be privatized was the tanneries, as most of them were under lock and key after the wholesale nationalization of industries. One of the first few tanneries to be privatized was the Orient Tanneries, which was bought by Syed Manzur Elahi, a young businessman, who transformed it into the Apex tanneries and started exporting processed leather soon. The contribution of the leather industry to Bangladesh's export earnings grew from 4.6% to 10.1% between 1973 and 1983 after the tanneries were privatized.

Promoting investment and trade
In 1972, the ceiling for private investment was initially only 2.5 million BDT, restricting private investments. As a part of the liberalization efforts led by President Zia, the ceiling on private investment was abolished in 1978.

Dhaka Stock Exchange, which was shut down after the independence under the socialist programme of Sheikh Mujib, was reopened to bring in the idle money and savings to the mainstream investment scenario. The first international bank, the Bank of Credit and Commerce International (now Eastern Bank Limited), was granted to open a branch in Dhaka. The development policies were designed to support entrepreneurs. Investment Corporation of Bangladesh was established to promote investments and bridge financing.

The government of Bangladesh imposed 100% export duty on wet leather in 1977 so that tanneries would feel encouraged to produce crust and finished leather goods. Awards for best exporters were introduced to encourage businessmen and entrepreneurs.

=== Industrialization ===
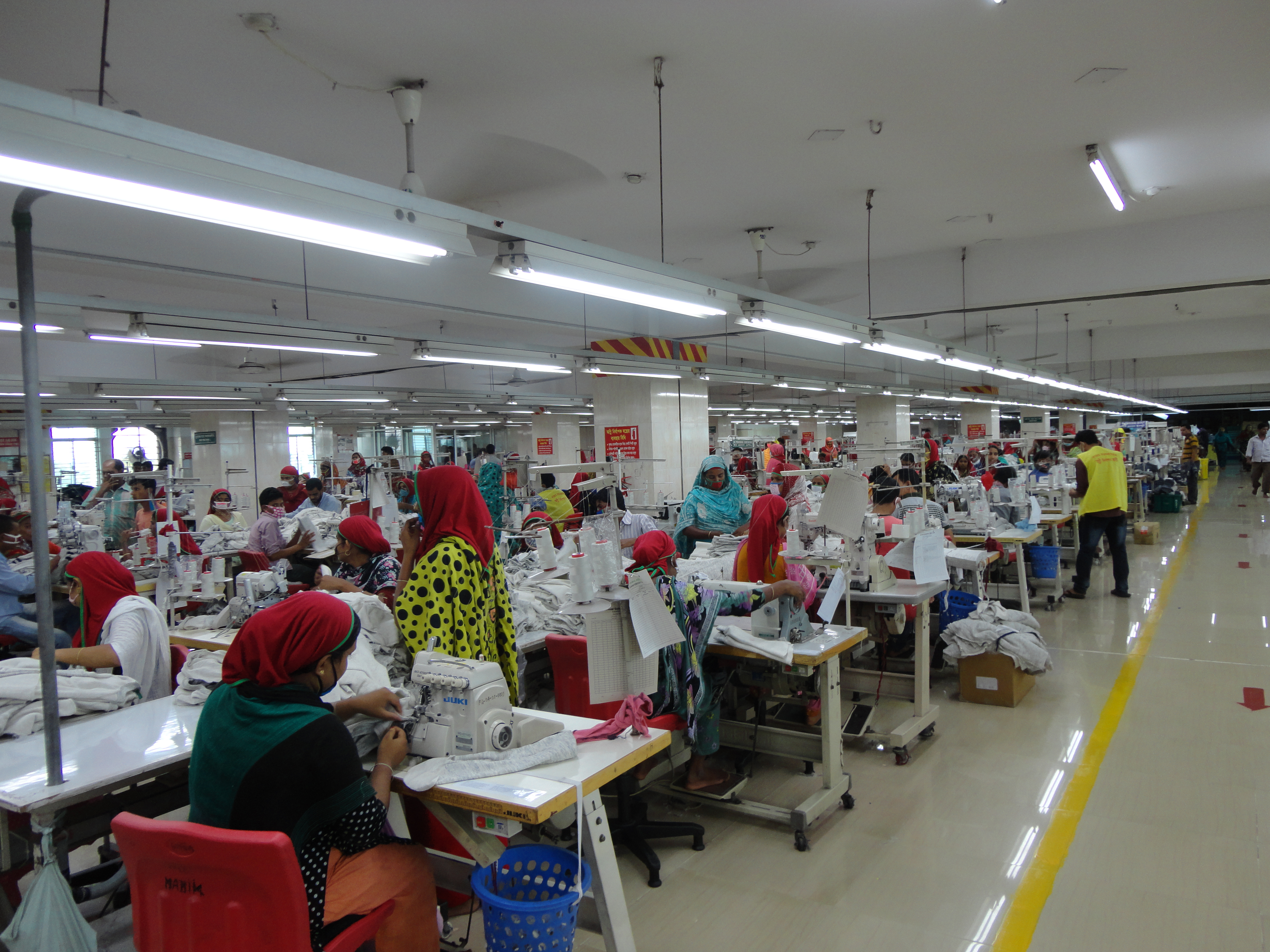
Bangladesh's RMG sector started during Zia's presidency

Ziaur Rahman's presidency was marked by the beginning of the ready-made garments industry that eventually transformed Bangladesh's economy. His government drafted some crucial policies to promote industrialization in Bangladesh.

Establishment of the RMG sector
Ziaur Rahman's presidency was marked by the beginning of the ready-made garments industry, which eventually transformed Bangladesh's economy. The first export-oriented RMG factory to be established in Bangladesh was Desh Garments of Desh Group by Noorul Quader Khan. It was made possible by the partnership with the famous Daewoo Corporation of South Korea, which was looking for an alternative country to East Asian countries to set up a factory.

When they approached the Bangladesh government with the proposal, Ziaur Rahman decided to support the initiative and linked the officials of Daewoo with Nurul Quader Khan and his team. Daewoo invested in Desh Garments and trained their staff, who would later start their own ready-made garment factories. Zia's support assured the South Koreans that unexpected institutional problems would be dealt with accordingly, which inspired them to invest in Bangladesh.

Besides to support local RMG factories, the Zia government introduced a back-to-back letter of credit facility and provisions for bonded warehouses. Income tax on export earnings was withdrawn to support the industry's growth.

Loan and duty support
A seven year tax holiday was declared for new industries, and concessions on electric bills at a preferential rate were declared. In addition to that, the 15-year moratorium on the nationalization of key industries imposed by the previous government was withdrawn. Bangladesh Shilpa Bank and Bangladesh Shilpa Rin Sangstha (Bangladesh Development Bank Limited) were instructed to provide credit support for new investments.

Export processing zone

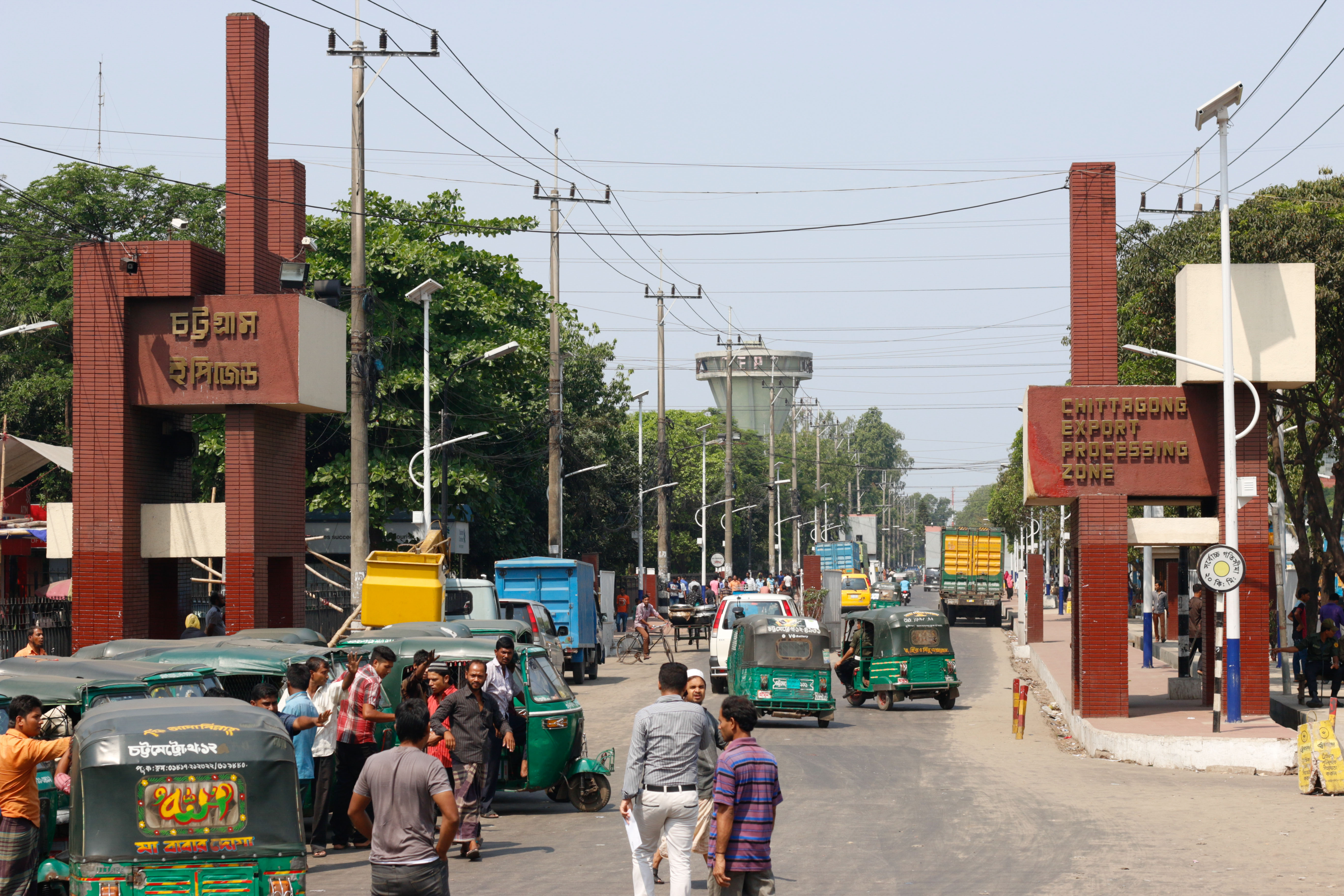
First-ever EPZ of Bangladesh in Chattogram was established by the Zia administration

Ziaur Rahman's government, realizing the need for a special zone to fast-track the industrialization and trade activities, formulated plans to set up export processing zones in Bangladesh. With a view to establishing the EPZs, the Bangladesh Export Processing Zone Authority was established in 1980. The body started its work to establish the first EPZ in Chattogram, which was completed by 1983.

=== Multi-party democracy ===
Ziaur Rahman introduced multi-party democracy, one of the founding principles of Bangladesh, that allowed all the parties to operate freely and participate in the elections. Though this paved the way for some religion-based parties to reorganize themselves, it also provided minority political organizations like the East Bengal Scheduled Castes Federation to join politics. He believed in countering political philosophies with a better philosophy instead of banning them.

=== Agricultural reforms ===
After the liberation war, due to natural disasters and some policy restrictions, harvesting stayed lower than that of the pre-independence level, compelling the country to reach the international donors for large sums of food aid each year. But in 1974, when the famine began, food did not remain a humanitarian problem; it became a political problem. As a result, the Zia-led new government revised some of the previous policies and introduced some reforms to solve the food problem once and for all. President Zia's focus was on increasing cereal production rapidly so that the country could become self-sufficient and less dependent on aid. Scholars agreed that the production grew much faster than the population during the post-1975/76 period.

Canal digging and irrigation
To counter the problem of drought and floods, Ziaur Rahman stressed the importance of digging irrigation canals in every village in the country. The idea was that the canals will store rainwater during the rainy season and prevent flooding, and the same water will be used to irrigate the cultivable lands. To motivate villagers to dig their own canal, a food-for-work program was launched in different areas. Villagers, supervised by the government, dug their own canals that helped them to irrigate their lands. Within years, 2200 miles of new canals were dug across the country.

Besides, the government provided subsidies to the farmers to set up deep tube wells.

Market-driven fertilizer distribution
After the independence, the Bangladesh Agricultural Development Corporation appointed dealers to distribute fertilizers at a subsidized rate to the farmers. But these appointed dealers utilized their monopoly to sell the fertilizers at a higher rate to the farmers, misappropriating the subsidy. In 1978, the new government addressed this issue by removing the process of appointing dealers for fertilizer distribution and relying entirely on the private sector to distribute key fertilizers at a government-administered price. Between 1979 and 1983, BADC's role was restricted to the procurement and wholesale distribution of fertilizer to the local businessmen instead of the few chosen ones.

=== Health sector ===
Bangladesh, with a land size of some 56,000 square miles, was facing serious health problems that included an increasing birth rate, malnutrition, smallpox, chronic diarrhoea and other water-borne diseases, immediately after independence. However, the Mujib government did not seem to be serious about solving the problems. President Zia made some quick efforts to address the problems, particularly in promoting vaccination and birth control that effectively cut population growth.

Population control
In 1974, the population of Bangladesh had a population of around 71,300,000 people, with around 500 people per square kilometre, and the projections of the population by 2003 ranged between 153,400,000 and 187,800,000 putting Bangladesh at risk of a potential food security crisis.

The Zia-led government launched an extensive birth-control campaign personally supervised by President Ziaur Rahman. Around 12,000 family planning officials were appointed by the government to popularise the birth control programs during his presidency. Bangladesh utilized a "Cafeteria Approach", where at one place all sorts of contraceptives were distributed for free. Also, sterlization was promoted with small cash incentives.

Establishing ICDDR,B

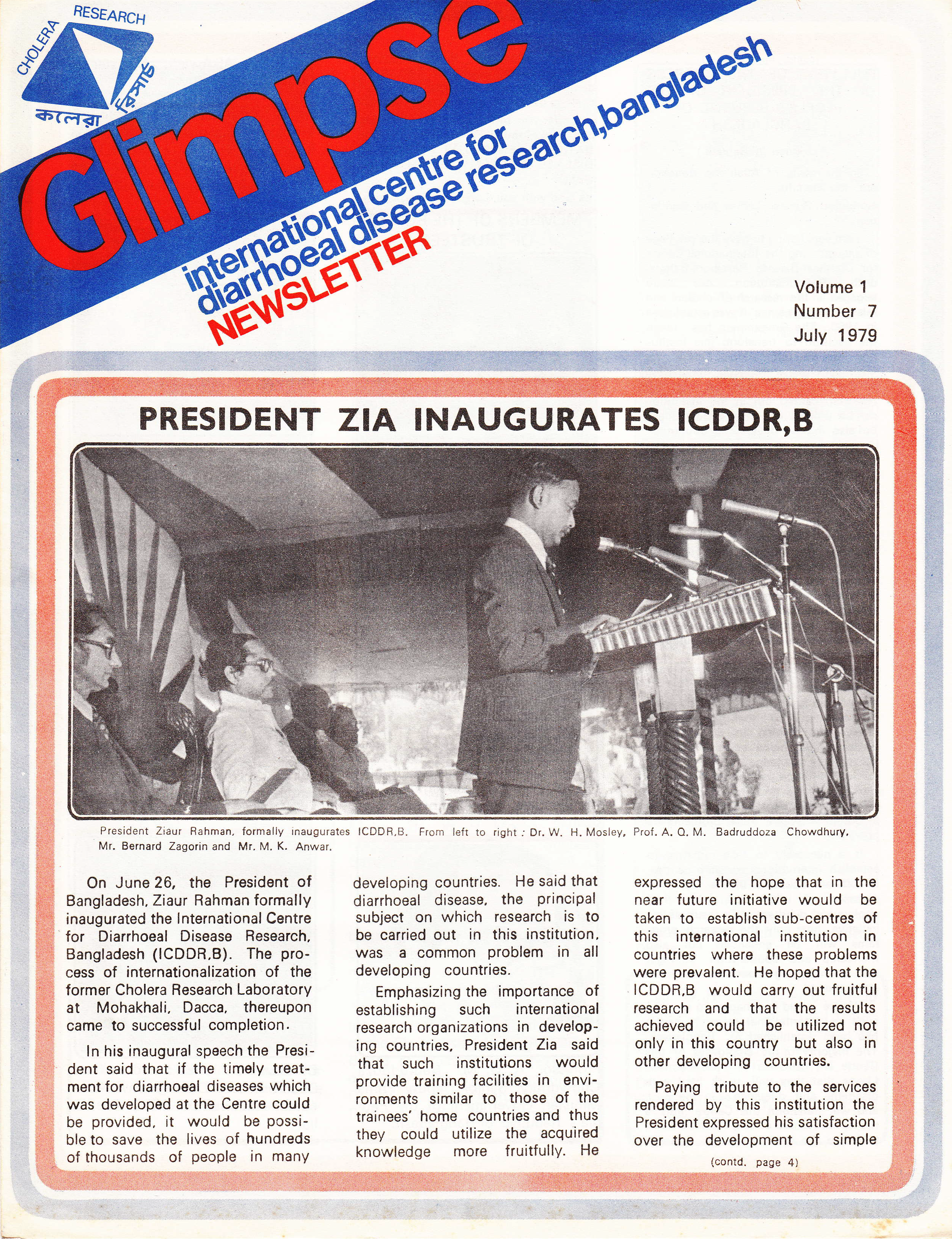
Inauguration of ICDDR,B by Zia

One of Bangladesh's ever persisting problems has been cholera, which caused multiple epidemics in the region. In the 1960s, with the support of the U.S. government, a cholera research laboratory was established in Bangladesh (then East Pakistan). But after independence, due to the tensions between the U.S. and Bangladesh governments, the laboratory struggled to receive the required funds and downsized its activities.

But after the change in government in late 1975, the relationship between Bangladesh and the U.S. was normalized, and western researchers on cholera proposed the formation of an international standard research centre with medical facilities to prevent future Cholera epidemics. The Zia government considered the proposal with utmost priority and passed an act in the parliament to establish the International Centre for Diarrhoeal Disease Research, Bangladesh. The centre was inaugurated by President Zia himself on June 26, 1979, and a trustee board was formed with renowned scientists and experts to run the centre. Eleven of the fourteen members of the founding trustee board were foreign experts and scientists.

Mass immunization
The journey of mass immunization began during the presidency of Ziaur Rahman under the Expanded Programme on Immunization (EPI), which was a global initiative of WHO to provide life-saving vaccines to all children of the world, launched in 1974. Due to the political instability in the early 1970s and lack of infrastructure, Bangladesh was unable to initiate the mass immunization campaign in the first few years. On 7 April 1979, the Expanded Programme of Immunization began in Bangladesh as a pilot projection in eight areas. The programme was designed to provide six conventional vaccines- BCG, DPT, OPV, TT and Measles to all the children of Bangladesh within a few years.

This vaccination programme was later expanded to all the areas of Bangladesh in the next two decades, cutting the child mortality rate significantly.

=== Local development programmes ===
Rural electrification

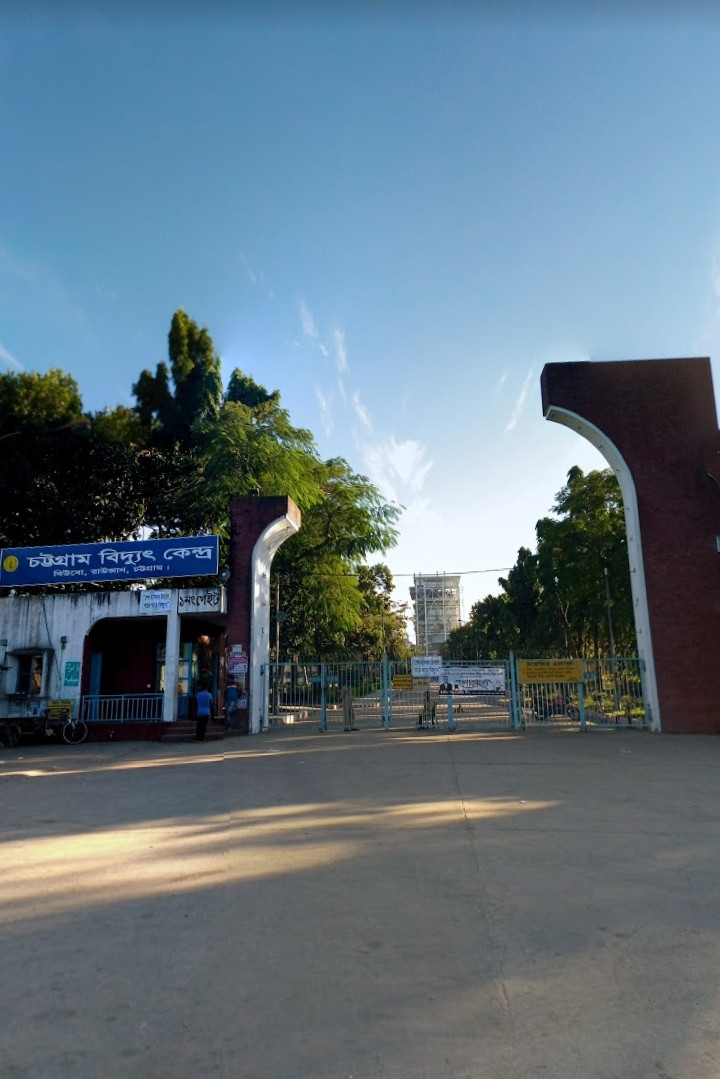
Zia established the Rural Electrification Board in 1977

Electrifying the villages was one of the core policy measures taken by Ziaur Rahman. This is manifested by the establishment of the Rural Electrification Board in 1977 by a presidential ordinance with immediate effect. By January 1978, the REB, a semi-autonomous body, was put into function. To expedite the process of electrification, a provision for establishing Palli Bidyut Samiti was added to the modus operandi of REB. At least 77 Palli Bidyut Samitis were formed soon.

In 1979, during a conversation with BRAC's founder, Fazle Hasan Abed, President Zia claimed that he would electrify all the subdistricts (thana) within five years so that BRAC could launch a massive campaign in collaboration with the government to vaccinate all the children of Bangladesh since vaccines required fridges and sufficient electricity to be stored.

Gram Sarkar
Building institutions is central to ensuring good governance at all levels; therefore, Ziaur Rahman initiated the Swanirbhar Gram Sarkar (lit. 'Self-reliant Village Government') program to allow the villagers to lead the development programmes such as food production, formation of village-based cooperatives, mass literacy, family planning, and maintenance of law and order, in their respective villages. The key idea was to decentralize the development initiatives in the village areas, which were dominated by the local elites who captured the union councils and influenced the development works in their favour.

The programme came into being in 1980 and, despite some drawbacks, created a platform for some of the disadvantaged groups of the villages to be represented. However, there were some nuances in the process, and the platform overlapped with the structures of union councils, creating antagonism between the two bodies. But the enthusiasm that was created by Zia died with his death in May 1981, and eventually it was fully abolished by the Ershad government in 1983.

== Domestic affairs ==
=== Political reconciliation ===
Ziaur Rahman is both credited and criticized for his reconciliation approach in politics. His advisors and cabinet members came from different backgrounds, unlike the Mujib government. On one hand, war heroes who won gallantry awards for their contribution to the Liberation War of 1971, relatives of the martyrs, and organizers of the liberation movement were invited to join the cabinet, and on the other hand, he appointed some senior anti-liberation politicians.

Among the freedom fighters who joined the cabinet of Zia included Akbar Hossain Bir Protik, Abdul Haleem Chowdhury, Zafar Imam Bir Bikram, SA Bari, Nurul Huq, Iqbal Hossain Chowdhury and Nurul Islam Shishu. Some organizers of the liberation movement, including KM Obaidur Rahman, professor Muhammad Yusuf Ali, and Md. Reazuddin Ahmed joined the cabinet as well. Martyred intellectual Altaf Mahmud's cousin, Sirajul Haque Montu, was the textile minister of Zia's cabinet. Taslima Abed, a pioneer women's rights activist who worked for the rehabilitation of rape victims after liberation, was the state minister of women's affairs. Language movement activists Jamal Uddin Ahmed and M. Saifur Rahman joined the cabinet as well.

On the other hand, a member of Pakistan's UN delegation of 1971, Shah Azizur Rahman, was elected as the Prime Minister of Bangladesh by lawmakers during his presidency. Notably, he was granted amnesty and general pardon by Sheikh Mujibur Rahman himself. The anti-liberation Shanti Committee members, Abdur Rahman Biswas and Abdul Aleem held ministerial positions in Zia's cabinet.

Ziaur Rahman, to recognize the country's tribal and religious minority population's participation in government, appointed Rajmata Benita Roy as his advisor and later Aung Shwe Prue Chowdhury as the state minister of Food. He also had Sunil Kumar Gupta, a Hindu leader who was an organizer of the liberation movement, as his state minister of Petroleum and Mineral Resource.

=== Economic management ===
Ziaur Rahman initially relied on Mirza Nurul Huda, one of Bangladesh's most famous economists and an academic with experience running the Finance Ministry of East Pakistan before the liberation war, to restructure the economy, which was in tatters after the flood and famine. The economic growth was 7.8% in 1977-78 fiscal year. The inflation rate, which went up to 62% during the 1974-75 fiscal year, came down sharply but hovered around 12% to 15% during Zia's presidency. Due to the liberalization of trade and manpower exports, foreign reserves grew faster during his tenure. Rate of investment (% of GDP) jumped in the 1979-80 fiscal year. By then, a seasoned chartered accountant, M. Saifur Rahman, took charge of the finance ministry.

=== Manpower export ===
One of the major achievements of the Zia government is manpower export, which initially began in 1976 when he was a deputy CMLA when around 6,000 migrants went to the Middle-East. To formalize the process to export manpower, the Bureau of Manpower Employment and Training was established in the same year. By 1980, a sizeable number of migrants started flying under the agreements with different Arab nations, and in 1981, private agencies were granted permission to export manpower. More than 60 thousand skilled and semi-skilled labours went to the Middle-East in four years.

=== Constitutional amendment ===
One of Zia's most controversial acts was the amendment of the constitution to replace the founding principles of the country and legalise the indemnity act for the killers of Sheikh Mujibur Rahman.

Zia replaced Secularism with "Absolute faith in the Almighty Allah," which helped to bring foreign aid and investment from the Arab world. To distance himself from the Communist bloc, he replaced Socialism with "Economic and Social Justice". Besides, nationalism was defined as Bangladeshi nationalism, instead of Awami League-era Bengali nationalism, providing the citizens of Bangladesh with a distinctive identity.

=== Chittagong Hill Tracts insurgency ===
The insurgency in the Chittagong Hill Tracts was inherited by the Zia government. After the liberation war, the political leadership of the hills were trying to inform the new government of Sheikh Mujibur Rahman about their demands and met him at least three times. At one instance, when Manabendra Narayan Larma went to him with some radical demands, a heated conversation ensued between them, and at one point, according to his brother Shantu Larma, Mujibur Rahman said, "Forget your ethnic identity, become Bengali." He ordered the establishment of three cantonments in Dighinala, Ruma and Alikadam.

This prompted the tribal leadership to found the Parbatya Chattagram Jana Samhati Samiti (PCJSS) in 1972. This organization, after the 1973 election, started an armed wing, Shanti Bahini, to realize their rights through armed struggle against the government. During the liberation war, a portion of the tribal youth populace allied themselves with the Pakistan Army and after the war they went into hiding. These youths were the early recruits of the Shanti Bahini. Later, after the death of Sheikh Mujibur Rahman, with Indian support, Shanti Bahini initiated an insurgency in 1977 by attacking the Bangladesh Army convoys.

Ziaur Rahman saw the problem as an economic problem and invited multiple tribal leaders like Benita Roy and Aung Shwe Prue Chowdhury to his advisory council and cabinet to give them representation in the government and formed the Tribal Convention to initiate a dialogue with the leadership of PCJSS. However, the leadership of PCJSS favoured armed struggle and refused to engage in dialogues. In response, Zia played his population card and brought in a huge number of Bengali-speaking people in the Hill Tracts area who eventually outnumbered the tribal populace, a move that triggered the insurgency further.

=== Rohingya repatriation ===
In 1977, when the Burmese Armed Forces launched the infamous Operation Dragon King to expel the local Muslim Rohingya population, an influx of displaced migrants poured into Bangladesh for shelter. Around 200,000 Rohingyas entered Bangladesh in a span of a year, which created a major refugee crisis in Bangladesh. Ziaur Rahman, as the president, took this issue to the global level and asked for the UN, OIC and Western bloc's support to solve the problem. OIC, most notably Saudi Arabia and Libya, actively supported Bangladesh in the negotiations with the Burmese government.

At one instance, during a meeting between Ziaur Rahman and General Ne Win, Zia threatened to provide the Rohingyas with arms and training to Rohingyas, if they refused to take them back, Myanmar agreed to sign an agreement and took back almost all Rohingyas by 1979 and accepted them as legal residents, something which they were initially denying.

=== Coups and secret trials ===
From 1976 to 1981, at least fifteen military coups were organized within the Bangladesh Armed Forces to topple Ziaur Rahman. In March 1976, soldiers killed three senior officers of the army in the port city of Chattogram. This was followed by a coup attempt led by Sheikh Mujibur Rahman's assassin, Syed Faruque Rahman, in the Bogra Cantonment in the last week of April 1976, supported by the Air Force Chief MG Tawab. In July 1976, Bogra Cantonment mutinied again. Another uprising took place in Bogra Cantonment in September 1977, and on October 2, 1977, the airmen of signal corps staged a coup and lined up around twenty ranked Air Force officials and killed them.

Zia responded with force. He disbanded one of the most mutinous units, the Bengal Lancers, and put the soldiers on trial. This unit was also involved in the assassination of Sheikh Mujib. However, he allowed their leader, Colonel Faruque, to leave the country to calm the soldiers in April 1976. He also forced the Air Force chief and patronizer of the Faruque-Rashid duo, MG Tawab, to resign and sent him to Germany. To tackle the 1977 coups, which killed senior military and air force officers and almost brought down his government, he sent the 9th Infantry Division to confront them under Mir Shawkat Ali. The mutineers and the government forces met each other at the Dhaka Airport, where the military overpowered the mutineers and shot many of them dead. After the coups, the mutineers were put on secret trial, and at least 561 of them were hanged to death after court martial.

Zia, however, honoured the Indemnity Ordinance, 1975, declared by Khondaker Mostaq Ahmad by legalizing it and did not take any action against the coup leaders of the 1975 coups, both of August 15 and November 3. But he put the leader of the November 7 coup, Colonel (retd) Abu Taher, on trial and executed him. A Bangladesh court later declared the execution illegal.

== Foreign affairs ==
The Zia government's foreign policy was more inclined to develop strong ties with the west and the Middle East, contrary to the Mujib government that opted for the Soviet bloc. This change in policy was economically more profitable for Bangladesh as the country received a significant amount of aid and credit support, which was used to develop factories, roads and research institutes.

=== United Nations ===
Bangladesh became a member of the UN Security Council under Zia's leadership in 1979. He addressed the UN General Assembly in 1980 as the president of Bangladesh, where he urged oil-producing countries to be more sensitive towards the under-developed countries and offer oil at a lower rate. Bangladesh pushed further in this regard and put forward the Brandt Commission's findings on the interdependence of North and South and proposed OPEC sell their oil to the developing countries at half of the international rate and invest in the developing countries.

When the Soviet invasion of Afghanistan started in December 1979, Bangladesh was among the first few countries to call for the withdrawal of all foreign troops from Afghanistan and remained active to retain stability in South Asia.

=== OIC and the Arab world ===
Bangladesh under Zia made it a priority to strengthen its relationship with the oil-rich Arab nations and the Organisation of Islamic Cooperation. It was considered essential to fund the development projects in Bangladesh and send more migrants to the Middle East who can send the much-needed remittance back to Bangladesh.

Organization of Islamic Cooperation
Bangladesh became a member of the Al-Quds Committee, one of the four standing committees of the Organization of Islamic Cooperation under the leadership of Ziaur Rahman, to address the problems of Palestine. He was the member of the Summit committee, and in that capacity, Ziaur Rahman attended the fifth session of the Al-Quds Committee in April 1981, and after his consultation with King Hassan II and President Ahmed Sékou Touré, the other two members of the committee, they adopted a resolution with 30 recommendations to solve the Palestine problem and presented them to the United Nations. Zia was also a member of the Islamic Peace Commission at the time of his death in 1981.

After Zia's death, the OIC adopted Resolution 1/12 OR.G. to condemn the Assassination of Ziaur Rahman. The OIC recalled his "immense contribution to the Islamic Ummah, his untiring efforts till his martyrdom to further the cause of peace and security of the Muslim countries" The resolution mentioned Zia a martyr or Shahid, a respectable person who died for a cause and whose place in Paradise is promised according to the verses in the Quran.

Saudi Arabia
Some of the Arab countries, including Saudi Arabia, did not recognize Bangladesh till the death of Sheikh Mujibur Rahman and had hostile views toward Bangladesh due to the presence of 'Secularism' in the constitution and the ban on religion-based politics.

Ziaur Rahman made considerable efforts to break the ice with the Saudis. He replaced 'Secularism' in the constitution with 'Absolute faith in Allah' and lifted the ban on religion-based politics to appease the Saudis, and visited Saudi Arabia as a guest of the state in July 1977. In December 1978, the Saudi Minister for Finance and National Economy visited Bangladesh, and the visit marked the establishment of a joint commission for promoting bilateral relations and strengthening cooperation. Saudi Arabia committed US$300 million to Bangladesh as grants and interest-free loans and promised to finance the implementation of the second five-year plan from 1980 to 1985 to Zia's minister Abdul Aleem who led a delegate in late 1979.

Saudi Arabia also employed many skilled and semi-skilled migrants from Bangladesh, and in the first three months of 1978, they sent US$1,431,265 as remittance, boosting Bangladesh's economy significantly.

United Arab Emirates
The government led by Zia tried to maintain the relationship with the highest level of the United Arab Emirates ruling elites and made a stopover in March 1978, where he reiterated his commitment to the Islamic principles. Exports to the UAE, as a result, grew five times with Zia as the deputy Chief Martial Law Administrator in charge of the Finance Ministry, and the export earning almost doubled, from 2,507,000 BDT to 3,834,000 BDT when he became the president in 1978. Bangladesh used to export tea, live animals, handicrafts, cables and wires, and a wide range of products to the UAE in late 1970s. In 1977, the UAE provided Bangladesh with 600,000 tons of oil in short-term credit to meet the urgent needs of the country. In the first quarter of 1978, Bangladesh received US$2 million in remittances from the Bangladeshi migrants in the UAE.

Iran
One of the most notable global events that Ziaur Rahman's presidency saw was the Iranian Revolution in 1979 that significantly changed the politics in the Arab world. Before the revolution, Bangladesh signed a Memorandum of Understanding with the Iranian government led by Mohammad Reza Pahlavi to send 24,000 workers to Iran. The deal was honoured by the Ayatollah Khomeini administration, and Bangladesh stayed neutral during the hostage crisis.

=== Western bloc ===
During the Cold War era, the North American states, along with their allies in West Europe and the Pacific Ocean, were identified as the Western Bloc. Three of the five veto nations were part of this bloc with significant hold in global politics, and hence Ziaur Rahman put serious efforts to build strong ties with the Western Bloc to attain both moral and economic support. Most importantly, Zia's government prioritized the relationship with the United States, the United Kingdom, and France. Zia is the first Bangladeshi President to be invited to both the White House and Élysée Palace.

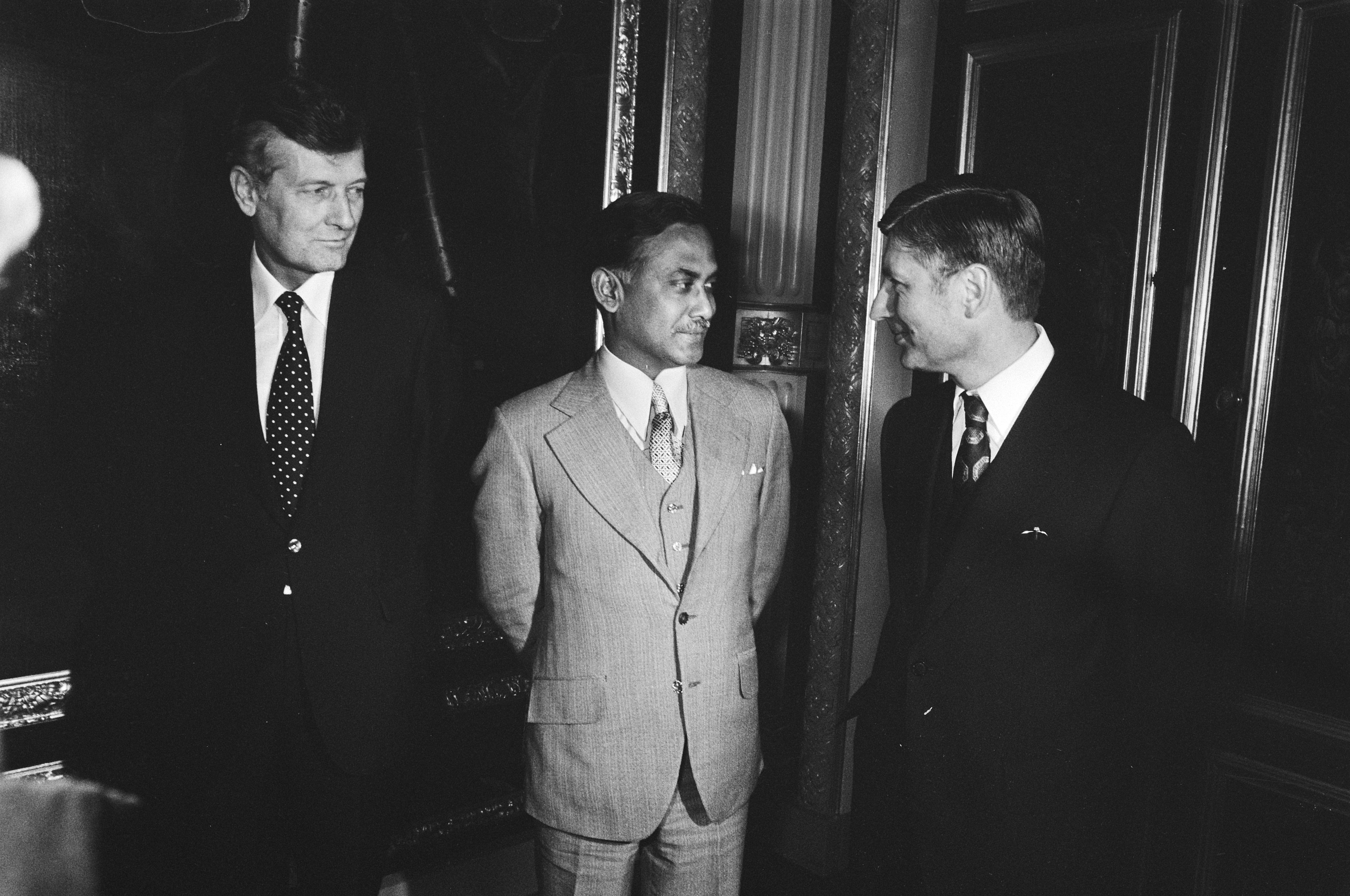
Ziaur Rahman having a chat with the Netherlands' Prime Minister Dries van Agt

United States of America
Ziaur Rahman is the first Bangladeshi head of state to be invited to the White House by a U.S. president. He visited the White House on 27 August 1980. President Jimmy Carter appreciated Zia's ambition to make Bangladesh a self-sufficient country in food production and thanked him for his statesman-like role in the UN Security Council. Zia used to exchange letters with President Jimmy Carter on development issues. The U.S. commitment for aid support to Bangladesh grew from US$87 million to US$1.5 billion in 1980 after his visit.

The USAID provided the funds and support to convert the Cholera Research Lab into an international research center, ICDDR,B. The U.S. government provided constant food aid support throughout the tenure of Ziaur Rahman that helped Bangladesh feed a large population of 90 million. Besides, the U.S. government was extremely supportive of Zia's move for privatization and the introduction of a pro-market economy, and Bangladesh started getting the benefits of the Multi-Fibre Agreement by exporting ready-made garments to the U.S.

Immediately after Zia's death in 1981, President Ronald Reagan expressed his shock and claimed that he was deeply grieved after learning of the incident. President Reagan also mentioned that the wisdom of Ziaur Rahman in internal affairs will be sorely missed after his tragic death.

France
Bangladesh was keen to develop an economic relationship with France, and some high-level visits took place during the presidency of Ziaur Rahman to France. Bangladesh's Foreign Minister Professor Muhammad Shamsul Huq went to France in May 1978 for a three-day visit, which was followed by a two-day visit of the prime Minister Shah Azizur Rahman in 1979. In August 1980, Ziaur Rahman made a stopover in France and was invited to the Élysée Palace by President Valéry Giscard d'Estaing as the first President of Bangladesh to be invited to the presidential palace of France. The two presidents had lunch there and, at the end of the day, signed two bilateral agreements, one on financial cooperation, the other relating to cooperation in the nuclear field, in particular, to work on the development of a nuclear power plant in Rooppur.

=== Eastern Bloc ===
The Eastern Bloc during the Cold War consisted of the now defunct Soviet Union and their allies of the Warsaw Pact, namely Czechoslovakia, Romania, Albania, Hungary, Poland and East Germany.

Soviet Union
Bangladesh's relations with the leader of the Eastern Bloc, the Soviet Union, deteriorated after the Assassination of Sheikh Mujibur Rahman. Though the Soviet Union supported Bangladesh during the liberation war and helped Bangladesh to recover from the devastation in the initial days by sending their navy to clean up the mines of Chattagram port area, their support fell short to prevent the famine of 1974, and Bangladesh had to look for support from the U.S. and their allies.

Zia government kept the Soviet Union at arm's length and developed close ties with the Western Bloc. The replacing of Socialism with Economic and Social Justice, and introducing Absolute Faith in Allah instead of Secularism as state principle, irked the Soviet leadership. Ziaur Rahman decisively sided with the Western Bloc, upsetting the Soviet Union in 1979 during the Soviet invasion in Afghanistan, and demanded the withdrawal of foreign troops from Afghanistan.

However, cooperation on the political and economic fronts continued. Soviet Deputy Foreign Minister Nikolay Firyubin visited Dhaka in December 1976, and Bangladesh's Information Minister Habibullah Khan visited Moscow in August 1979. In 1981, just before Zia's death, the Soviet Union and Bangladesh concluded two agreements on the expansion of Ghorashal Thermal Power Plant and the establishment of a power station in Siddhirganj.

=== South Asia ===
SAARC
One of the pioneering acts of Ziaur Rahman's foreign policy was the initiative to unite the South Asian countries under one umbrella. He shared his vision of a united South Asia free from unfriendly trade barriers and mutual regional security in a letter that was sent to the governments of India, Pakistan, Nepal, Bhutan, Sri Lanka, and the Maldives. This eventually culminated in the formation of SAARC in 1985, four years after his death. The first meeting of foreign ministers to form SAARC countries was, however, held in 1980.

Afghanistan
During the presidency of Ziaur Rahman, the Soviet Union sent soldiers in Afghanistan to save the government that was loyal to them. Ziaur Rahman was strictly against this move and personally talked to the U.S. and British government on the possibilities to solve the problem. He met Margaret Thatcher on June 16, 1980, and told her that the presence of Soviet troops in Afghanistan is a violation of the fundamental principles of international relations.

== Legacy ==
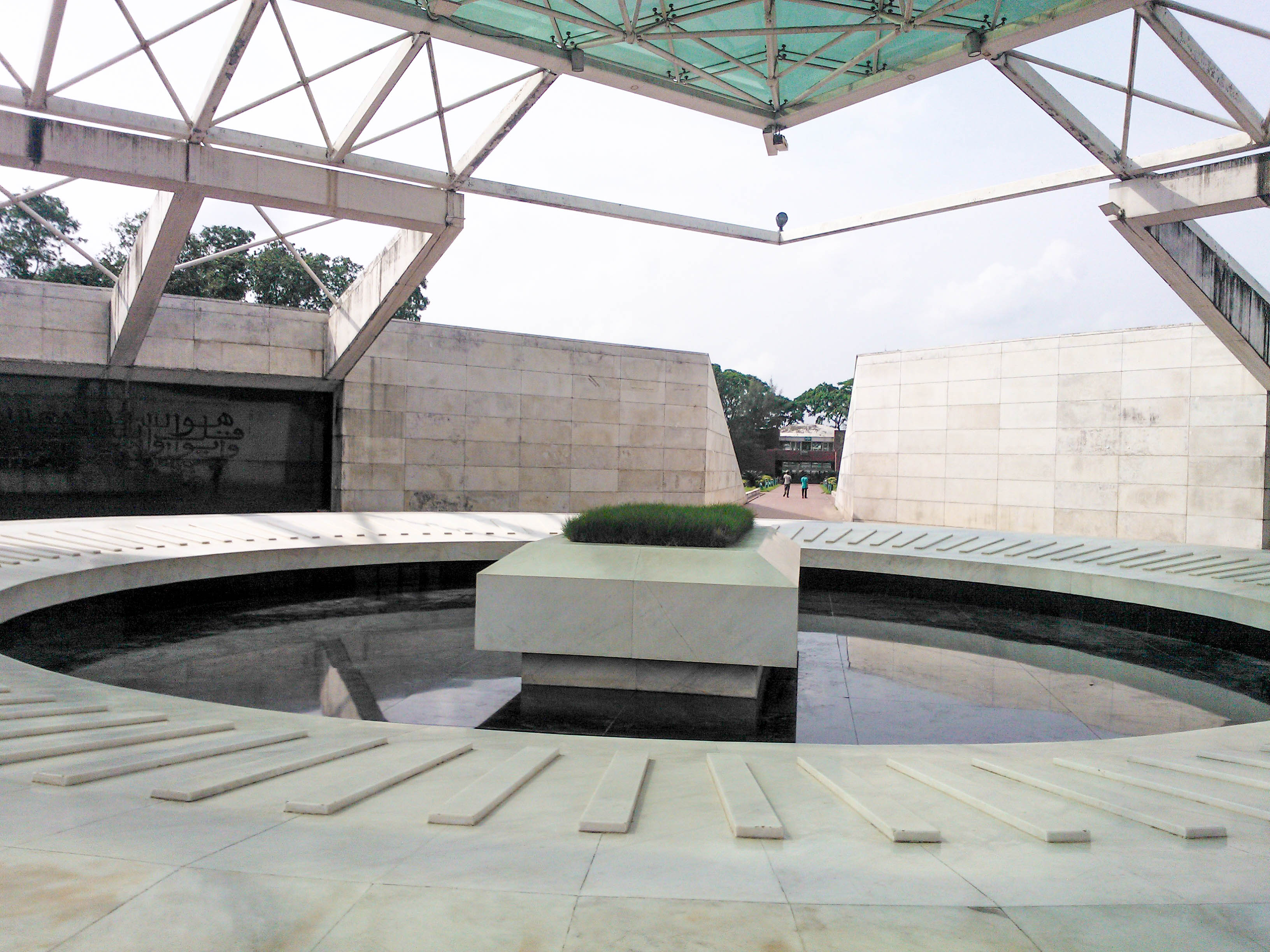
Mausoleum of Ziaur Rahman in Dhaka

The policies of Ziaur Rahman as the president of Bangladesh shaped Bangladesh's economy, politics and society. Successive governments and leaders adopted and endured most of his policies and reforms.

After the fourth amendment of the constitution in January 1975, Bangladesh effectively became a one-party state and institutionalized autocracy. All but four newspapers, all controlled by a state-run trust, were allowed to operate, and BAKSAL emerged as the only legitimate political party in the country, forcing others to go into hiding. These measures weakened the growth of institutions and removed the necessary outlets needed in a democracy to absorb the shocks. After the assassination of President Sheikh Mujibur Rahman and his senior colleagues, Bangladesh fell into a severe leadership crisis. Pro-right elements who were supportive of the coup that killed Sheikh Mujibur Rahman were pushing for establishing an Islamic republic, shifting from the secular ideology of the state. Eminent jurist Muhammad Habibur Rahman opined that the events of the first five years of independent Bangladesh, under Sheikh Mujib and successive governments, took the country to the brink of collapse and people became skeptical of the survival of an independent Bangladesh.

His assumption of power took place against this backdrop of famine, the conversion of Bangladesh into an autocracy and a series of coups that killed hundreds and threw the country into political and social turmoil. Zia is credited with saving the country from descending into more turmoil and not becoming a failed state.

Ziaur Rahman's reforms and policies have been characterised as pragmatic and effective, which helped Bangladesh recover from the devastation caused by the 1970 cyclone, the liberation war and the famine. He was termed a moderate leader who wanted to get Bangladesh out of extreme poverty. On the economic front, he transformed the socialist economy into a capitalist one, liberalized trade, and promoted entrepreneurship. These steps eventually were beneficial for the economy as the inflation fell and Bangladesh achieved much needed economic growth. Industries like the ready-made garments and leather got a foothold.

In politics, most of his measures were the acts of balance between different groups who have influence in Bangladeshi politics.

== See also ==
- Presidency of Hussain Muhammad Ershad – President of Bangladesh from 1983 to 1990
- Premiership of Sheikh Mujibur Rahman – Period of the Government of Bangladesh from 1972 to 1975
- Premiership of Sheikh Hasina – Period of the Government of Bangladesh from 1996 to 2001 and 2009 to 2024
- Premiership of Khaleda Zia – Period of the Government of Bangladesh from 1991 to 1996 and 2001 to 2006
