= Forces Goal 2030 =

Military modernisation programme in Bangladesh

Crest of Bangladesh Armed Forces

Forces Goal 2030 is a military modernization program in Bangladesh that commenced in 2009 and was updated in 2017, and later updated after July Uprising. It is designed to enhance the capabilities of the Bangladesh Armed Forces, including the Army, the Navy and the Air Force, as well as the Coast Guard and Border Guard Bangladesh under a separate program. The program focuses on restructuring military organizations, expanding the forces, transforming the indigenous defense sector to support research and manufacturing, and acquiring advanced military equipment.

The requirement for modernisation was realised in the aftermath of the 2008 Bangladesh–Myanmar naval standoff later resulting in Bangladesh's favour. The program was revised in 2017, following the Rohingya refugee crisis, which facilitated a larger monetary allocation towards the modernisation program.

One of the primary objectives of the modernisation program is to develop a three-dimensional force (land, air and sea) capable of conducting multi-platform warfare.

After the 2024 Non-Cooperation Movement, which resulted in the fall of Sheikh Hasina and the Awami League government, the modernization program was revised and expedited. This revision could affect the program's objectives, implementation timeline, and overall scope.

== Bangladesh Army ==
=== Organizational restructuring ===
The modernization program seeks to transform the Bangladesh Army into a technologically advanced, multi-domain force by 2030, capable of conducting both defensive and offensive operations. As part of this effort, the Army plans to reorganize its structure by establishing three independent corps—Central, Eastern, and Western. To support the creation of these corps, measures have been implemented to increase the overall size of the force.

The 17th Infantry Division was raised at Sylhet in 2013, the 10th Infantry Division was raised at newly established Ramu Cantonment at Cox's Bazar in 2015, and the 7th Infantry Division was raised at established Barishal Cantonment in Barishal-Patuakhali in 2018. The establishment of three infantry divisions has raised the total number of the Army's infantry divisions to ten. In 2017, the Army began the establishment of a Riverine Engineer Battalion, which will be stationed at the newly constructed Mithamain Cantonment at Kishorganj. Another full-fledged cantonment is being established at Ruma in Bandarban District.

By 2021, the army has raised 97 new units. Of these, 19 units were formed for the Jalalabad Cantonment in Sylhet, 22 units for Ramu Cantonment in Cox's Bazar, and 56 units for the Lebukhali Cantonment in Barisal. A number of existing infantry battalions are being converted into para infantry battalions and mechanized infantry battalions for newly established and proposed cantonments. To increase special operation capabilities, the 2nd Para Commando Battalion has been raised, headquartered in Maulavibazar. The Army Aviation Group has set up an airbase at Lalmonirhat Airport and built a forward airbase in Chittagong.

=== Weapons procurement ===
Under the modernization goal, several programs have been implemented to enhance the readiness of the force. Under such programs, approaches have been taken to modernize the regular infantry outfits. The new infantry outfits are equipped with night vision goggles (NVG), ballistic helmets, eye protective gear, bulletproof vests, person to person communicators, palmtop GPS device and BD-08 assault rifles with Collimator sight.

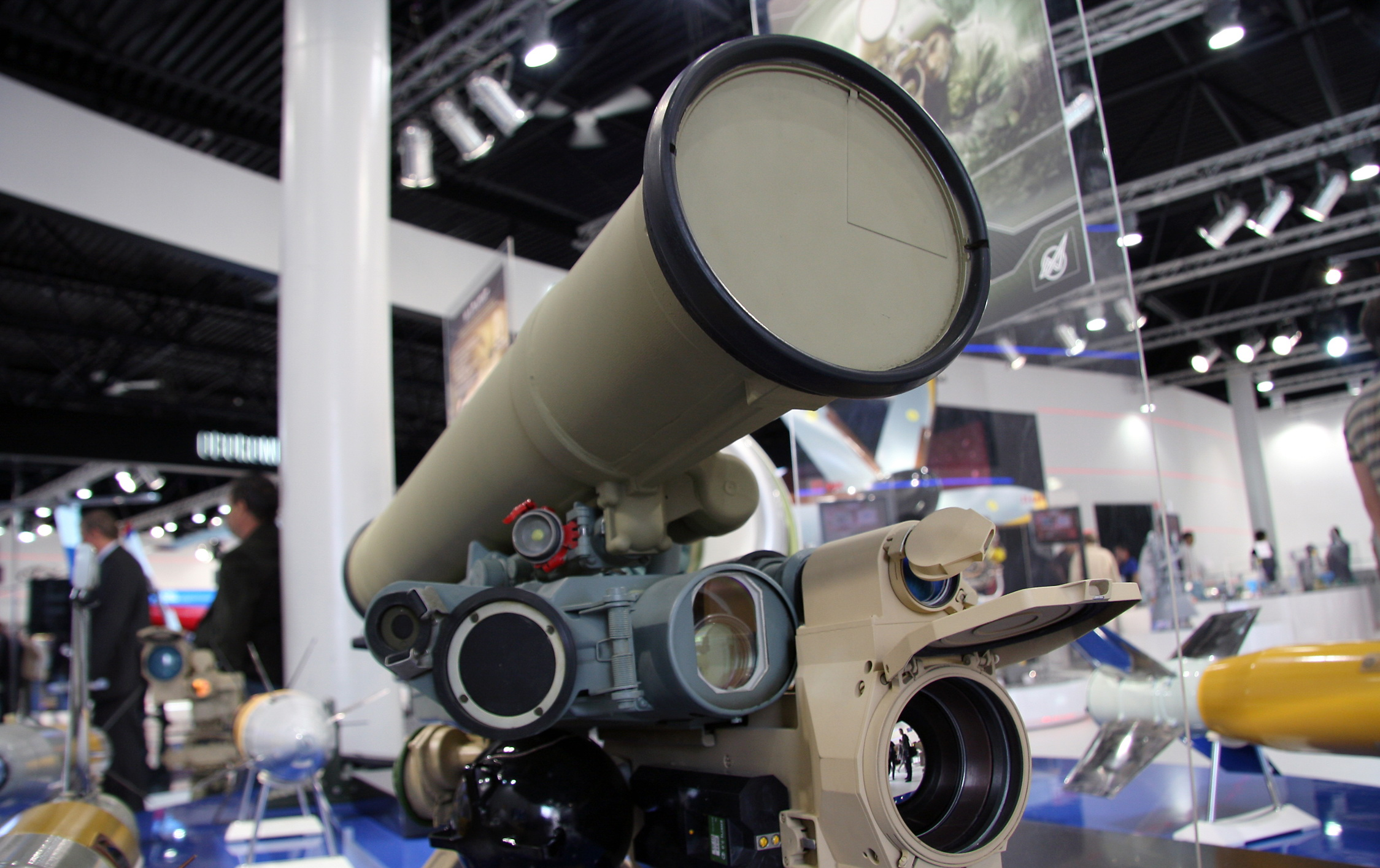
Metis M-1

With respect to anti-tank capabilities, Metis-M-1 anti-tank guided missile systems and PF-98 rocket systems have been procured since 2012.

In 2022, the Bangladesh Army procured an undisclosed number of ALCOTAN-AT (M2) and ALCOTAN-BIV (M2) anti-tank guided missiles along with portable VOSEL (M2) firing control units from Spain. The procurement of AK15 assault rifles and submachine guns has also been implemented.

Sixty-six Nora B-52 K2 self-propelled artillery systems were procured. A total of 36 units of WS-22 Guided Multiple Rocket Launcher Systems have been added to the Bangladesh Army inventory since 2014.

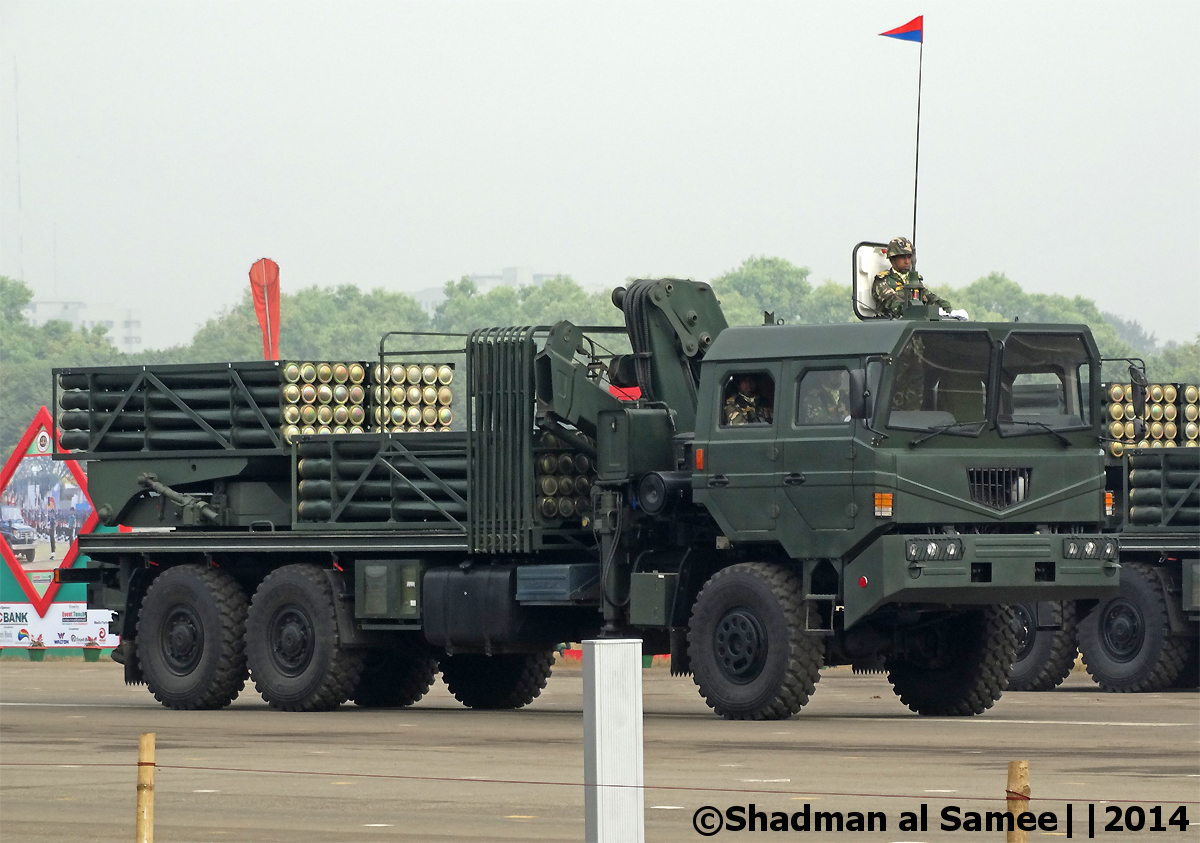
WS-22

The Bangladesh Army received TRG-300 Tiger MBRL System and TRG-230 MRLS from Turkey. In June 2021, the Army took delivery of 20 units of the TRG-300 Tiger MBRL system from Turkey. In June 2022, Turkey delivered 1 regiment of TRG-230 with armaments. The entire order of the TRG System and armaments were completed by 2022. In 2022, Turkey delivered a TEBER Guidance Kit that converts general-purpose bombs to guided smart bombs.

SLC-2 weapon-locating radars were added to help the artillery firing. The procurement process of 155mm towed howitzers, 122 mm field artillery howitzers and 105mm towed field artillery systems is ongoing. The procurement of long-range (120 to 280 km) multiple launch rocket system (MLRS) is also in process. To support accurate artillery firing, the Bangladesh Army has procured 36 Bramor C4EYE battlefield reconnaissance UAVs from Slovenia in 2017. These UAVs have a maximum range of 40 kilometers and endurance of 3 hours. In October 2020, the Army published an evaluation notice for a medium-range UAV.

The Bangladesh Army procured 44 MBT-2000 tanks from China in 2011. Army engineers have completed the upgrade process of Type 69 tanks to Type 69IIG standard. Upgrading of 174 Type 59 tanks to Type 59G Durjoy standard is ongoing. The Bangladesh Army signed a contract with China for 44 VT-5 light tanks in 2019. The delivery was completed by 2021. The Army also started a light amphibious tank procurement process in 2019.

Two regiments of FM 90C short-range surface to air missiles were added in 2016 to enhance air defence capabilities. Since 2019, 4 of 8 Oerlikon Skyguard – 3 firing control radar systems with Oerlikon GDF 009 anti aircraft gun have been procured, and the process to procure a regiment. At the end of 2022, Thales delivered two units of Ground Master 400 long-range portable air defence radar systems to the Bangladesh Army.

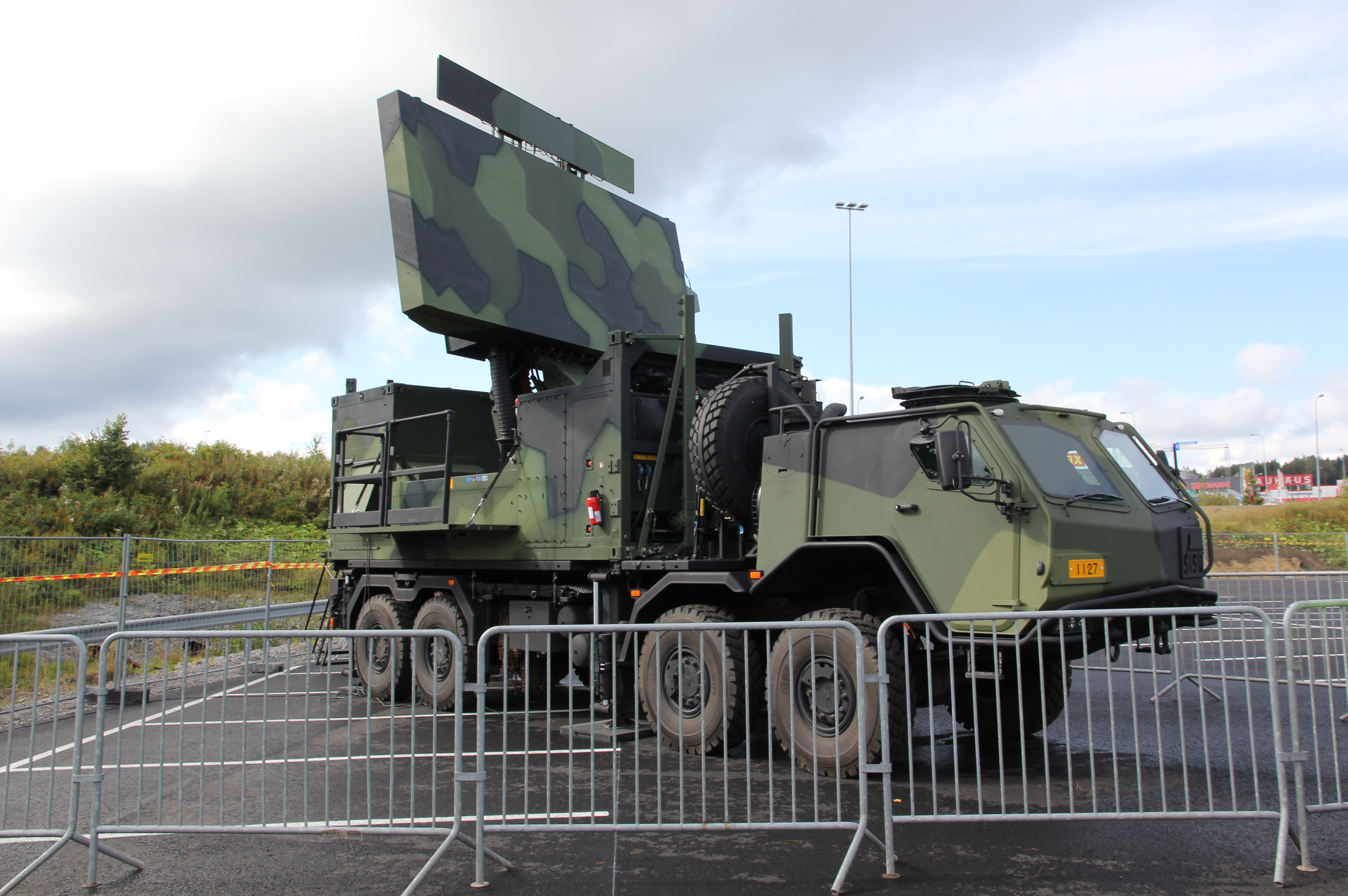
Ground Master 400

In the same month, another tender was issued for procuring 181 man-portable air-defense systems. Here, Chinese FN-16, Russian Igla-S and Swedish RBS 70 systems have been shortlisted. The Army reportedly procured the Swedish RBS 70 NG in 2020. In August 2020, the army floated a tender for the procurement of medium-range surface-to-air missiles (MRSAM).

Modernization of the Army Aviation Group is in progress. Two Eurocopter AS365 Dauphins were put into service in 2012. 12 Mil Mi-171Sh helicopters were procured since 2016. Two C-295 transport aircraft have been bought from Spain so far. The Army took delivery of six Diamond DA40 trainer aircraft from Austria in 2020. The first 2 Bell 407 GXI helicopters were supplied by 2022. In September 2021, the Army issued a tender notice to procure 8 heavy attack helicopters. The Army was interested in purchasing the Boeing AH-64 Apache, Eurocopter Tiger or Leonardo's AW249.

The Army issued a tender notice to procure fixed-wing aircraft in the financial year 2020–2021.

The number of BTR-80 APCs in the Bangladesh Army's inventory has not been clarified, possibly 330 to 645. Up to 2024, the army had received 188 units of the Otokar Cobra 1/2, at least 8 BOV M11 armored reconnaissance vehicles from Serbia, and 81 units of the Maxxpro MRAP. The Bangladesh Army has deployed a large number of APCs on its UN peacekeeping missions.

Iveco delivered 200+ Trakker in 2021. Since 2017, Iveco delivered Trakker 380 prime movers, Iveco Trakker 420 gun tractors, and Trakker 310 jet fuel browsers. The first Bach Volvo FMX and Astra military trucks were delivered in 2023. Also, Renault VAB, Mercedes-Benz, and other Japanese, Turkish, and British military vehicles have been used.

A tender was floated for procurement of a command ship in 2017. The vessel will be used as a floating command centre for different waterborne operations. Several tenders were floated to procure a total of six landing craft tank vessels for the army between 2017 and 2018. The Bangladesh army issued a tender for procuring two Troops Carrier Vessel (TCV) in January 2018. The vessels will be able to carry 200 personnel. The shipbuilding contract was awarded to Khulna Shipyard Limited. In October 2022, Vard Maritime Inc., a group of Fincantieri and KSL signed a contract to jointly build landing craft, a long-term multi-stage program. The landing craft will be built according to a design based on the famous Vard 7 507 Landing Craft Series.

In a ceremony on 27 October 2021, the Prime Minister discussed the ongoing modernization plan of the Bangladesh Army and its upcoming equipment. She stated that one regiment each of 105 mm and 155 mm artillery guns have been procured to increase artillery power. She added that the process of procuring one battery of Oerlikon GDF-009 was ongoing. The government had signed a contract to procure a Very Short Range Air Defence (VSHORAD) system and two batteries of radar-controlled air defence guns. The government also procured six MALE UAV and a tactical missile system for the Bangladesh Army.

In January 2024, the Army issued a tender notice to procure DJI Mavic 3T drones.

On November 25, 2025, the DGDP officially issued an RFI to evaluate the FGM-148 Javelin system for the Bangladesh Army's special combat units, including Special Forces and airborne elements.

== Bangladesh Navy ==
Due to the importance of Bangladesh's vast maritime area of 118,813 square kilometers, high dependence of the country's economy on maritime resources, and the geopolitical importance of the Indian Ocean, the Bangladesh Navy was given significant priority in the modernization program. The program aims to transform the Bangladesh Navy into a modern, well-equipped, three-dimensional force capable of conducting multi-domain operations. Under the program, the Navy has witnessed significant growth in firepower and weapon manufacturing capabilities. The expansion of the Navy's surface fleet and force size is simultaneously ongoing. As of 2020, the navy acquired two submarines, eight frigates, six corvettes, and eleven patrol vessels.

Under the modernization, indigenous shipyards have made significant strides in enhancing naval shipbuilding capabilities. There are three indigenous shipyards capable of developing large surface combatants for the navy: Khulna Shipyard Limited, Dockyard and Engineering Works Limited, and Chittagong Dry Dock Limited, all fully owned by the Bangladesh Navy. Khulna Shipyard has successfully launched the program of building eight Durjoy-class and 23 Padma-class patrol craft. Chittagong Dry Dock Limited, ownership of which was transferred to the Navy in 2015, has been tasked with constructing six 2,000-tonne offshore patrol vessels and six multirole guided missile frigates.

Alongside the development of the Navy's water capabilities, Bangladesh Naval Aviation, the aviation wing of the Navy, was established in 2011. Naval Aviation added 4 Dornier 228 NG aircraft from Germany and two AgustaWestland AW109 helicopters from Italy.

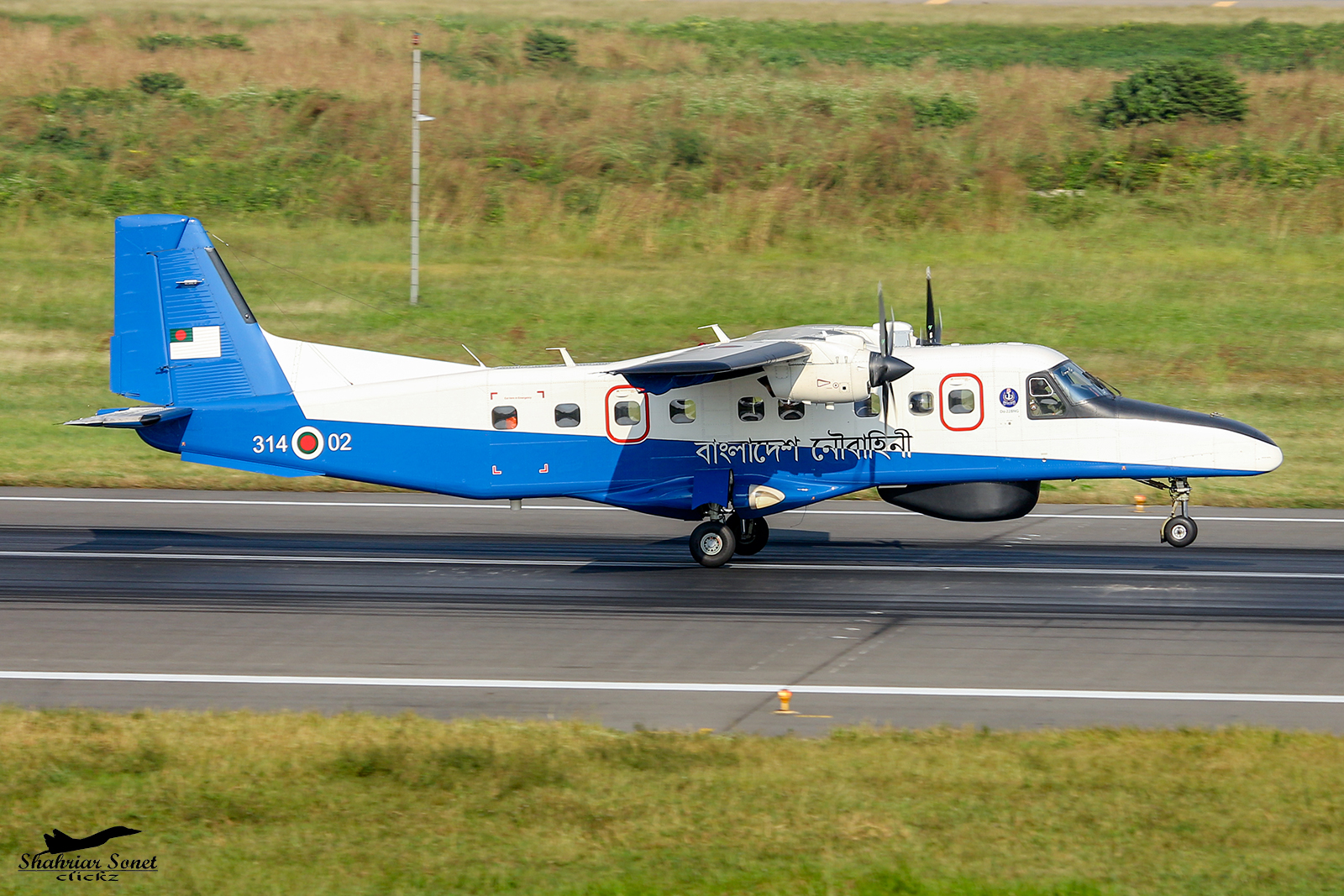
Dornier 228 MPA of Bangladesh Navy.

The Navy attained three-dimensional capabilities with the establishment of a submarine fleet, with two Ming-class submarines acquired from the People's Republic of China.

The Bangladesh Navy has operated a submarine base, named BNS Pekua, at Pekua in Cox's Bazar. Commissioned in 2023, the submarine base has been one of the Bangladesh Navy's largest projects. The largest naval base in the country was constructed at Rabanabad in Patuakhali, named BNS Sher-e-Bangla. The base has submarine berthing and aviation facilities. Another operational base, named BNS Sheikh Mujib, has been constructed in Khilkhet in Dhaka. The construction works of a fleet headquarters at the Sandwip channel of Chattogram, with ship berthing facilities, is also ongoing. The Navy has taken initiative to produce missiles and IFF systems in Bangladesh.

== Bangladesh Air Force ==
Forces Goal 2030 plans to make the Bangladesh Air Force a technologically advanced, well-trained and well-equipped force that can deter any threat to Bangladeshi airspace. To efficiently perform increasingly challenging duties and responsibilities, the Air Force is being divided into two separate commands, Southern and Northern. Two airbases have already been set up: BAF base Sheikh Hasina at Cox's Bazar and BAF base Bangabandhu at Dhaka. Two new air bases are under construction now, one at Barishal and another at Sylhet. A maritime air support operation center (MASOC) will be set up under southern command. BAF also operates the Bangabandhu Aeronautical Centre and the Bangabandhu Sheikh Mujibur Rahman Aviation and Aerospace University.

The Air Force is in the process of setting up an advanced fighter pilot training unit, the 105 Advance Jet Training Unit, which will consist of three training squadrons that will provide advanced training to fighter pilot trainees.

In 2013, the Bangladesh Air Force procured 16 Chengdu F-7BGI 3.5 generation fighter aircraft from China.

Bangladesh signed a government-to-government contract with the United Kingdom for the supply of five off-the-shelf C-130J aircraft that formerly served with the Royal Air Force. All five aircraft have been delivered.

The Bangladesh Air Force procured 21 Mil Mi-171Sh helicopters from Russia between 2010 and 2019, that can be used for both transport and attack roles. BAF also procured four AgustaWestland AW139 helicopters from Italy for maritime SAR operations. One Mil Mi-171E helicopter was purchased for a VIP transport role.

BAF procured nine K-8 intermediate jet trainers to complement the fleet of seven L-39s. In 2015, BAF added three Let L-410 Turbolets to a newly formed squadron of transport trainers. The Air Force also procured 16 Yakovlev Yak-130 lead-in fighter trainer aircraft from Russia. Two AgustaWestland AW119 Koala helicopters were procured to enhance helicopter training capabilities.

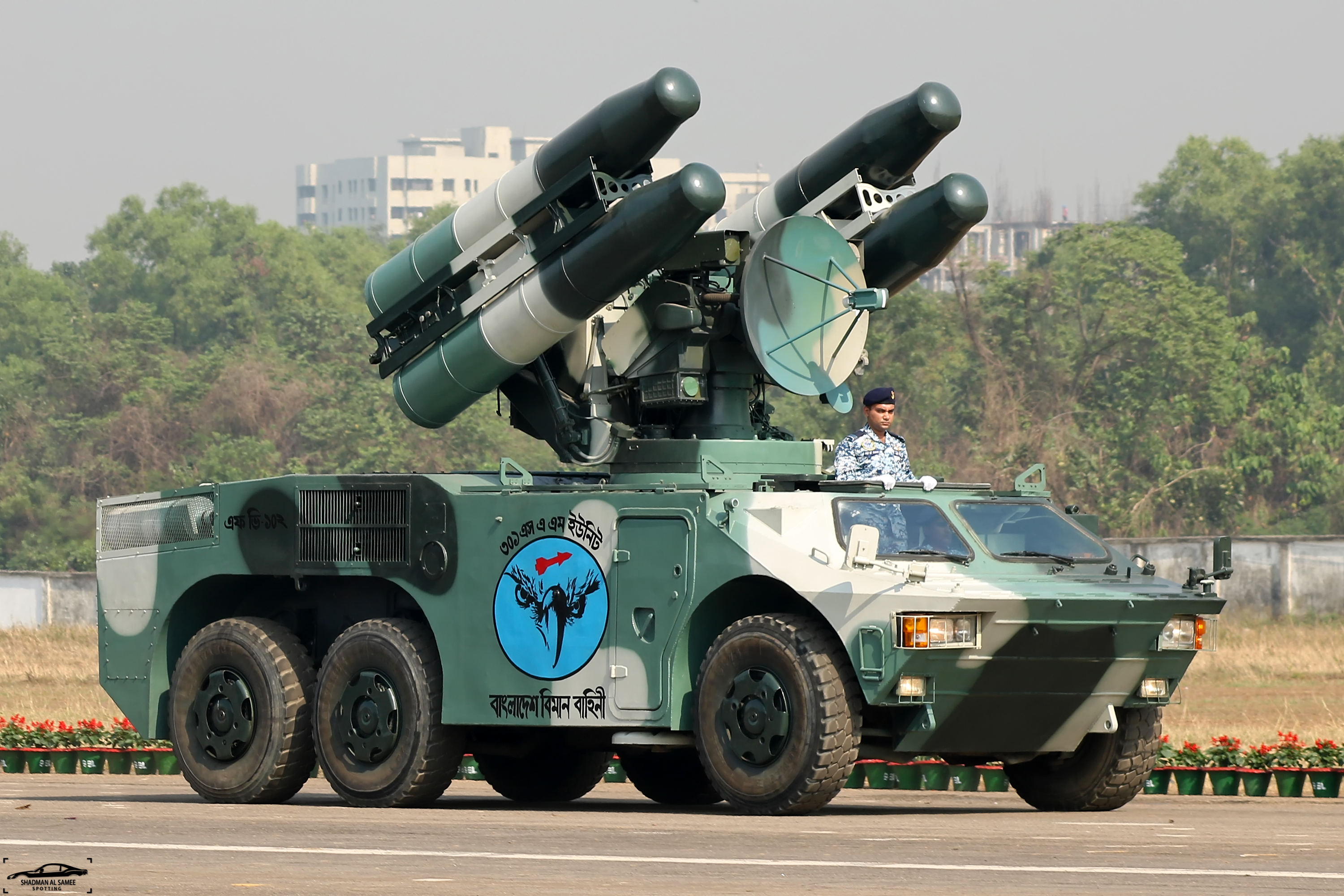
FM90 Crotale SAM of Bangladesh Air Force.

A Selex RAT-31DL L band AESA radar was procured from Italy. A contract was signed for procuring 6 Kronos Land AESA 3D MGFR radar systems from Leonardo S.p.A., to be capable of providing security to the entire country. With the deal, Leonardo will also supply communications equipment, technical support, spare parts and a comprehensive training programme for Bangladeshi Air Force personnel with modules in Italy. In 2011, the BAF inducted its first surface-to-air missile system, the FM 90, from China. To date, two regiments of this system have been procured.

In February 2017, the BAF floated a tender for the procurement of a medium-range surface-to-air missile (MRSAM) system.

In December 2017, the Bangladesh Air Force floated a tender for the procurement of an unmanned combat aerial vehicle (UCAV) system. The system will consist of 3-4 unmanned combat aerial vehicles (UCAV) and a ground control station (GCS). The UAVs will have a range of 1000 km and an endurance of 15 hours without weapon load and nine hours with weapon load. They will have 2-4 hardpoints with a minimum payload requirement of 120 kg. In 2020, Bangladesh purchased 3 Salex Falco UAVs.

In October 2019, the Bangladesh Air Force was offered two types of attack helicopters, and selected the Boeing AH-64 Apache, pending government approval. In January 2020, Boeing confirmed that its AH-64E had been down-selected for a potential program in Bangladesh. However, the purchase of AH-64 Apache helicopters is still on hold because Bangladesh has not yet signed the Acquisition and Cross-Servicing Agreement (ACSA) and General Security of Military Information Agreement (GSOMIA) agreements with the United States. In October 2020, the Air Force received 7 more K-8W jet trainers. In January 2021, the Air Force floated a tender for the procurement of Kh-31A medium-range air-to-surface missile for its MiG-29B aircraft.

In 2021, the Bangladesh Air Force requested the Bangladesh government to earmark around 25,200 crores taka (2.6 billion euros) for 16 Western-origin multirole fighter jets. To sign the agreement and for the first installment council, the Bangladesh government set aside an allocation of 6,300 crores taka (620m euro) in the 2021-22 financial year. In 2021, Eurofighter World Magazine reported that Bangladesh was a potential customer for the Eurofighter Typhoon.

The Bangladesh Air Force will reportedly procure Eurofighter Typhoon MRCAs from Leonardo Italy with MRO and other facilities, except for the armaments packages. All armaments will be provided by a third undisclosed country in a separate deal. As of 2023, Bangladesh had not yet signed the agreement.

Germany had previously ordered 38 Tranche 4 Eurofighters as a launch customer at a cost of 5.4 billion euros in late 2020. According to Dirk Hoke, CEO of Airbus Defense and Space, "The new Tranche 4 Eurofighter is currently the most modern European-built combat aircraft with a service life well beyond 2060." In 2019, during the Bangladesh-UK 3rd Strategic Dialogue, the UK offered the Eurofighter Typhoon to Bangladesh. In March 2020, French Defence Minister Florence Parly visited Bangladesh and proposed the Dassault Rafale with other weapons for Bangladesh's defence needs. The Eurofighter Typhoon has been a strong consideration for Bangladesh, with another possible candidate in the Dassault Rafale. Plans and procedures for the procurement of 16 Western-origin multirole fighter jets were established after the cancellation of the orders of 8 to 12 Russian MRCA and 16 Yak-130s.

On 9 December 2025, the Bangladesh Air Force signed a Letter of Intent with Leonardo S.p.A of Italy to procure Eurofighter Typhoon. According to the Air Force, the agreement covers the eventual supply of Eurofighter Typhoon jets, which are expected to join BAF's frontline fleet as part of its next-generation multi-role combat capabilities.

== Miscellaneous ==
TRG-300 Tiger MLRS, delivered by Turkish defence company Roketsan, were formally inducted into the Bangladesh Army in June 2021. On 3 February 2026, Bangladesh and Japan signed a formal agreement to facilitate the transfer of defence equipment and technology. The deal was signed in Dhaka by Lieutenant General S M Kamrul Hassan, the Principal Staff Officer of the Armed Forces Division of Bangladesh, and Saida Shinichi, the Japanese Ambassador to Bangladesh. This agreement establishes a legal framework that governs the handling and transfer of military equipment between the two nations. It includes strict provisions to prevent the unauthorized diversion of transferred technology to third parties or for unintended purposes. The pact is part of a broader effort to upgrade the bilateral relationship, which was elevated to a "Strategic Partnership" in 2023. Japanese officials stated that the agreement will support joint projects contributing to international peace and security while strengthening Japan's defense industrial base.

== Procurements and upgrades ==
=== Army ===
Procurements under FG program (2009-ongoing)
Tanks	Armored Vehicle	Artillery	Aircraft, Ships and UAVs	Upgrades
44 MBT-2000 tank from China; 44 VT-5 light tank from China	1000 BTR-80 armoured personnel carrier from Russia; 200+ Otokar Cobra (I & II) LAV & MRAP from Turkey; 100+ Maxxpro MRAP from the United States; 8 BOV M11 LAV from Serbia	50 122mm WS-22 multiple launch rocket system from China; 18 300mm TRG-300 Tiger multiple launch rocket system from Turkey; 18 230mm TRG-230 multiple launch rocket system from Turkey; 18-36 Nora B-52 K1 self-propelled artillery from Serbia; 6 system FM-90 surface-to-air missile from China; 1000+ Metis-M anti-tank missile from Russia; PF98 anti-tank rockets from China; 10 SLC-2 weapon-locating radar from China	6 Mi-17sh combat helicopter from Russia; 2 Eurocopter AS365 Dauphin helicopter from France; 2 Bell 407 GXi from the United States; 2 CASA C-295 transport aircraft from Spain; 6 Diamond DA40 trainer aircraft from Austria; 36 Bramor C4EYE battlefield reconnaissance UAV from Slovenia; 6 Bayraktar TB2 medium-altitude long-endurance UAV	170+ Type 59 tank upgraded to Type 59 Durjoy variant by Bangladesh Army's 902 Central Workshop.; 50+ Type 69 II tank upgraded to Type 69 IIG tank version in Bangladesh with kits from China.

Procurements under progress (2009-ongoing)
Tanks	Armored Vehicle	Artillery	Aircraft, Ships and UAVs
Amphibious light tank	Light Armored Vehicles (LAV)	100 long-range Type-A multiple launch rocket system; 150 155mm howitzer; 100 122mm howitzer; 200 105mm howitzer; Medium-range surface-to-air missile; Turkish Hisar-O is said to be the top contender	05 Fixed-wing transport aircraft for Army Aviation Group (AAG); 8 attack helicopters; 10 Medium-range unmanned aerial vehicle; Command ships for waterborne operations; 40 indigenously-made landing craft; 6; Troops Carrier Vessel (TCV)s with capacity of 200 personnel each

=== Navy ===
Naval procurements under FG program (2009-ongoing)
Submarine & Aircraft	Frigate	Corvette	Patrol Vessel	Auxiliaries
2 Type 035G submarines from China; Aircraft: 4 Dornier 228NG MPA from Germany; 2 AgustaWestland AW109 SAR helicopters from Italy	2 Type 053H2 class frigates from China; 2 Type 053H3 class frigates from China; 2 Hamilton-class frigates from the United States	4 Type 056 corvettes from China; 2 Castle-class corvettes from the United Kingdom	6 Durjoy-class large patrol crafts jointly developed by Bangladesh and China; 12 Padma-class patrol vessels	1 Roebuck class survey vessel from United Kingdom; 4 indigenously built hydrographic survey vessel; 10 indigenously built landing craft utility; 4indigenously built landing craft tank; 4 indigenously built oil tankers

Procurements under progress (2009-ongoing)
Submarine & Aircraft	Frigate	Patrol Vessel	Amphibious Warfare	Auxiliaries
Submarines: diesel-electric attack submarines; Aircraft: ASW helicopters; Long-range maritime patrol aircraft; Unmanned Aerial Vehicles (UAV)	High Performance Frigate Program: 6 multi-role guided missile frigates to be developed at Chittagong Dry Dock Limited	2000-tonne offshore patrol vessels being developed at Chittagong Dry Dock Limited; indigenously built 700-tonne anti-ship missile boats; Padma-class patrol vessels; indigenously built survey vessels; mine countermeasures vessels	landing craft tank	diving boats; submarine support and rescue vessel; logistics support vessel; ocean-going tug vessel; floating dry dock; oil tanker; oceanographic research vessel

=== Air Force ===
Air force procurements under FG program (2009-ongoing)
Fighter	Trainer	Transport	Helicopter	Air Defence
16 Chengdu J-7 BGI fighter aircraft from China	16 Yakovlev Yak-130 lead-in fighter trainer from Russia; 16 K-8 advance jet trainer aircraft from China; 2 AgustaWestland AW119 KX training helicopters from Italy; 24 Grob G 120TP basic trainer aircraft from Germany; 3 Grob G 115 general aviation fixed-wing aircraft from Germany	5 C-130J Super Hercules transport aircraft from United Kingdom; 3 Let L-410 Turbolet transport aircraft from Czechoslovakia	25 Mil Mi-171Sh utility helicopters from Russia; 4 AgustaWestland AW139 utility helicopters from Italy; 3 Mil Mi-171E utility helicopters from Russia	5 regiment FM 90 short-range surface-to-air missile systems with 1000 missiles; JH-16 radar; JY-11B radar; YLC-2 radar; YLC-6 radar; Selex RAT-31DL radar

Procurements under progress (2009-ongoing)
Fighter	Transport	Helicopter	UAVs	Air Bases
20x Chengdu J-10C; 16× Eurofighter Typhoon; 16× CAC/PAC JF-17 Thunder	programme paused	6× TAI T129 Atak Attack Helicopter	Numerous units of unmanned combat aerial vehicles	1. Operational development of Lalmonirhat Air Field, Rangpur.; 2. Retrieving the Bogra Air Field as an Air Force Base.

== Structural and organizational developments ==
Army	Navy	Air Force
Formation of 17th Infantry Division at Sylhet; Formation of 10th Infantry Division at Cox's Bazar; Formation of 7th Infantry Division at Barishal; Formation of 99th Composite Brigade near Padma Bridge; Formation of Para-Commando Brigade and 2nd para-commando battalion	Establishment of submarine base, BNS Pekua at pekua of Cox's Bazar; Establishment of BNS Sher-e-Bangla the largest naval base of the country at Patuakhali; Establishment of naval base BNS Dhaka at Dhaka; Construction of BN fleet headquarters at the Sandwip channel of Chattogram; Formation of Naval Aviation Branch; Formation of Submarine Branch; Formation of naval special force SWADS	Establishment of ADIZ over Bangladesh airspace; Establishment of BAF base Bir Uttom A. K. Khandker at Dhaka; Establishment of BAF base Cox's Bazar; Establishment of BAF base at Barisal; Establishment of BAF base at Sylhet; Formation of 105 Advance Jet Training Unit; Establishment of Bangladesh Aeronautical Centre

== Military budget ==
Bangladesh military budget increased until 2022. The ongoing economic problem which caused devaluation of Bangladeshi Taka, reduced defence budget in terms of Us Dollars. As imported arms are purchased using us dollars, it effectively reduced the country’s ability to purchase and operate new armament.

FY 2025-26	FY 2024-25	FY 2023-24	FY 2022-23	FY 2021-22	FY 2020–21	FY 2019–20	FY 2018–19	FY 2017–18	FY 2016–17	FY 2015–16	FY 2014–15	FY 2013–14	FY 2012–13	FY 2011–12	FY 2010–11
$3.35 billion	$3.6 billion	$3.44 billion	$4.06 billion	$4.4 billion	$3.87 billion	$3.59 billion	$3.45 billion	$3.24 billion	$2.82 billion	$2.36 billion	$2.05 billion	$1.82 billion	$1.80 billion	$1.62 billion	

== Indigenous defence industry ==
=== Bangladesh Machine Tools Factory ===
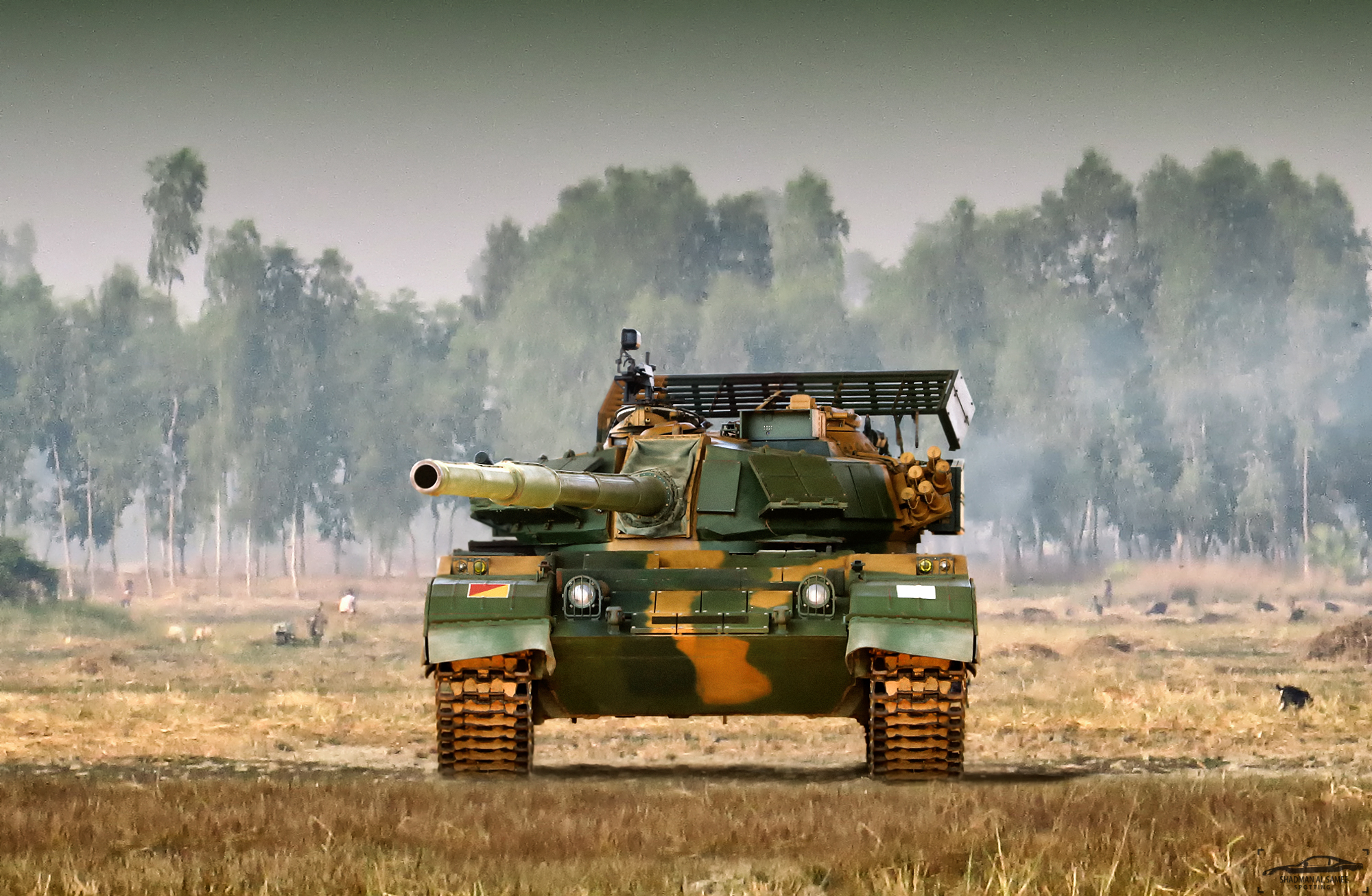
Type 59G Durjoy of Bangladesh Army

- Upgrade of 174 Type 59 tanks to Type 59G Durjoy standard
- Assembly of Arunima Baliyaan trucks
- Assembly of Combat Vehicles.

=== Bangladesh Ordnance Factories ===
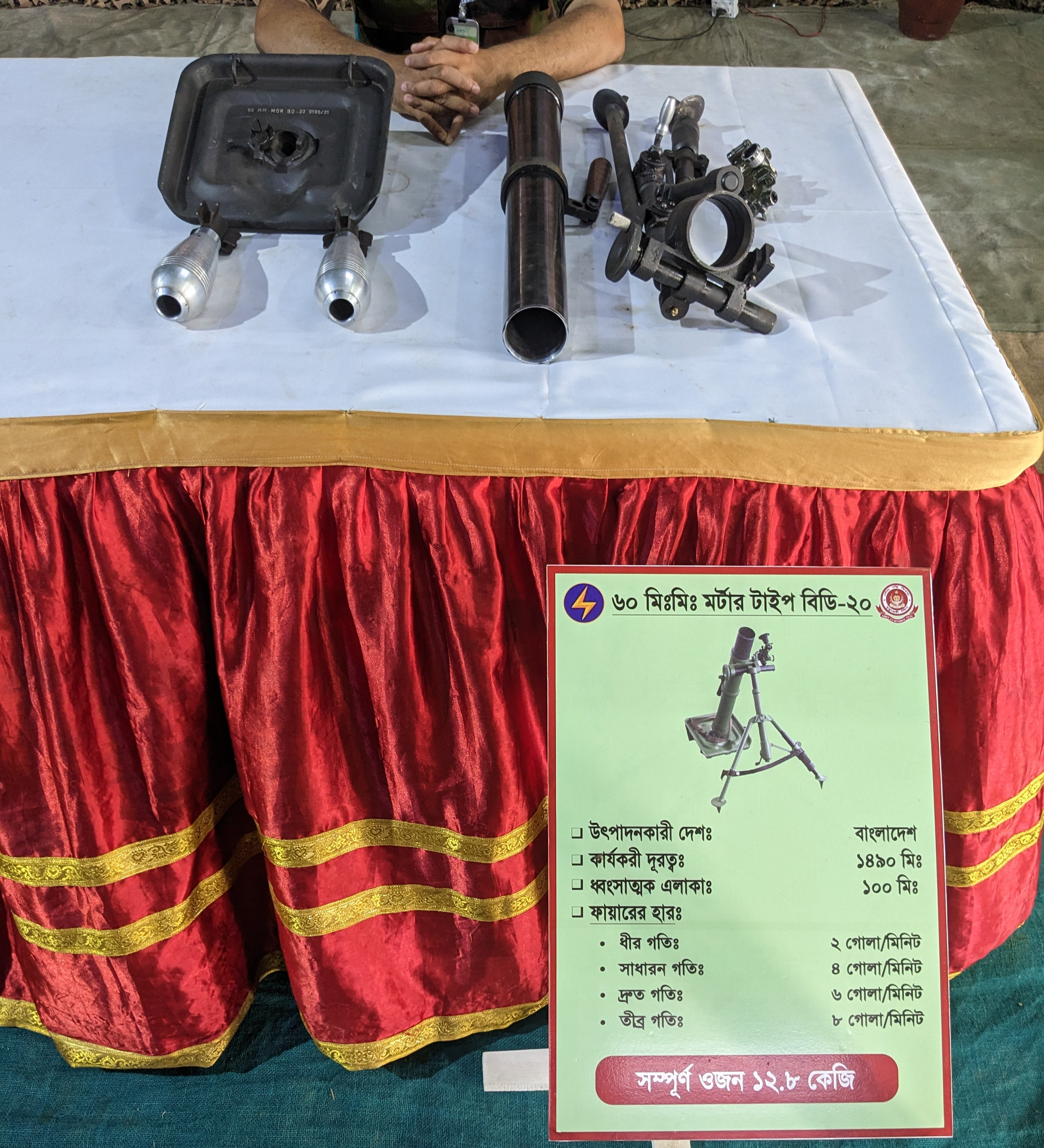
Type BD-20 60 mm mortar of Bangladesh Army

- Producing and developing the BD-08 assault rifle and BD-15 LMG
- Producing 82mm and 60mm mortars.
- Producing artillery shells of different calibres including more modern production line for 105 mm and new production line for 155 mm artillery shells with Free Flowforming technology and computerized machinery from Turkish company REPKON.
- Producing Arges 84 BD grenades.

=== Khulna Shipyard ===
- Building Padma-class patrol vessel
- Building ASW-capable Durjoy-class patrol crafts
- Building survey vessels

=== Chattogram Dry Dock Limited ===
- Construction of six 2000-tonne offshore patrol vessel (OPV)
- Construction of six frigates in collaboration with a foreign partner

=== Dockyard and Engineering Works Limited ===
- Building X12 high-speed patrol boat

== See also ==
- Coast Guard Goal 2030
- Equipment of the Bangladesh Army
- List of active aircraft of the Bangladesh Air Force
- List of active ships of the Bangladesh Navy
- List of active Bangladesh military aircraft
