= SQA eVTOL =

General information
- Type: VTOL UAV
- National origin: Slovenia
- Manufacturer: C-Astral
- Status: In production (2022)

History
- Introduction date: 2022 (announced)

The SQA eVTOL (otherwise known as Belin V) is a tactical reconnaissance UAV classified as a NATO class 1 mini tactical drone with less than 15kg MTOW. It was developed and built by C-Astral Aerospace Ltd from Ajdovscina in Slovenia. The development is based on the combat-proven and NATO-operated Bramor and Atlas family of legacy UAS .

== Description ==
The SQA eVTOL is a multi-role electric Vertical Take-Off and Landing (eVTOL) UAS with an advanced Blended Wing Body (BWB) airframe and 2 wing detachable booms for vertical lift thrust. The high-end composite materials used for the airframe construction provides a high degree of ruggedness and a low detection radar signature.

Defined as a multi-role UAS platform by C-Astral Aerospace, the SQA eVTOL is equipped with an EO/IR/LI gyro-stabilized micro-gimbal with optical and infrared sensor, laser pointer and with optional secondary sensor or other electronic equipments for additional mission purposes in the airframe bay.

The SQA eVTOL is also equipped with the latest generation DYN Micro Datalink radio control with live audio / 4K video transmission carried over a broadband MANET mesh network with AES encryption. The simultaneous transmission of metadata allows the integration of tactical data into situational awareness software and BMS suites (i.e. proprietary battle management system or Android Team Awareness Kit). The latest generation of autopilot with hardened GPS navigation system is integrated for navigation, in GPS denied environment.

It can be operated by 1 or 2 operators for a complete spectrum intelligence missions:

- Intelligence, Surveillance and Reconnaissance (ISR)
- Target acquisition ISTAR
- Close air support (CAS)
- JTAC (Joint Terminal Attack Controller)
- Tactical Signals Intelligence SIGINT (optional payload)

Its main customer market segment is worldwide Special Forces and sovereign military entities, i.e. missions for special operations, convoy tracking, target detection, search and rescue, first aid missions, civil defense, wildfire containment and mitigation, infrastructure control or security missions.

The SQA eVTOL has a basic combat radius of 42 km (extendable) and an endurance of 2.5 hours with daytime and nighttime flight capability. It can be equipped with IR optional beacons compatible with AN/PVS-7B/D, AN/PVS-14 and AN/AVS-9 night vision devices.

== Specifications ==
Data from manufacturer.

General characteristics

- Crew: none
- Length: 1.20 m (3 ft 11 in)
- Wingspan: 2.90 m (9 ft 6 in)
- Max takeoff weight: 10 kg (22 lb)
- Powerplant: 1 × Brushless Electric with push propeller
- Powerplant: 4 × Brushless Electric for VTOL lift thrust
- Propellers: 2-bladed

Performance

- Maximum speed: 108 km/h (67 mph, 58 kn)
- Cruise speed: 61 km/h (38 mph, 33 kn)
- Combat range: 42 km (26 mi, 23 nmi)
- Endurance: 2.5
- Service ceiling: 4,000 m (13,000 ft)

Armament
No armament

== Operators ==
- Slovenia

== See also ==
- Bramor C4EYE
- Atlas C4EYE
