= Bangladesh Army Aviation Group =

Army Aviation arm of the Bangladesh Army

Army Aviation Group
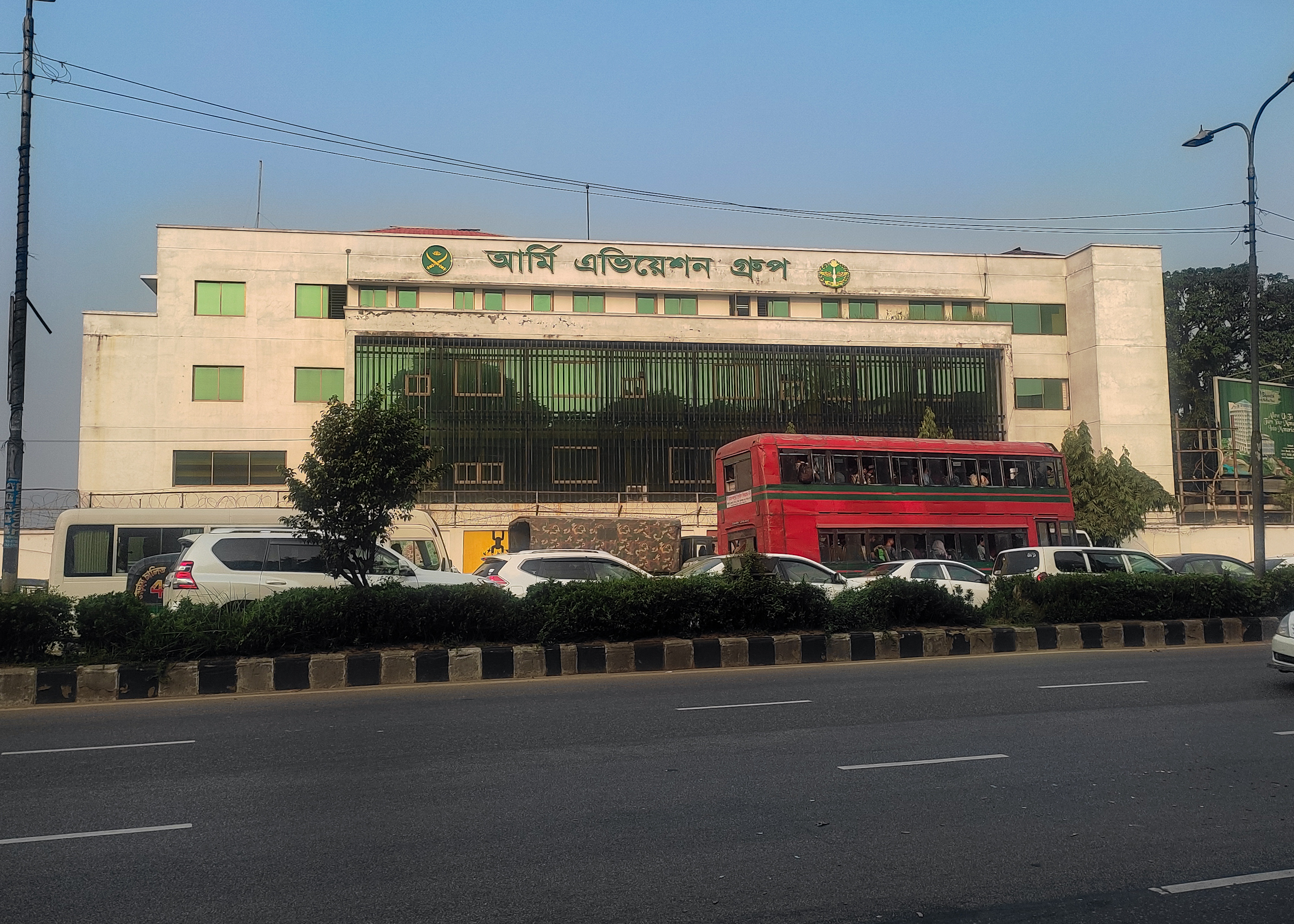
- Founded: 1 January 1978
- Country: Bangladesh
- Branch: Bangladesh Army
- Type: Army aviation
- Role: Aerial support, transport, ISR, ISTAR
- Headquarters: Tejgaon Airport, Dhaka, Bangladesh
- Mottos: BN: গতি ও নিপুনতা EN: Speed and Accuracy
- Engagements: Chittagong Hill Tracts conflict
- Decorations: See Medals of the Bangladesh Armed Forces

Commanders
- Group Commander: Major General AKM Arif

Insignia
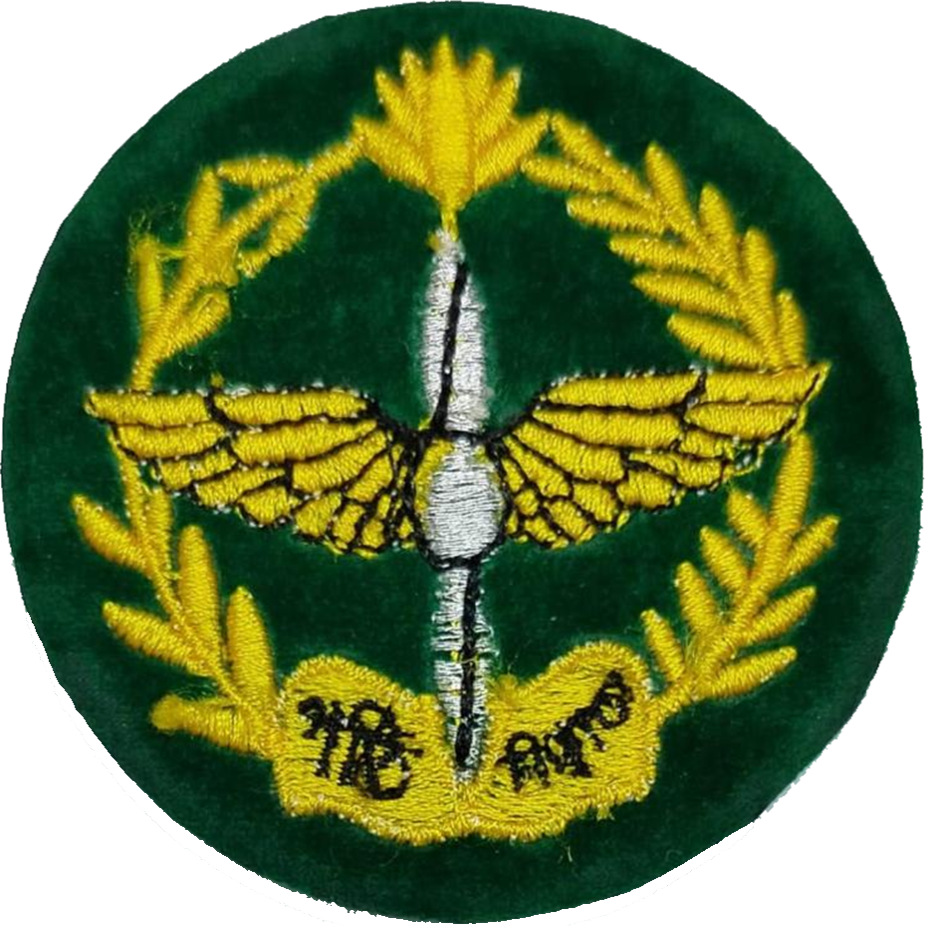
- Roundel

- Fin flash

Aircraft flown
- Trainer helicopter: Bell 206, Bell 407GXi, Bell 407
- Utility helicopter: Eurocopter AS365 Dauphin, Mi-171Sh
- Trainer: Diamond DA40 NG
- Transport: C-295W

The Army Aviation Group is the army aviation unit of the Bangladesh Army. The AAG conducts military air operations and is responsible for doctrine, manning and configuration for all aviation resources in the Army.

== History ==
=== Origin ===
The unit started its journey on 1 January 1978 as Army Aviation Flight. At that time, the army had no pilot training facilities of its own. Civil Aviation Authority, Bangladesh took up the responsibility of pilot training. Initially, the unit had no aircraft. The first aircraft in the army aviation unit were two Bell 205 helicopters gifted by the Iranian government in 1978. On 7 September 1979, the unit was upgraded to Army Aviation Squadron. On 15 July 1980, the unit got regiment strength and was named Army Air Regiment. In 1982, four Cessna 152 were procured for the regiment. These were the first fixed-wing aircraft of the army aviation. In 1983, one Piper PA-31T Cheyenne aircraft was procured which was used for VIP transport purposes. On 27 November 1995, the unit was named Army Aviation. Three Bell 206 L4 helicopters and one Cessna 208 Caravan were procured later to strengthen the Aviation Group. On 20 March 2012, the unit was finally named Army Aviation Group.

=== Present ===
The personnel strength of the unit is more than 204 with 30+ pilots. Members from all corps of Bangladesh Army can join this unit with proper qualification and training. The unit is headquartered at the Tejgaon Airport, Dhaka. After the formulation of Forces Goal 2030, the modernization and expansion of army aviation is going on in accordance with this goal. Following the goal, modern aircraft like 2 Eurocopter AS365 Dauphin helicopters, 2 C-295W transport aircraft and 12 Mi-171Sh combat and transport helicopters have been added to this unit. Recently six Diamond DA40 aircraft have been procured to slowly phase out the old Cessna 152s and increase training facilities. Four of these aircraft have been already added to the fleet while the rest two will join soon.

A new base for AAG was set up at Lalmonirhat Airport on 2 March 2020. This base will have the dedicated infrastructure for the Army Aviation Training School.

== Army aviation maintenance workshop ==
This unit is responsible for the maintenance of the aircraft of the army aviation group. Previously, personnel from Bangladesh Air Force did all the maintenance tasks of army aviation. Later on, the army came up with its own maintenance unit with its own personnel.

== Aircraft ==
=== Current inventory ===
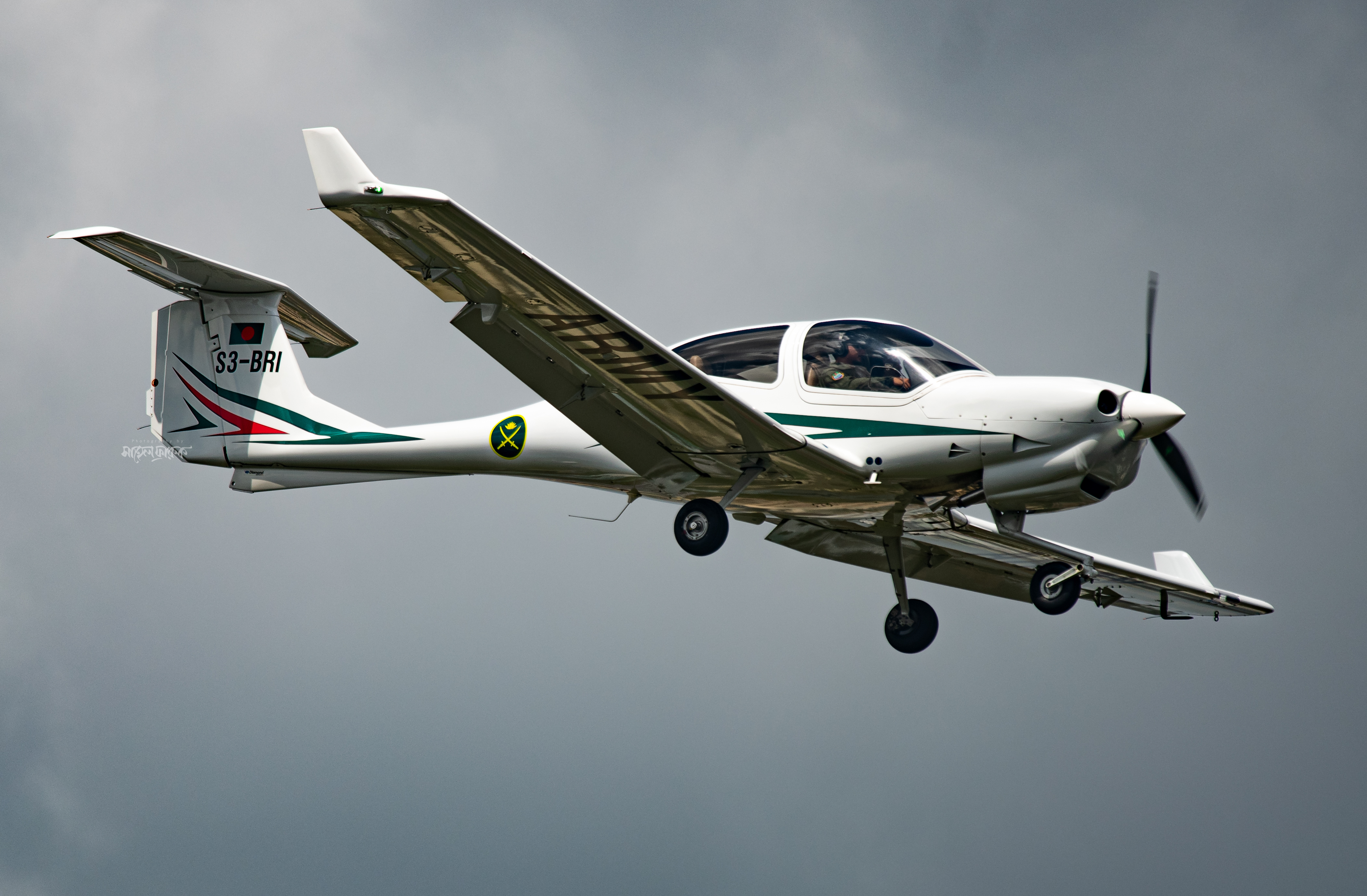
Bangladesh Army Aviation Group Diamond DA-40NG basic flight trainer

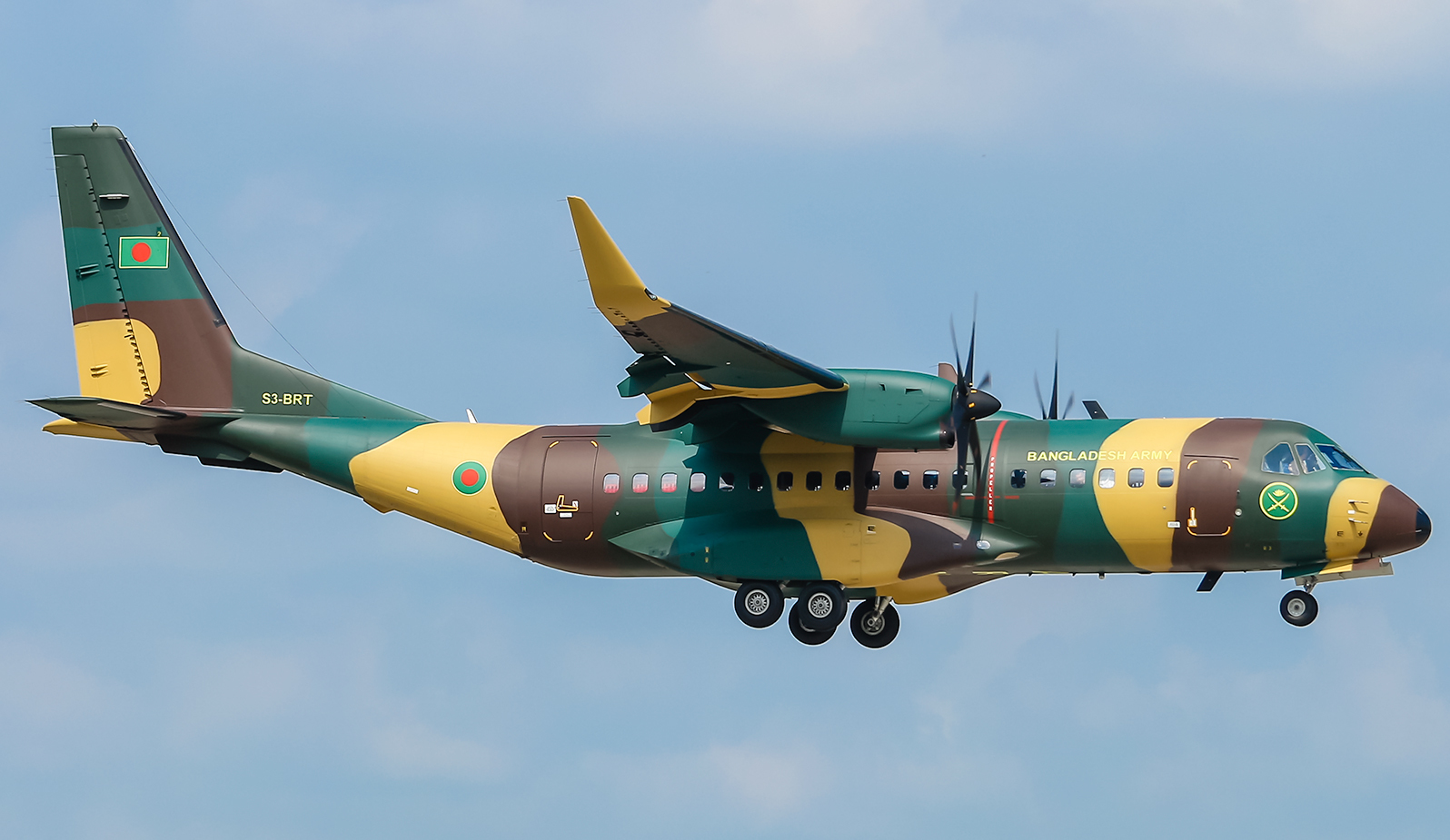
An Army CN-295W

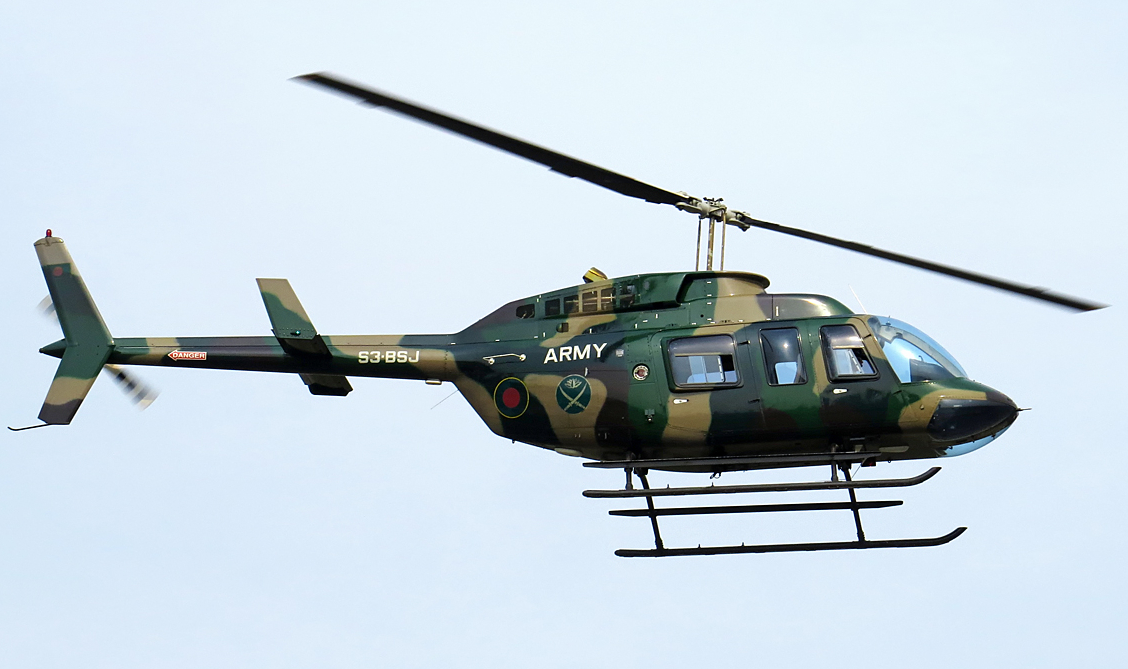
Bangladesh Army Aviation Bell 206-L4 LongRanger

Aircraft	Origin	Type	Variant	In service	Notes
Fixed wing
Cessna 152 Aerobat	United States	Light aircraft	A152	5	Fully retired and no longer flying
Cessna 208	United States	transport / utility		1	Retired at 2021 and will be replaced by Beechcraft King Air 360ER
CASA C-295	Spain	transport		2	
Diamond DA40	Austria	training		4	
Helicopters
Bell 206	United States	training	206L	1	
Bell 407	United States	training	407GXi	7	
Mil Mi-17	Russia	transport	Mi-171Sh	6	
Eurocopter AS365	France	utility		2	
Unmanned aerial vehicle
Baykar Bayraktar TB2	Turkey	Unmanned combat aerial vehicle		6	6 on order
Bramor C4EYE	Slovenia	Small unmanned surveillance and reconnaissance aerial vehicle	C4EYE	36	
RQ-12B Wasp AE	United States	Miniature UAV	RQ-12B		on order

== Future modernization plans ==
Bangladesh government has adopted a total restructuring plan for the Army Aviation Group. As per the plan, the Army Aviation Group will be renamed as the Army aviation. The total manpower of the unit will be raised from 204 to 704 personnel. By 2021, the number of aircraft operated by army aviation will be twenty-six. The army aviation maintenance workshop with 147 personnel will be re-structured to army aviation engineering workshop with 490 personnel. An aviation directorate will also be formed in the army.

They also have a plan to add fixed wing aircraft, transport aircraft, attack helicopters to the fleet in the process as well, while The Bangladesh Army is set to acquire four UH-60L Black Hawk helicopters as part of its military modernization efforts. This acquisition is part of the "Forces Goal 2030" modernization plan, which aims to enhance the nation's defense infrastructure and operational capabilities. The UH-60L Black Hawk is a multi-mission helicopter known for its robustness and versatility, making it a strategic choice for the Bangladesh Army's future aviation needs. The procurement process involves sealed bids from local and foreign manufacturers, with the tender opening date set for January 2026.

== See also ==
- Bangladesh Air Force
- Bangladesh Naval Aviation
