= Fakhrul Islam (disambiguation) =

Fakhrul Islam is a Pakistani Politician. It may also refer to:

- A. S. M. Fakhrul Islam, Bangladeshi officer
- A. F. M. Fakhrul Islam Munshi, Bangladeshi politician
- Fakhrul Islam Khan, Bangladeshi editor
- Mirza Fakhrul Islam Alamgir, Bangladeshi politician
