= Bangladesh Navy frigate program =

Class of guided-missile frigates for the Bangladesh Navy currently under development

Class overview
- Name: To be determined
- Builders: Chittagong Dry Dock Limited
- Operators: Bangladesh Navy
- Planned: 6

General characteristics
- Type: Frigate
- Displacement: 4,000 tons
- Sensors & processing systems: Radars; Sonar
- Electronic warfare & decoys: Electronic countermeasure (ECM); Electronic warfare support measures (ESM); Decoy
- Armament: Naval artillery; Anti-ship missiles; Surface to air missiles; ASW torpedoes
- Aviation facilities: Flight deck; enclosed helicopter hangar

The Bangladesh Navy Frigate Program is a planned project to build 6 multi-role stealth guided missile frigates for the Bangladesh Navy. In 2017, a plan for the frigate project under the Forces Goal 2030 plan was officially announced. The Bangladesh Navy is inspecting proposals from several companies to evolve their designs into a prospective design for the six proposed frigates.

== Development ==
Chittagong Dry Dock Limited (CDDL) was selected as the prime contractor for the Bangladesh Navy's frigate program, however, no further progress has been made. The frigates were supposed to be equipped with state-of-the-art military hardware, sensors, and electronic warfare systems. The lifespan of each frigate was estimated to be 30 years on average. The project has been delayed due to financial, geo-political and recent changes in foreign policies. At the beginning of the project, it was estimated that all of the frigates would be built with Chinese technical assistance and complete transfer of technology but the program was revised in 2017, following the Rohingya refugee crisis. In 2018, Commodore Mohammad Nazmul Karim said that two frigates would be commissioned in 2022, two by 2025 and two by 2030. However, the Bangladesh Navy added significant new requirements to the project mainly to adhere to NATO standards. As a result, many renowned European shipbuilding companies have shown interest. The project has become a major priority of the Ministry of Defence and the Prime Minister's Office. Due to the COVID-19 pandemic and the current Russian invasion of Ukraine, any frigate built under this project cannot be inducted into the navy before 2036 at the earliest. At the moment, the implementation of the program seems uncertain.

== Current progress ==
Although for now the program is officially active, albeit without any actual funding or budget, there has been no actual progress. The project was initiated by the then CNS Admiral Nizam with a motive to personal financial benefits. He appointed a new MD without any technical knowledge or background to realise his ill motive. Similarly, as in previous years there has been no mention of the frigate program nor any funds allocated for the program in the 2024-2025 annual budget.
