= Coast Guard Goal 2030 =

Bangladesh Coast Guard modernization plan

Emblem of the Bangladesh Coast Guard.

Coast Guard Goal 2030 is a planned modernization program for the Bangladesh Coast Guard. The goal includes increasing manpower, purchasing more ships, hovercraft, helicopters, UAVs, maritime patrol aircraft and adding new generation surveillance technologies. The vision of the goal is for the Bangladesh Coast Guard to be a technologically advanced two-dimensional force that is capable of effectively protecting the coastal area of Bangladesh. Additionally, it will assist the Bangladesh Navy in case of any national emergency.

== Plans and developments ==
The total development plans under the Coast Guard Goal 2030 have been divided into three phases: short term from 2015 to 2020, medium term from 2021 to 2025 and long term from 2026 to 2030.

=== Short term (2015–2020) ===
As per the short-term plan, the manpower of the force will be increased from 3,305 to 6,197. The organization of the force will be updated. Currently coast guard runs under three zonal headquarters. The coast guard will have three branches, six directorates, three regional headquarters and two more zonal headquarters within 2020. Four composite stations and one hospital will also be set up within this period.

The coast guard has purchased four Minerva-class corvettes from Italy which were later refurbished and transformed into offshore patrol vessels which are currently known as Leader-class offshore patrol vessel. The original sensors and armaments were removed from the ship and replaced by Bangladesh Coast Guard requirements. They are currently armed with one Oerlikon KBA 25mm gun. Already two vessels are in service and the remaining two were delivered in December 2017. A contract was signed with Khulna Shipyard for three Padma class Inshore Patrol Vessels in 2016. Separate contracts has been signed with Dockyard and Engineering Works Limited for the construction of two Shobuj Bangla class Inshore Patrol Vessels two 52 m Inshore Patrol Vessels and two 43 m Fast Patrol Boats. Within 2020, the force plans to buy four more Offshore Patrol Vessels and two Pollution Control Vessels. The number of small patrol crafts will be increased to 38 within this period.

Bangladesh Coast Guard is also planning to introduce hovercraft into its service for better patrolling capacity through the coast. At least two hovercraft will join the force by 2020.

The coast guard will start its journey as a two dimensional force by inaugurating its aviation wing in this period. 2-4 maritime search and rescue (MSAR) helicopters will be procured for the force within 2020. Surveillance Unmanned aerial vehicle (UAV)s may be introduced also in this period.

Coast guard will start its journey towards modern surveillance technologies within 2020. The installation of Long-range identification and tracking (LRIT) and Vessel Traffic Management Information System (VTMIS) systems will be started within this period.

=== Medium term (2021–2025) ===
In this period one technical training base and one aviation training base will be set up for the coast guard. The aviation wing of the force will be enriched. Manpower of the force will be increased.

As per the plan, the force will get two more Pollution Control Vessels three Riverine Patrol Vessel, two water jet scooters and 30 high speed patrol crafts in the medium term.

To enrich the aviation capacity, six more helicopters will be procured to make the total number of helicopters ten. Within the same period, six UAVs will be procured also.

As the plan goes, the process of installing Long-range identification and tracking (LRIT) and Vessel Traffic Management Information System (VTMIS) systems will be completed by 2025.

=== Long term (2026–2030) ===
The development of the Bangladesh Coast Guard will continue to thrive in this period. The manpower of the force will be increased further. More ships and UAVs will be added. This period will see the introduction of the maritime patrol aircraft to the coast guard.

== Procurement list ==
- 4 x Leader-class offshore patrol vessels
- 3 x Padma-class Inshore Patrol Vessels
- 2 x Shobuj Bangla class Inshore Patrol Vessels
- 2 x 52 m Inshore Patrol Vessels
- 2 x 43 m Fast Patrol Boats

== See also ==
- Forces Goal 2030
- List of ships of the Bangladesh Coast Guard
