= M Mustafizur Rahman =

Vice-Chancellor of AAUB and Bangladesh Air Force officer

- Born: 15 November 1970 (age 55)
- Military career
- Allegiance: Bangladesh
- Branch: Bangladesh Air Force
- Service years: 1991–present
- Rank: Air Vice Marshal
- Unit: GD(P)
- Commands: Aviation and Aerospace University, Bangladesh (Vice-Chancellor)
- Awards: Bishisto Sheba Padak (BSP); Gouraboujjal Uddoyon Padak (GUP)

Air Vice Marshal M Mustafizur Rahman, BSP, GUP, nswc, afwc, psc, GD(P) is a senior Bangladesh Air Force officer and the current vice-chancellor of Aviation and Aerospace University, Bangladesh (AAUB). He assumed office on 21 January 2026.

== Education ==
Rahman has an extensive academic background in aeronautics and defense studies:

- BSc in Aeronautics from Rajshahi University.
- Master of Defence Studies from the National University, Bangladesh.
- MSc from the University of Madras and the National Defence College.
- MPhil from the Bangladesh University of Professionals (BUP).

== Career ==
A long-time aviator, Rahman has over 30 years of experience in aviation planning, flight safety, and military operations. During his career in the Bangladesh Air Force, he served in several high-level staff appointments, including air secretary, director (planning), and director (flight safety) at Air Headquarters. He also served as the director general (Training) at the Armed Forces Division.

In the field of military education, he served as directing staff at the Defence Services Command and Staff College (DSCSC) and the Armed Forces War Course (AFWC). Prior to his appointment as vice-chancellor, he was the senior directing staff at the National Defence College, Bangladesh.

== Vice-chancellorship ==
Following his appointment on 21 January 2026, Rahman emphasized his commitment to establishing AAUB as a global center of excellence in aviation and space research.

== Awards and decorations ==
- Bishisto Sheba Padak (BSP)
- Gouraboujjal Uddoyon Padak (GUP)
