= Muhammad Nazrul Islam (air officer) =

- Born: 3 November 1964 (age 61)
- Military career
- Allegiance: Bangladesh
- Branch: Bangladesh Air Force
- Service years: 1986 - 2023
- Rank: Air Vice Marshal
- Unit: No. 12 Squadron
- Commands: Vice Chancellor of BSMRAAU; AOC of BAF Base Bashar; AOC of BAF Base Matiur Rahman; Commandant of Bangladesh Air Force Academy
- Conflicts: MONUSCO
- Awards: Bishishta Seba Padak (BSP)

Muhammad Nazrul Islam BSP, nswc, afwc, psc, GD (P) BSP, nswc, afwc, psc, GD(P), (Retd) is a retired Bangladesh Air Force officer. During his four decades in the military, he led a Bangladesh peacekeeping contingent in the Democratic Republic of Congo, commanded two air bases in Bangladesh, and was vice-chancellor of Bangabandhu Sheikh Mujibur Rahman Aviation and Aerospace University (BSMRAAU).

== Biography ==
Islam was commissioned in the general duties (pilot) branch of the Bangladesh Air Force (BAF) in 1986. He completed master's degrees in military disciplines from four institutions: National University, Bangladesh; University of Madras; National Defence University, Pakistan; and Bangladesh University of Professionals.

He served a stint as commander of the Bangladesh Air Force contingent in the United Nations Organization Stabilization Mission in the Democratic Republic of the Congo (MONUSCO). In 2019, he commanded BAF Base Birsreshto Matiur Rahman in Jessore. He later commanded BAF Base Bashar in Dhaka. During the COVID-19 pandemic, while educational institutions were closed, he temporarily converted BAF Shaheen College Kurmitola into an isolation and treatment center.

In July 2021, he was appointed vice-chancellor of Bangabandhu Sheikh Mujibur Rahman Aviation and Aerospace University (BSMRAAU) for a two-year term. During his time as VC, BSMRAAU transitioned to its permanent campus in Lalmonirhat.

After retiring from the BAF, he became managing director of BDCOM Online Ltd., an internet service provider.
