= Bangladesh Naval Aviation =

- বাংলাদেশ নেভাল এভিয়েশন
- Emblem of Bangladesh Navy
- Active: 14 July 2011 – present
- Country: Bangladesh
- Branch: Bangladesh Navy
- Type: Naval Aviation
- Headquarters: Naval Headquarter (NHQ), Banani, Dhaka
- Motto: "Eyes Over Horizon"

Commanders
- Commodore Naval Aviation (COMNAV): Commodore Mohammad Waseem Maqsood

Insignia
- Roundel

- Fin flash

Aircraft flown
- Helicopter: AgustaWestland AW109
- Patrol: Dornier 228 NG

Bangladesh Naval Aviation (Bengali: বাংলাদেশ নেভাল এভিয়েশন, romanized: Bangladesh Nebhala Ebhiẏesana) is the aviation wing of the Bangladesh Navy. The unit started its journey on 14 July 2011, making the Bangladesh Navy a two-dimensional force.

== History ==
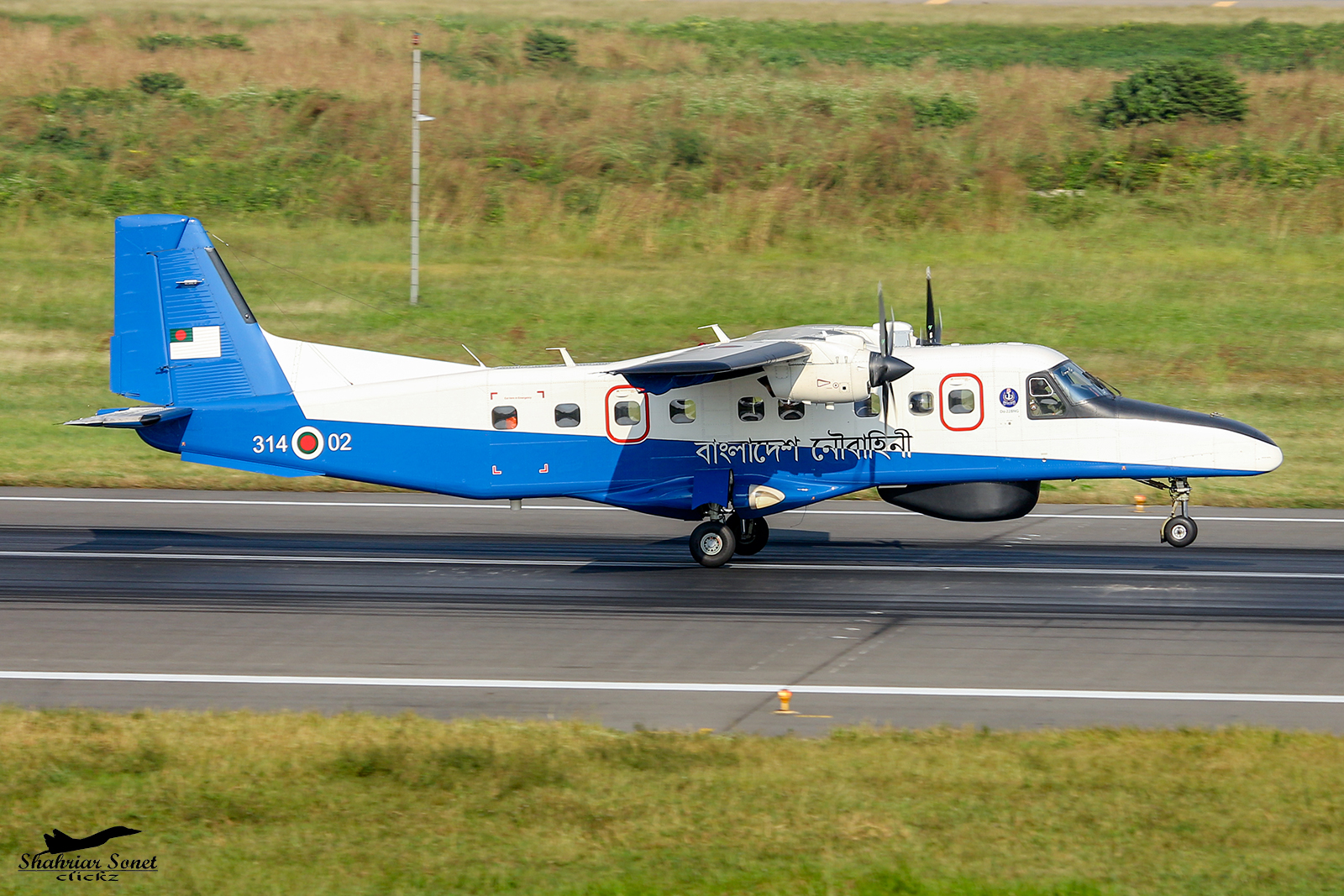
Dornier 228 MPA of Bangladesh Navy

The Bangladesh Navy started its journey during the Bangladesh War of Independence in 1971. At that time, the navy was a force equipped with surface ships only. In the 21st century, the Bangladesh Navy started to consider the necessity of being a three-dimensional force equipped with submarines and aircraft. It was in 2009 that the first two aircraft were ordered for the navy. The aircraft were two AgustaWestland AW109 search and rescue helicopters. The naval aviation formally started its journey on 14 July 2011 with the induction of the helicopters. Two Dornier 228NG maritime patrol aircraft joined the service in 2013 to mark the beginning of fixed-wing aircraft fleet. After the formulation of the Forces Goal 2030 in 2010, the development of the naval aviation is going on in accordance with the goal.

Bangladesh Naval Aviation joined in the search operation of missing Malaysia Airlines Flight 370 with a Dornier 228NG MPA in March 2014. The search was renewed in May 2014 when an Australian exploration company claimed to have traced aircraft debris in the Bay of Bengal.

== Insignia & Motto ==
Aircraft of the Bangladesh Navy use green and red roundels keeping similarity with the flag of Bangladesh. The naval ensign is placed at the tail of the aircraft. The service titles of Bangladesh Navy appear on the port side in English and starboard side in Bangla script.

The motto of Bangladesh Naval Aviation is "Eyes Over Horizion"

== Air bases ==
Currently, naval aviation operates from their own hangar situated beside the Shah Amanat International Airport at Chattogram and Patuakhali-Kuakata Airport in Patuakhali.

== Inventory ==
=== Current ===
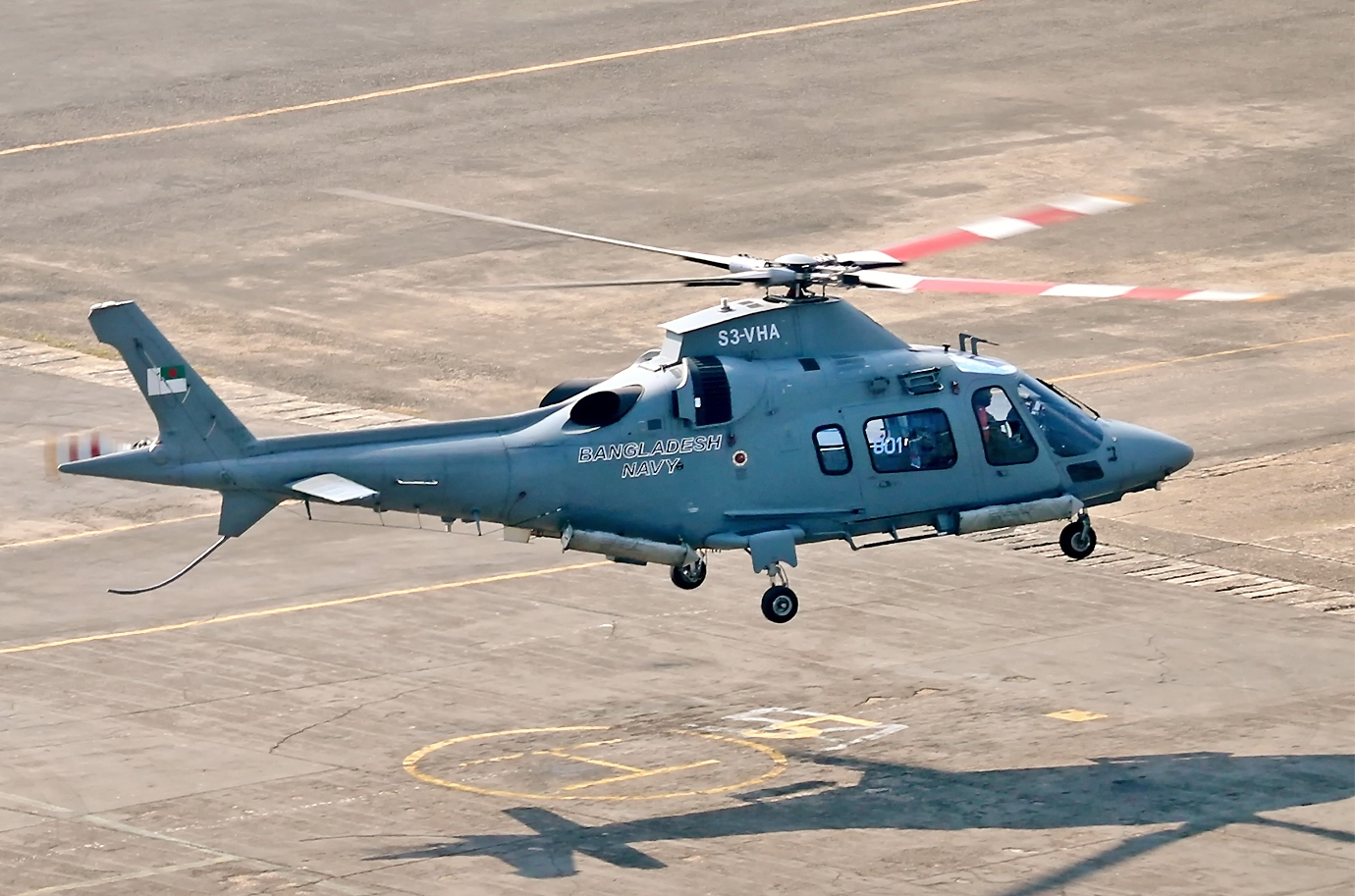
An AW109 helicopter of Bangladesh Navy

| Aircraft | Origin | Type | Variant | In service | Order | Notes |
Maritime Patrol
| Dornier 228 | Germany | patrol / surveillance | 228NG | 4 | | |
Helicopters
| AgustaWestland AW109 | Italy | utility / SAR | AW-109E | 4 | | |
Unmanned aerial vehicle
| Camcopter S-100 | Austria | UAV | - | - | | Received in 2025 |

== Future modernization plans ==
BN has issued two tenders for the procurement of four helicopters with anti-submarine warfare (ASW), anti-surface vessel warfare (ASuW), over-the-horizon targeting (OTHT), maritime search and rescue (MSAR), medical evacuation (MEDEVAC), casualty evacuation (CASEVAC) and special mission capabilities.

In December 2019, the prime minister discussed about the past, present and future development programs for the Bangladesh Navy at the winter passing out parade of the Bangladesh Naval Academy. She told that, there is a plan to induct more maritime patrol aircraft, anti-submarine warfare helicopters and long range MPA in the near future.

== See also ==
- Bangladesh Air Force
- Bangladesh Army Aviation Group
- Bangladesh Armed Forces
