= A. H. M. Fazlul Haque =

Bangladesh Air Force officer

- Military career
- Allegiance: Bangladesh
- Branch: Bangladesh Air Force
- Service years: 1985 - 2023
- Rank: Air Vice-Marshal
- Unit: No. 1 Squadron
- Commands: Vice Chancellor of BSMRAAU; AOC of BAF Base Matiur Rahman; FSR of BAF Zahurul Huq; FSR of BAF Base Paharkanchanpur
- Conflicts: UNAMET; MONUSCO

Abdullahil Habib Mohammad Fazlul Haque BBP, BSP, ndu, afwc, psc, GD(P) is a retired Bangladeshi 2 star Air Force officer who has served as assistant chief of air staff (operations). He is the founding vice chancellor of Bangabandhu Sheikh Mujibur Rahman Aviation and Aerospace University. Before join BSMRAAU, he served as air officer commanding of BAF Base Bir Shretra Matiur Rahman.

== Career ==
Haque was commissioned at Bangladesh Airforce in 1985 in General Duties (Pilot) branch. He served as the president of Shaheen Golf and Country Club Patenga (SGCCP) at 2016–17. To increase the defence cooperation initiatives with India he led a high level team which visit Indian Air Force Station Tezpur. During this visit, the team witnessed low level aerobatics by the SU-30 MKI, drill display by elite GARUDS and base security exercise. In November, 2021, he led the Bangladesh Air Force to collaborate with Pacific Air Forces Director Maj Gen Nathan Wills which illustrates the importance of working together to maintain an open, safe, and secure Indo-Pacific through enduring bilateral partnerships. He completed Defence Services Command and Staff Course from Mirpur, Defence Services Staff Course from Wellington, India and Armed Forces War Course from NDC, Mirpur. He has also attained Master of Science in Defence and Strategic Studies from University of Madras, India, Master of Science in Strategic Studies from National Defence University, China. Master of War Studies from National University, Bangladesh and Master of Business Administration from IBA, University of Dhaka, Bangladesh. He participated in three UN peacekeeping missions in UNIKOM, Kuwait, East Timor and as contingent commander in MONUSCO, DR Congo.
