= Aviation and Aerospace University, Bangladesh =

Aerospace engineering institution in Bangladesh

- অ্যাভিয়েশন অ্যান্ড অ্যারোস্পেস বিশ্ববিদ্যালয়, বাংলাদেশ
- Official Seal
- Motto: Space and Beyond
- Type: Public; Government Research
- Established: February 28, 2019; 7 years ago
- Chancellor: President Mirza Fakhrul Islam Alamgir
- Vice-Chancellor: Air Vice Marshal M Mustafizur Rahman
- Students: 430 (approx)
- Undergraduates: 370 (approx)
- Postgraduates: 60 (approx)
- Location: Tejgaon Airport, Dhaka, Bangladesh; 25°53′25.8″N 89°26′08.2″E
- Campus: Urban, 117 acres (0.47 km^{2})
- Language: English
- Education System: Co-education
- Colors: Metallic Gold and Midnight Blue
- Website: aaub.edu.bd

Aviation and Aerospace University, Bangladesh (AAUB) is a public university in Bangladesh. It is funded by the government and is Bangladesh's first higher educational institution on aerospace engineering. It is the 46th public university of Bangladesh. The permanent campus of AAUB is situated in Lalmonirhat, beside Lalmonirhat Airport. As per the admission circular the Aeronautical Engineering program began in January 2020.

== History ==
On July 11, 2018, the UGC drafted a law and submitted it to the Ministry of Education for setting up an aviation university in Bangladesh. At the Council of Ministers meeting on September 28, 2018, the approval for establishing this university/institution was granted, along with three more universities receiving policy approval on the same day. On February 28, 2019, former education minister Dipu Moni placed a bill in the National Parliament regarding the inauguration of this institution and it was passed. A temporary office has been set up at the old airport at Tejgaon, Dhaka to handle the activities of the university. Air Vice-Marshal AHM Fazlul Haque has been appointed as the founding Vice Chancellor of the institution on May 26, 2019. The current Vice Chancellor of the university is Air Vice-Marshal ASM Fakhrul Islam.

After the fall of the Sheikh Hasina-led Awami League government, Bangabandhu Sheikh Mujibur Rahman Aviation and Aerospace University was renamed to Aviation and Aerospace University, Bangladesh.

== Academic Programs ==
=== Bachelor of Science (B.Sc.) ===
- Aerospace Engineering
- Avionics Engineering
- Aircraft Maintenance Engineering (Aerospace)
- Aircraft Maintenance Engineering (Avionics)

=== Graduate ===
- MBA in Aviation Management
- M.Sc. in Aviation Safety and Accident Investigation
- LLM in International Air and Space Law
- M.Sc./M.Engg. in Space System Engineering
- M.Sc./M.Engg. in Satellite Communication Engineering

== List of vice-chancellors ==
- Air Vice-Marshal AHM Fazlul Haque (2019 - 2021)
- Air Vice-Marshal Muhammad Nazrul Islam (2021–2022)
- Air Vice Marshal ASM Fakhrul Islam (2022–2024)
- Air Vice Marshal A K M Manirul Bahar (2024–2025)
- Air Vice Marshal M Mustafizur Rahman (21 January 2026–Present)

== See also ==
- Defence industry of Bangladesh
