= Atlas C4EYE =

Unmanned aerial vehicle

ATLAS C4EYE

General information
- Type: UAV
- National origin: Slovenia
- Manufacturer: C-Astral

History
- Variant: ATLAS ppX

The ATLAS C4EYE is a tactical reconnaissance UAV produced by C-Astral Aerospace Ltd from Ajdovščina in Slovenia. The ATLAS is a NATO class 1 mini-tactical UAV under 2.9 kg MTOW designed for ISR or ISTAR missions for army reconnaissance and Special Forces relying on low signature detection. It carries a payload consisting of a gyro-stabilized micro-gimbal with EO/IR sensors and laser illuminator. The ATLAS 4EYE is hand-launched, water-resistant and carries up-to-date avionics, data-link and guidance solutions.

== History ==
The ATLAS C4EYE has been developed on the operational experience of the Bramor family of UAVs. It has been first introduced in 2018 at Eurosatory exhibition, France.

The micro UAV was deployed by C-Astral in a series of flight and feasibility trials conducted with Nato units in 2019. It can be used in surveillance, convoy support, target detection, search-and-rescue, special operations, first responder missions, fire control, civilian defence, infrastructure control, and security missions. ATLAS C4EYE UAV features a blended wing body (BWB) fuselage made of advanced composite materials. Its airframe offers high stability and low radar signature. The aircraft's fuselage integrates IP-67 rated connectors and seals to enable landing in water. Advanced aerodynamics and low noise signature further make ATLAS UAV stealthy and quiet.

C-Astral Aerospace, has successfully completed the 2020 Expeditionary Organic Tactical Airborne ISR Capability Set (EOTACS) evaluation conducted by the US Special Operations Command (USSOCOM). The capabilities of the ATLAS C4EYE sUAS were demonstrated to USSOCOM observers in Feb, 2020. These observers included experts from combat development directorates as well as operators from the Marine Corps Forces Special Operations Command (MARSOC), US Army Special Operations Command (USASOC), and the Naval Special Warfare Command (NSWC-WARCOM).The evaluation demonstrated that the Atlas C4EYE met all the requirements and demonstrated its platform specifications. The Atlas C4EYE has been assessed as a mature UAS ready to be integrated into active Special Operations units, law enforcement, firefighting as well as non-governmental ecological monitoring tasks.

== Specifications (ATLAS C4EYE) ==
General characteristics

- Length: 0.82 m (2 ft 8 in)
- Wingspan: 1.55 m (5 ft 1 in)
- Max takeoff weight: 2.4 kg (5 lb)
- Powerplant: 1 × C-Astral Brushless electric, 0 kW (0 hp)

Performance

- Maximum speed: 108 km/h (67 mph, 58 kn)
- Range: 15 km (9.3 mi, 8.1 nmi)
- Service ceiling: 5,000 m (16,000 ft)

Armament

- No armament

Avionics

- Micro-gimbal EO/IR/LI
