= A. S. M. Fakhrul Islam =

Bangladesh Air Force officer

- Military career
- Allegiance: Bangladesh
- Branch: Bangladesh Air Force
- Service years: 1985 - 2025
- Rank: Air Vice Marshal
- Unit: No. 21 Squadron BAF
- Commands: ACAS (Operations) at Air Headquarters; Senior Directing Staff (Air) at National Defence College; Vice Chancellor of BSMRAAU; AOC of BAF Base Zahurul Haq; Commandant of BAC; Commandant of Bangladesh Air Force Academy
- Conflicts: UNOSOM II; UNIKOM

Abu Salah Mohammed Fakhrul Islam, OSP, GUP, ndc, afwc, psc, GD (P) is a retired Bangladesh Air Force officer who served as assistant chief of air staff (operations). Prior to that, he was senior directing staff (air) at National Defense College, Mirpur. Prior to this position, he was vice chancellor of Aviation and Aerospace University, Bangladesh.

Before that, he was commandant of the Bangabandhu Aeronautical Centre. He also served as air officer commanding (AOC) at BAF Base Zahurul Haque, Patenga, Chattogram.

== Career ==
Islam was commissioned into the Bangladesh Air Force in 1985 in General Duties (Pilot) branch. He was commandant of Bangladesh Air Force Academy (BAFA) while he was air commodore. He also served as director of air operations, director of welfare and ceremony, director of admin coord, provost marshal of Bangladesh Air Force and director general (training) at Armed Forces Division. In October 2022 he has been appointed as the new vice-chancellor of BSMRAAU. In July 2024, he was appointed as assistant chief of air staff (operations). He retired on 30 January 2025 from his active service.
