= Lalmonirhat Airport =

University and military Airport in Lalmonirhat, Bangladesh

BAF Station Lalmonirhat বিএএফ স্টেশন লালমনিরহাট
- IATA: none; ICAO: VGLM

Summary
- Airport type: Military
- Owner: Civil Aviation Authority of Bangladesh
- Operator: Bangladesh Air Force & Aviation and Aerospace University Bangladesh
- Location: Lalmonirhat, Rangpur, Bangladesh
- Coordinates: 25°53′15″N 89°25′59″E

Map
- Location of airport in Bangladesh

BAF Station Lalmonirhat (ICAO: VGLM) or commonly known as Lalmonirhat Airport is a one of nine Bangladeshi Air Force bases. It is located near Lalmonirhat, at the north side border of Bangladesh. It was built in 1931 as a military airbase. During the Second World War (1939–1945), the Allied Forces used it as a forward airbase for its operations in Burma (now Myanmar) and other countries of southeast Asia. Presently, Lalmonirhat aerodrome is under the possession of Bangladesh Air Force (BAF). Now, the airport has been given to Bangladesh Aerospace and Aviation University to make it a permanent campus.

== Airlines and destination ==
Currently, there are no scheduled flights operated by any airlines.

== See also ==
- List of airports in Bangladesh
