= Bramor C4EYE =

Unmanned aerial vehicle

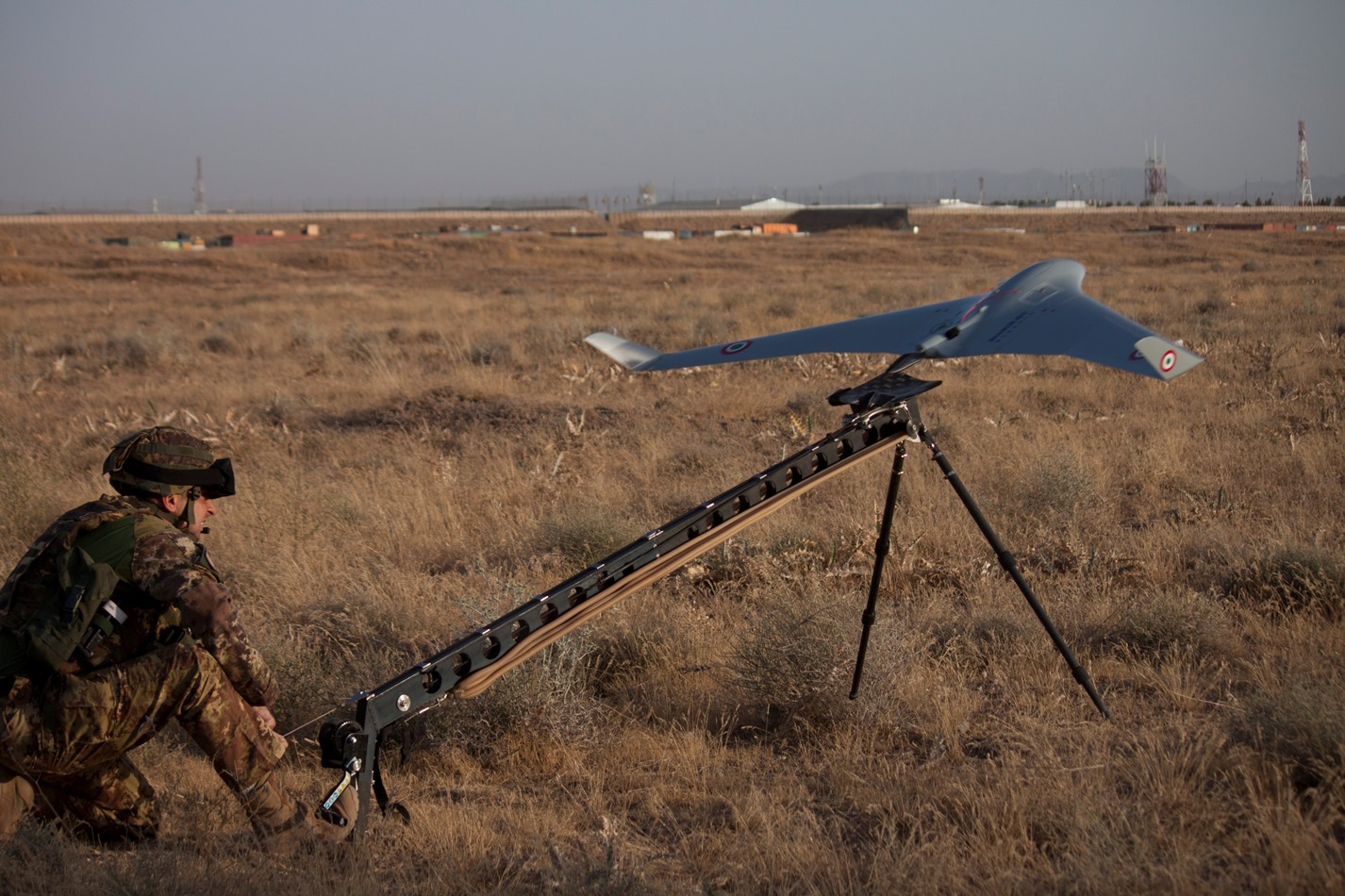
- Italian Army launching a Bramor C4EYE

General information
- Type: Reconnaissance / Surveillance
- National origin: Slovenia
- Manufacturer: C-Astral Aerospace Ltd
- Status: Active
- Primary users: Bangladesh Army

History
- Variant: BRAMOR sAR

The Bramor C4EYE (or otherwise known as Belin ) is a tactical reconnaissance UAV classified as a NATO class 1 mini tactical drone with less than 5 kg MTOW. It was developed and built by C-Astral Aerospace Ltd from Ajdovščina in Slovenia.

It is equipped with an EO/IR/LI gyro-stabilized micro-gimbal with optical and infrared sensor, laser illuminator. The radio control and live audio / video transmission is carried over a MANET mesh network with AES encryption. The simultaneous transmission of metadata allows the integration of tactical data into situational awareness software suites (i.e. proprietary battle management system or Android Team Awareness Kit). It is also equipped with the latest generation of autopilot with GPS navigation system.

It can be used by 1 or 2 operators for surveillance and reconnaissance (ISR) missions, target acquisition ISTAR, close air support JTAC i.e. missions for special operations, convoy tracking, target detection, search and rescue, first aid missions, civil defense, wildfire containment and mitigation, infrastructure control and security missions.

The Bramor C4EYE has a basic operational radius of 42 km (extendable) and an endurance of 3.5 hours with daytime and nighttime flight capability. and AN/PVS-7B/D, AN/PVS-14 and AN/AVS-9 compatible IR optional beacons.

It is named after the European mole cricket, Gryllotalpa gryllotalpa.

== Operational history ==
The BRAMOR C4EYE UAS is combat proven and has been operational since mid-2010s.

== Operators ==
- Bangladesh: Bangladesh Army
- Italy
- Slovenia
- Cyprus
- Cameroon
- Ukraine
- Montenegro

== Specifications (BRAMOR C4EYE) ==
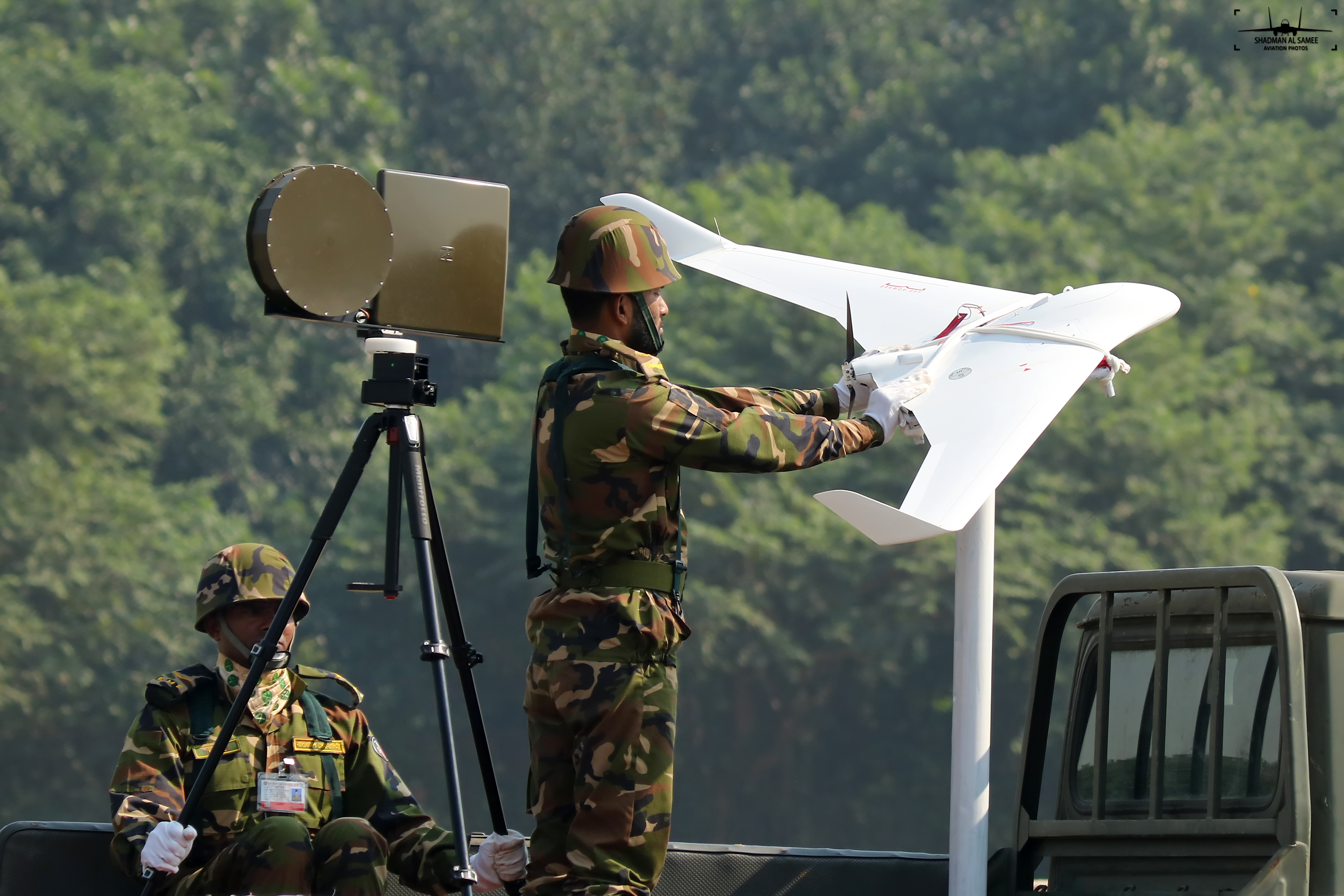
Bangladesh Army Bramor C4EYE in Victory Day Parade 2017.

General characteristics

- Length: 0.96 m (3 ft 2 in)
- Wingspan: 2.30 m (7 ft 7 in)
- Max takeoff weight: 4.7 kg (10 lb)
- Powerplant: 1 × C-Astral Brushless electric, 0 kW (0 hp)

Performance

- Maximum speed: 108 km/h (67 mph, 58 kn)
- Range: 42 km (26 mi, 23 nmi)
- Service ceiling: 5,000 m (16,000 ft)

Armament

- No armament

Avionics

- Micro-gimbal EO/IR/LI & other payloads
