= M. Shaheen Iqbal =

Chief of Naval Staff of Bangladesh Navy

Shaheen Iqbal NBP, NUP
- মোহাম্মদ শাহীন ইকবাল
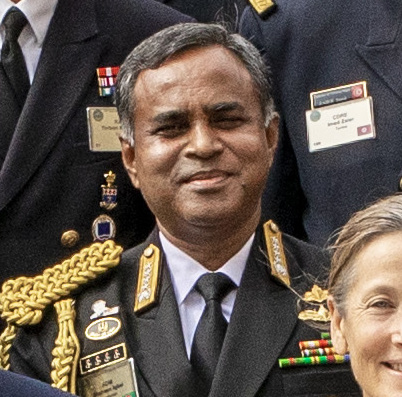
- Admiral M Shaheen Iqbal

16th Chief of Naval Staff
- In office 25 July 2020 – 24 July 2023
- President: Abdul Hamid; Mohammed Shahabuddin
- Prime Minister: Sheikh Hasina
- Preceded by: Aurangzeb Chowdhury
- Succeeded by: Mohammad Nazmul Hassan

Personal details
- Born: 1964 (age 61–62) Comilla, East Pakistan, Pakistan
- Education: Naval War College; National Defence College; BAF Shaheen College Dhaka
- Awards: Noubahini Padak (NBP); Nou Utkorso Padak (NUP)

Military service
- Allegiance: Bangladesh
- Branch/service: Bangladesh Navy
- Years of service: 1982–2023
- Rank: Admiral
- Commands: Chief of Naval Staff; Assistant Chief of Naval Staff (Operations); Assistant Chief of Naval Staff (Personnel); Commander, Chittagong Naval Area (COMCHIT); Commander, Khulna Naval Area (COMKHUL); Commodore, BNS Titumir; Director of National Security Intelligence
- Battles/wars: UNAMI

Mohammad Shaheen Iqbal (Note: (TAS), NBP, NUP, ndc, afwc, psc) is a retired four-star admiral of the Bangladesh Navy who served as chief of the naval staff till 24 July 2023.

== Early life and education ==
Iqbal was born in Comilla, then in East Pakistan (now in Chittagong Division, Bangladesh), to a Bengali Muslim military family. He finished his secondary and high school education at BAF Shaheen College Dhaka. Iqbal was enlisted at the Bangladesh Naval Academy in 1980 and was commissioned in the executive branch as a torpedo anti-submarine coordinating (TAS) officer in 1982. He is a graduate of the Defence Services Command and Staff College, Armed Forces War College, and the National Defence College. Iqbal also attended the operational planning domain course from the Naval War College at Newport, United States.

== Military career ==
Iqbal commanded three warships: one offshore missile vessel, one large patrol craft, and one minesweeper vessel. He was also commander of two naval areas and one naval base, and furthermore, the director of the School of Maritime Warfare and Tactics, National Security Intelligence, and the SWADS. At naval headquarters, Iqbal was in charge of naval intelligence, naval operations and was the assistant chief of naval staff for personnel and then operations. He was promoted to vice admiral in July 2020 and appointed the chief of naval staff. He was promoted to admiral in September of the same year. Iqbal went into retirement on 24 July 2023 and was succeeded by Admiral Mohammad Nazmul Hassan.

== See also ==
- List of serving admirals of the Bangladesh Navy
- Chief of Naval Staff (Bangladesh)

Military offices
Preceded by Admiral Aurangzeb Chowdhury	Chief of Naval Staff; 25 July 2020 – 24 July 2023	Succeeded by Mohammad Nazmul Hassan
