= Akhtar Habib =

Bangladeshi admiral

Vice Admiral Akhtar Habib NBP, NGP
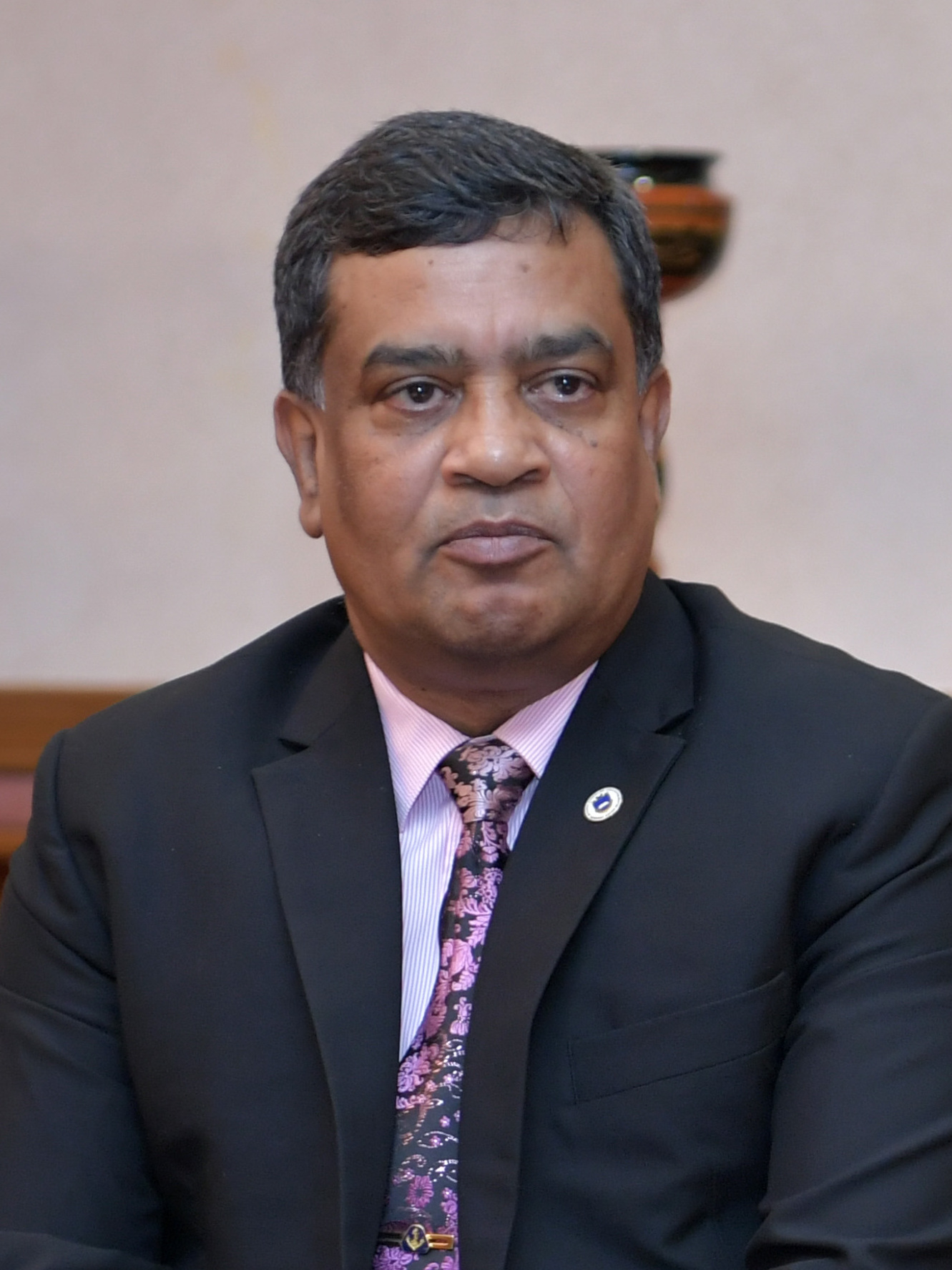
- Habib in Malé (2020)

Bangladesh High Commissioner to Maldives
- In office 6 March 2017 – 31 January 2020
- President: Mohammad Abdul Hamid
- Prime Minister: Sheikh Hasina
- Preceded by: Kazi Sarwar Hossain
- Succeeded by: Mohammad Nazmul Hassan

Personal details
- Awards: Noubahini Padak (NBP); Nou Gourobh Padak (NGP); Commendation Padak

Military service
- Allegiance: Bangladesh
- Branch/service: Bangladesh Navy; Bangladesh Coast Guard
- Years of service: 1982 – 2020
- Rank: Vice Admiral
- Commands: Commander, Chittagong Naval Area (COMCHIT); Commander of Special Warfare Diving and Salvage; Commander, Naval Administrative Authority Dhaka (ADMIN DHAKA); Commander, BN Flotilla (COMBAN)
- Battles/wars: UNIKOM

Akhtar Habib (Note: (ND), NBP, NGP, BCGMS, ndc, ncc, psc, BN) is a retired three star admiral of the Bangladesh Navy, former high commissioner of Bangladesh to Maldives, and the antecedent commander of the Chittagong naval area.

== Early life and education ==
Habib enlisted to Bangladesh Naval Academy in 1980 and received his commission from the Mürwik Naval School in 1982. Habib was a navigator officer and attended the Naval War College, Defence Services Command and Staff College and the National Defence College. He also completed three master's degrees in defence and strategic studies at the University of Madras, in defence studies from National University and a Master of Social Science in security studies from the Bangladesh University of Professionals.

== Military career ==
Habib commanded one warship, the Bangladesh naval flotilla, one offshore vessel and the naval administrative authority at Dhaka. He also has served in Special Warfare Diving and Salvage, National Security Intelligence, Special Security Force, the Armed Forces Division and was the commander of west zone at Bangladesh Coast Guard. He is a former director of naval operations at naval headquarters and the commander of the Chittagong naval area. He received BNS Swadhinata and BNS Prottay, newly purchased ships for the Chittagong naval area from China. In November 2013, he was promoted to rear admiral while serving at Chittagong naval command.

In March 2017, Habib was appointed as the high commissioner of Bangladesh to Maldives. He served as the commissioner till January 2020. Habib went to leave per retirement and promoted to brevet vice admiral in February 2020. Habib was awarded the Nou Bahini Padak in April 2020, post-retirement by the former prime minister Sheikh Hasina.
