= Mohammad Nizamuddin Ahmed =

Chief of Naval Staff of Bangladesh Navy

Nizamuddin Ahmed NBP, OSP
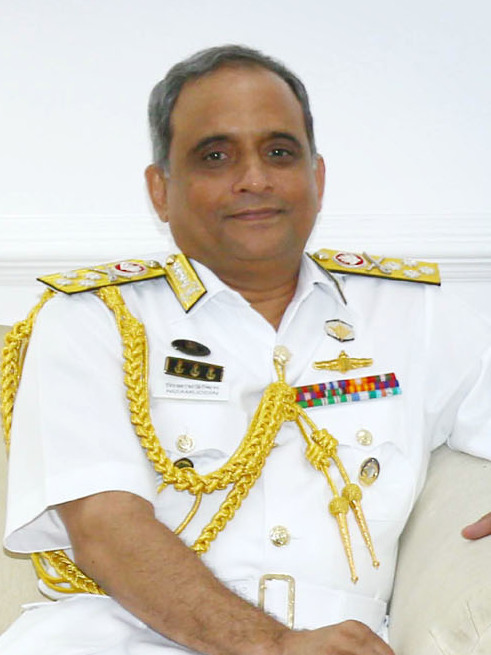

14th Chief of Naval Staff
- In office 27 January 2016 – 26 January 2019
- President: Abdul Hamid
- Prime Minister: Sheikh Hasina
- Preceded by: Farid Habib
- Succeeded by: Aurangzeb Chowdhury

Personal details
- Born: 1 April 1960 (age 66) Madaripur, East Pakistan, Pakistan
- Awards: Noubahini Padak (NBP); Oshamanno Sheba Padak (OSP); Commendation Padak

Military service
- Allegiance: Bangladesh
- Branch/service: Bangladesh Navy; Bangladesh Coast Guard
- Years of service: 1981–2019
- Rank: Admiral
- Commands: Chief of Naval Staff; Chairman, Chittagong Port Authority; Commander, Chittagong Naval Area, (COMCHIT); Director (Operations), Bangladesh Coast Guard
- Battles/wars: UNOCI

Mohammad Nizamuddin Ahmed (Note: (TAS), NBP, OSP, BCGM, ndc, psc, BN) (born 1 April 1960) is a retired four-star admiral of the Bangladesh Navy and the antecedent chief of naval staff. Nizam was also the former commander of the Chittagong naval area and chairman of Chittagong Port Authority. He is the second four-star officer of the navy after M. Farid Habib.

== Early life and education ==
Nizam was born in Madaripur in the then East Pakistan (now in Dhaka Division, Bangladesh) in 1960 to Mohammad Abdur Rashid, a secondary school teacher, and Mohammad Fazilatunnesa Rashid, who was a homemaker.

Nizam finished secondary school at United Islamia Government High School in Madaripur and high school at Madaripur Government College. He enlisted in the Bangladesh Naval Academy on 30 January 1979 and was commissioned from the Marshal Tito Naval Academy in Yugoslavia on 1 August 1981 in the executive branch. Nizam was a torpedo anti-submarine coordinating (TAS) officer. After joining the Navy, he obtained a degree in Inter Forces Staff Course from France, the United States, and Canada and is also a graduate of the National Defence College and the Defence Services Command and Staff College.

== Military career ==
Nizam commanded two warships, one torpedo craft, one offshore vessel, three patrol craft, and the Chittagong naval area. He taught at the Training and Administration Ship School, Bangladesh Naval Academy, and was the vice president of the Inter Services Selection Board at Dhaka Cantonment. Nizam also served as director of personnel services at naval headquarters and director of operations at the Bangladesh Coast Guard.

Nizam joined Chittagong Port Authority as chairman on 26 February 2012. During his tenure, he took initiatives to open the first Inland Container Terminal of Bangladesh at the port of Pangaon. He returned to naval headquarters in January 2016. Nizam was promoted to vice admiral, and Inter-Services Public Relations announced Nizam's nomination to succeed Admiral Farid Habib. Nizam began serving as the 15th chief of naval staff on 27 January 2016. He was promoted to admiral in March 2016. As the navy chief, Nizam was instrumental in the inauguration of the Port of Payra in Barisal Division on 13 August 2016. Nizam went to leave per retirement in January 2019 and was succeeded by then Vice Admiral Aurangzeb Chowdhury as the chief of naval staff.

== Honours ==

Extraordiary Service Medal	Operation Dabanal Medal	Cyclone Relief of 1991 Medal	
1991 National Election Medal	1996 National Election Medal	2001 National Election Medal	Silver Jubilee Medal
27 years service	20 years service	10 years service	UNOCI Medal

Military offices
Preceded by Admiral Mohammad Farid Habib	Chief of Naval Staff (Bangladesh); 27 January 2016 – 26 January 2019	Succeeded by Admiral Aurangzeb Chowdhury
