= Mohammad Nazmul Hassan =

Former chief of Naval Staff of the Bangladesh Navy

Admiral Nazmul Hassan OSP, NPP
- মোহাম্মাদ নাজমুল হাসান
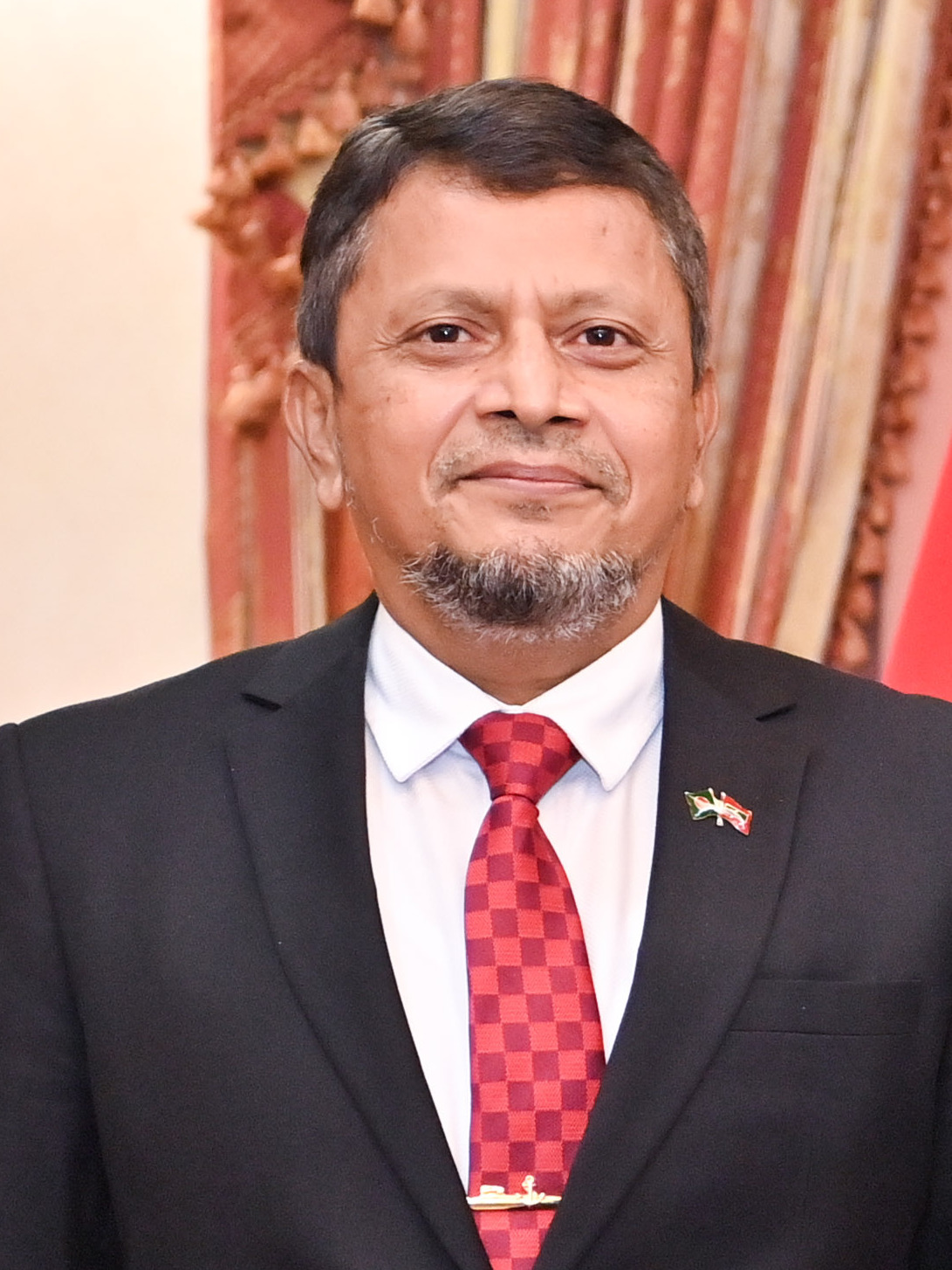
- Nazmul in 2020

17th Chief of Naval Staff
- In office 24 July 2023 – 23 July 2026
- President: Mohammed Shahabuddin
- Prime Minister: Sheikh Hasina; Muhammad Yunus (acting); Tarique Rahman
- Preceded by: Shaheen Iqbal
- Succeeded by: Khondkar Misbah-ul-Azim

Bangladesh High Commissioner to the Maldives
- In office 31 August 2020 – February 2022
- President: Abdul Hamid; Mohammed Shahabuddin
- Prime Minister: Sheikh Hasina
- Preceded by: Akhtar Habib
- Succeeded by: Abul Kalam Azad

Personal details
- Born: February 2, 1967 (age 59)
- Spouse: Begum Nadia Sultana
- Children: 2
- Education: Bangladesh Naval Academy; United States Naval War College; National Defence College; University of Chittagong
- Awards: Oshamanno Sheba Padak; Nau Parodorshita Padak

Military service
- Allegiance: Bangladesh
- Branch/service: Bangladesh Navy
- Years of service: 1986 – 2026
- Rank: Admiral
- Commands: Chief of Naval Staff; Assistant Chief of Naval Staff (Operations); Assistant Chief of Naval Staff (Personnel); Commander, Chittagong Naval Area (COMCHIT); Commander, BN Fleet; Commander of Bangladesh Naval Aviation; Commander of Special Warfare Diving and Salvage Command
- Battles/wars: UNPROFOR

Mohammad Nazmul Hassan (Note: (G), OSP, NPP ndc, ncc, psc) (born 2 February 1967) is a retired four star admiral of the Bangladesh Navy who has served as the 17th chief of naval staff. Earlier he was assistant chief of naval staff (operations), (personnel) and commander, Chattogram naval area. Before that, he was high commissioner of Bangladesh to the Republic of Maldives.

== Military career ==
Nazmul was commissioned in the Bangladesh Navy on 1 July 1986 in the naval artillery department of executive branch. He commanded four warships, one small patrol craft, the Chittagong naval area and the Bangladesh naval fleet. Nazmul was also the commandant of Bangladesh Naval Academy and director of naval aviation, naval operations, naval intelligence at Naval Headquarters and furthermore the SWADS. He was assigned to Maldives as high commissioner in 2020. During his tenure in high commission, Nazmul signed a bilateral agreement with Maldives' health minister Ahmed Naseem for the AstraZeneca vaccines, in which Bangladesh has received 201,600 vaccine doses as a gesture of goodwill. In response, medical team of the Bangladesh Armed Forces sent to Maldives to assist in the Maldives Government's vaccination programme. Nazmul also aided the medical team of the Bangladesh Army medical corps to assist the vaccination program during COVID-19 situation of the government of Maldives, the same year he also orchestrated the centenary Birthday of Sheikh Mujibur Rahman's ceremony and the first bilateral visit of former prime minister Sheikh Hasina. Nazmul left the high commission in order to return to naval headquarters and was succeeded by rear admiral Azad in January 2022. He was appointed assistant chief of naval staff in January 2023 and on July same year, he was ameliorated to vice admiral and appointed the chief of naval staff succeeding Shaheen Iqbal. He was promoted to admiral in September 2023, and retired in July 2026.

=== Rehabilitation Programs in Bhasan Char ===
As commander Chittagong naval area, Nazmul continued the process of rehabilitation of forcibly displaced Burmese citizens in Bhasan Char. Moreover, he made a special contribution to the rehabilitation of homeless poor people in remote coastal areas by implementing shelter projects during the fourth Hasina ministry.

== Personal life ==
Nazmul is married to Begum Nadia Sultana Hasan and the couple have a son.

Military offices
Preceded by M Shaheen Iqbal	Chief of Naval Staff; 23 July 2023	Incumbent
