= M. Farid Habib =

Bangladeshi Chief of Naval Staff

Farid Habib NBP, OSP
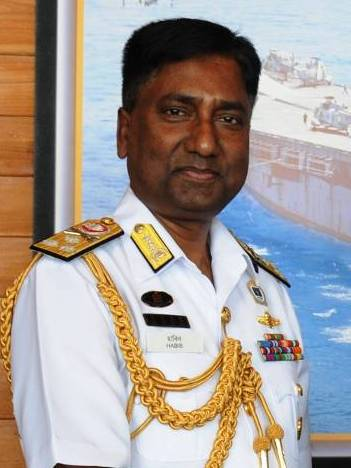
- Habib in 2015

13th Chief of Naval Staff
- In office 28 January 2013 – 27 January 2016
- President: Zillur Rahman; Abdul Hamid
- Prime Minister: Sheikh Hasina
- Preceded by: Zahir Uddin Ahmed
- Succeeded by: Mohammad Nizamuddin Ahmed

Personal details
- Born: 22 April 1959 (age 67) Tangail, East Pakistan, Pakistan
- Awards: Noubahini Padak (NBP); Oshamanno Sheba Padak (OSP); Commendation Padak

Military service
- Allegiance: Bangladesh
- Branch/service: Bangladesh Navy; Bangladesh Coast Guard
- Years of service: 1979 – 2016
- Rank: Admiral
- Commands: Chief of Naval Staff; Assistant Chief of Naval Staff (Operations); Assistant Chief of Naval Staff (Personnel); Naval Administrative Authority Dhaka (Admin Dhaka); Director (Planning), Bangladesh Coast Guard; Commodore Commanding Khulna (COMKHUL); Commodore Commanding BN Flotilla (COMFLOT)

Mohammed Farid Habib (Note: (ND), NBP, OSP, BCGM, ndc, psc) (born 24 February 1959) is a retired four-star admiral who was the former chief of naval staff of the Bangladesh Navy and the incumbent chairman of the trustee board of University of Scholars. He is the first four-star officer of the navy.

== Early life and education ==
Habib was born in 1959 in the village of Ichhapur in Kalihati Upazila of Tangail District, then East Pakistan (now in Dhaka Division, Bangladesh). He is the youngest son of Mohammad Ali, who was a deputy secretary to the government of East Pakistan and later the Constituent Assembly of Bangladesh.

Habib was one of the pioneer cadets of Bangladesh Naval Academy in 1976. He received basic naval training as a midshipman at Britannia Royal Naval College in the United Kingdom. Habib was commissioned in the executive branch of the Bangladesh Navy on 1 January 1979 as a navigator officer. Vice Admiral Zahir Uddin Ahmed, his predecessor, is his course mate. Habib obtained missile and minesweeping courses from China and specialization on navigation and direction from Australia and, furthermore, Pakistan. He graduated from the Defence Services Command and Staff College and also from the Surface Warfare Officers' School (SWOS) in Newport, United States. He attended the National Defence Course and Capstone Course at the National Defence College and the Joint Warfare Course and Sea Safety Course in the United Kingdom. He furthermore obtained two master's degrees in Defence Studies (MDS) from National University, Bangladesh and Flag Officers Combined Force Maritime Component Commanders Course from University of Hawaiʻi at Mānoa in United States.

== Military career ==
Habib commanded three warships, one large patrol craft, one mine-sweeper missile craft, the Khulna naval area, the naval administrative authority at Dhaka, and the Bangladesh naval flotilla. As captain, Habib served at Bangladesh Coast Guard as director of planning. He also taught at the Defence Services Command and Staff College and served as commandant of the Bangladesh Naval Academy. Habib spent a considerable length of time at naval headquarters, serving as naval secretary, naval judge advocate general, director of operations and naval plans and furthermore the assistant chief of naval staff for operations and then personnel. Habib also worked with the Bangladesh Navy Hydrographic & Oceanographic Center as chairman and served as executive director for the Bangladesh Sea Scouts.

Habib was promoted to vice admiral and appointed chief of naval staff on 20 January 2013 and assumed office on 28 January 2013. He was promoted to the rank of admiral on 17 January 2016 and went into retirement ten days later. He was succeeded by Vice Admiral Nizamuddin Ahmed as naval chief. He has been awarded the highest scouts award, Silver Tiger, by President Zillur Rahman.

== Personal life ==
He is married to Begum Hafiza Habib and has a son and a daughter. He loves to pass his leisure time reading various periodicals and magazines and plays cricket, lawn tennis, and golf.

Military offices
Preceded by Vice Admiral Zahir Uddin Ahmed	Chief of Naval Staff; 2013-2016	Succeeded by Admiral Mohammad Nizamuddin Ahmed
