= Order of precedence in Bangladesh =

Relative preeminence of officials for ceremonial purposes

The order of precedence in Bangladesh, officially known as Warrant of Precedence, is a symbolic hierarchy that lays down the relative precedence in terms of ranks of important functionaries belonging to the executive, legislative and judicial organs of the state, including members of the foreign diplomatic corps. When a person holds more than one position, the highest position is considered. The Warrant of Precedence was challenged by a writ petition. On November 10, 2016, the Appellate Division of the Bangladesh Supreme Court issued a full judgment on the writ of Warrant of Precedence. The Government filed a review petition, thought the Appellate Division did not stay the execution of the judgment. Cabinet division revised and published a new warrant of precedence in July 2020 which contradicts the judgement of the Supreme Court on Warrant of Precedence.

== Order ==
Warrant of Precedence of Bangladesh (Revised up to July, 2020)
Rank	Position
1	President of the Peoples Republic of Bangladesh (Commander-in-Chief of the Armed Forces) – Mirza Fakhrul Islam Alamgir
2	Prime Minister of the Peoples Republic of Bangladesh – Tarique Rahman
3	Speaker of the Parliament – Hafiz Uddin Ahmad, Bir Bikrom
4	Chief Justice of the Republic – Zubayer Rahman Chowdhury; Former Presidents of the Republic
5	Cabinet Ministers of the Republic; Chief Whip – Md. Nurul Islam; Deputy Speaker of the Parliament – Barrister Kayser Kamal; Leader of the Opposition in the Parliament – Shafiqur Rahman
6	Persons holding appointments accorded status of a Minister without being members of the Cabinet of the Republic
7	Ambassadors Extraordinary and Plenipotentiary and High Commissioners of the Commonwealth countries accredited to Bangladesh
8	Chief Election Commissioner – AMM Nasir Uddin; Deputy Chairman of the Planning Commission; Deputy Leader of the Opposition in Parliament – Syed Abdullah Mohammed Taher; Justice(s) of the Supreme Court (Appellate Division); Ministers of State of the Republic; Whip
9	Election Commissioners; Justice(s) of the Supreme Court (High Court Division); Persons holding appointments accorded status of a Minister of State
10	Deputy Ministers of the Republic
11	Envoys Extraordinary and Ministers Plenipotentiary accredited to Bangladesh; Persons holding appointments accorded status of a Deputy Minister
12	Cabinet Secretary – Dr. Nasimul Gani; Chiefs of Staff of the Four-Star Rank of Full General and equivalent –; Chief of Army Staff (Bangladesh Army) – General Waker-Uz-Zaman; Chief of Naval Staff (Bangladesh Navy) – Admiral Khondkar Misbah-ul-Azim; Chief of Air Staff (Bangladesh Air Force) – Air Chief Marshal Hasan Mahmood Khan; Principal Secretary to the Prime Minister – A. B. M. Abdus Sattar
13	Members of Parliament
14	Visiting Ambassadors and High Commissioners not accredited to Bangladesh
15	Attorney-General – Barrister Md. Ruhul Quddus Kazal; Comptroller and Auditor General – Md. Nurul Islam; Ombudsman; Governor of Bangladesh Bank – Md Mostaqur Rahman
16	Chairman of the Public Service Commission; Chairman of the University Grants Commission; Inspector-General of Police (Head of Bangladesh Police Service & Chief Executive of Internal Security Affairs); Members of the Planning Commission; Officers of the rank of Major General in the Army and equivalent in the Navy and the Air Force; Secretaries to the government including Secretary to the Parliament
17	Chargé d'affaires en pied of Diplomatic Missions of Foreign Countries in Bangladesh; Director General of National Security Intelligence – Major General Abu Mohammad Sarwar Farid; Full-time members of the University Grant Commission; National Professors; Officers holding the status of Secretaries to the Government; Vice-Chancellors of Universities
18	Mayors of City Corporations (within the jurisdiction of their respective corporation)
19	Additional Attorney General; Additional Secretaries to the Government; Chairman, Bangladesh Atomic Energy Commission; Chairman, Bangladesh Board of Land Administration; Chairman, Bangladesh Agricultural Development Corporation; Chairman, Bangladesh Chemical Industries Corporation; Chairman, Bangladesh Jute Mills Corporation; Chairman, Bangladesh Oil, Gas and Mineral Corporation (Petrobangla); Chairman, Bangladesh Power Development Board; Chairman, Bangladesh Steel and Engineering Corporation; Chairman, Bangladesh Sugar and Food Industries Corporation; Chairman, Bangladesh Textile Mills Corporation; Chairman, Bangladesh Water Development Board; Chairman, Tariff Commission; Chargé d'affaires ad-interim of Diplomatic Missions of Foreign Countries in Bangladesh; Directors General of the Anti-Corruption Bureau; Executive Vice Chairman of Bangladesh Agricultural Research Council; Managing Director, Bangladesh Krishi Bank; Managing Director, Sonali Bank; Professors of Universities in Selection Grade; Visiting Ambassadors and High Commissioners of Bangladesh
20	Chairman, Bangladesh Council of Scientific and Industrial Research; Chairman, Tea Board; Chairman, T&T Board; Chief Architect of the Government; Chief Conservator of Forests; Chief Engineer, Roads and Highways Department; Chief Engineer, Public Works Department; Executive Chairman, Bangladesh Export Processing Zone Authority; Director General, Department of Agricultural Extension; Director of Fisheries; Director General of Health Services; Director of Livestock Services; Director General of Primary Education; Director General of Secondary and Higher Secondary Education; Director General of Technical Education; Division Chief of the Planning Commission; Managing Director, Bangladesh Biman; Managing Directors of other Nationalised Commercial Banks; Members, National Board of Revenue; Members, Public Service Commission; Officers of the status of Additional Secretary to the Government; Registrar of the Supreme Court; Vice Chairman, Export Promotion Bureau
21	Additional Inspector Generals of Police; Chairman, Bangladesh Inland Water Transport Authority; Chairman, Bangladesh Inland Water Transport Corporation; Chairman, Bangladesh Small and Cottage Industries Corporation; Chairman of the Civil Aviation Authority; Chairman, Dhaka Improvement Trust; Chairman, National Broadcasting Authority; Chairman, Bangladesh Petroleum Corporation; Chairman, Port Authority; Chairman, Bangladesh Rural Electrification Board; Chairman, Trading Corporation of Bangladesh; Chairman, Water and Sewerage Authority; Chairman, Bangladesh Handloom Board; Chairman, Bangladesh Sericulture Development Board; Chairman, Bangladesh Jute Corporation; Chairman, Bangladesh Forest Industries Development Corporation; Chairman, Bangladesh Fisheries Development Corporation; Chairman, Bangladesh Parjatan Corporation; Chairman, Bangladesh Road Transport Corporation; Chief Controller of Imports and Exports; Chief Engineer, Housing and Settlement Department; Chief Engineer, Department of Public Health Engineering; Divisional Commissioners of the Divisions within their respective charges; Directors (if full-time member of the Board of Directors): Bangladesh Chemical Industries Corporation, Bangladesh Jute Mills Corporation, Bangladesh Steel and Engineering Corporation, Bangladesh Sugar and Food Industries Corporation, Bangladesh Textile Mills Corporation; Director General of Ansar and VDP; Director General, Bangladesh Rural Development Board; Director General of Immigration and Passports; Director General, Export Promotion Bureau; Director General of Fire Service and Civil Defence; Director General of Food; Director General of Geological Survey; Director General of Industries; Director General of Land Record and Surveys; Director General of Post Offices; Director General of Population Control; Director General of Relief and Rehabilitation; Director General of Shipping; General Manager of Bangladesh Railway; Joint Secretaries to the Government; Managing Director, Bangladesh Shipping Corporation; Managing Directors of the Financial Institutions; Managing Director, Jiban Bima Corporation; Managing Director, Sadharan Bima Corporation; Managing Director, Bangladesh Film Development Corporation; Members (if full-time member of the Board of Directors): Bangladesh Atomic Energy Commission, Bangladesh Agricultural Development Corporation, Bangladesh Oil, Gas and Mineral Corporation, Bangladesh Power Development Board, Bangladesh Water Development Board; Ministers and Deputy High Commissioners (of the rank of Ministers in Embassies, High Commissions and Missions located in Bangladesh); Officers of the rank of Brigadier General in the Army and equivalent in the Navy and the Air Force; Registrar, Co-Operative Societies; Surveyor General of Bangladesh
22	Additional Chief Architect; Additional Chief Engineers of Government Departments; Additional Director-General, Health Services; Chairman, Chittagong Development Authority; Chairman, Rajshahi Development Authority; Chairman, Khulna Development Authority; Collectors of Customs and Excise; Commissioners of Divisions outside their respective charges; Commissioners of Taxes; Consuls General; Controller General of Accounts; Controller General of Defence Finance; Counsellors of Embassies, High Commissions and Legations of Foreign and Commonwealth Government; Deputy Inspectors General of Police within their respective charges; Director of Agriculture Extension; Director-General, Bangladesh Agricultural Research Institute; Director General, Bangladesh Jute Research Institute; Director General, Bangladesh Rice Research Institute; Director General, Department of Social Services; Director General, National Institute of Mass Communication; Director General of Youth Development Department; Director, Military lands and Cantonment; Director General, Bangladesh Industrial Technical Assistance Centre; Director General, Bangladesh Standard and Testing Institute; Inspector General of Prisons; Joint Chief, Planning Commission; Member, Bangladesh Council of Scientific and Industrial Research (if full-time member of the Board of Directors); Member, Bangladesh Export Processing Zone Authority (if full-time member of the Board of Directors); Member, Tea Board (if full-time member of the Board of Directors); Officers of the rank of Full Colonel in the Army and equivalent in the Navy and the Air Force; Officers of the status of Joint Secretary to the Government; Principals of Medical and Engineering Colleges and Professors of Universities
23	Additional Commissioners (within their respective charges); Director, Bangladesh Jute Corporation (if full-time member of the Board of Directors); Director, Bangladesh Forest Industries Corporation (if full-time member of Board of Directors); Director, Bangladesh Fisheries Development Corporation (if full-time member of the Board of Directors); Director, Bangladesh Tourism Corporation (if full-time member of the Board of Directors); Director, Bangladesh Film Development Corporation (if full-time member of the Board of Directors); Director, Bangladesh Road Transport Corporation (if full-time member of the Board of Directors); Director of Education (Directorate of Secondary and Higher Education); Director, Petroleum Corporation (if full-time member of the Board of Directors); Director, Bangladesh Rural Development Board (if full-time member of the Board of Directors); Director, Trading Corporation of Bangladesh (if full-time member of the Board of Directors); Mayors of Civic Corporations outside their respective charges; Member, Bangladesh Inland Water Transport Authority (if full-time member of the Board of Directors); Member, Bangladesh Inland Water Transport Corporation (if full-time member of the Board of Directors); Member, Bangladesh Handloom Board (if full-time member of the Board of Directors); Member, Bangladesh Sericulture Board (if full-time member of the Board of Directors); Member, Civil Aviation Authority (if full-time member of the Board of Directors); Member, Port Authority (if full-time member of the Board of Directors); Member, Rural Electrification Board (if full-time member of the Board of Directors); Member, Bangladesh Shipping Corporation (if full-time member of the Board of Directors); Military, Naval and Air Attaches to Embassies and Legations and Military, Naval and Air Advisors to High Commissions; Professors of Medical and Engineering Colleges
24	Chairmen of District Councils (if elected) within their respective charges; Commandant, Bangladesh Marine Academy; Deputy Commissioners & District Magistrates within their respective charges; Deputy Inspectors General of Police outside their charges; Director, Bangladesh Industrial Technical Assistance Centre (if full-time member of the Board of Directors); Director, Bangladesh Standard and Testing Institute (if full-time member of the Board of Directors); District and Sessions Judges within their respective charges; Officers of the rank of Lieutenant Colonel in the Army and equivalent in the Navy and the Air Force
25	Chairmen (if elected) of class I Municipalities within their respective charges; Chairmen (if elected) of Upazila Parishads within their respective charges; Civil Surgeons within their respective charges; Deputy Secretaries to the government; Officers of the rank of Major in the Army and equivalent in the Navy and the Air Force; Superintendents of Police within their respective charges
