= Aurangzeb Chowdhury =

Bangladeshi naval officer and navy chief

Aurangzeb Chowdhury NBP, OSP
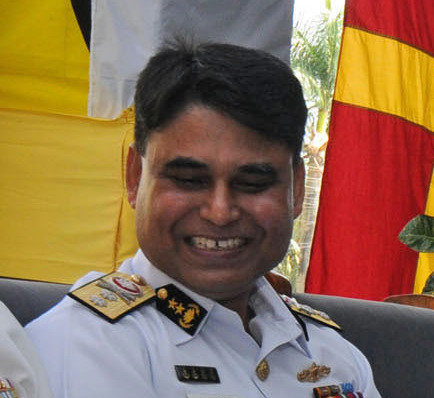
- Chowdhury as rear admiral in 2011

15th Chief of Naval Staff
- In office 26 January 2019 – 24 July 2020
- President: Abdul Hamid
- Prime Minister: Sheikh Hasina
- Preceded by: Mohammad Nizamuddin Ahmed
- Succeeded by: Shaheen Iqbal

14th Director General of Bangladesh Coast Guard
- In office 16 February 2016 – 26 January 2019
- President: Abdul Hamid
- Prime Minister: Sheikh Hasina
- Preceded by: Makbul Hossain
- Succeeded by: Ashraful Haq

Personal details
- Born: Abu Mozaffar Mohiuddin Mohammed Aurangzeb Chowdhury; 28 September 1959 (age 66) Old Dacca, East Pakistan, Pakistan
- Spouse: Afroza Aurangzeb
- Children: 2
- Awards: Noubahini Padak (NBP); Oshamanno Sheba Padak (OSP); German Armed Forces Badge for Military Proficiency; Commendation Padak

Military service
- Allegiance: Bangladesh
- Branch/service: Bangladesh Navy; Bangladesh Coast Guard
- Years of service: 10 December 1980 - 25 July 2020
- Rank: Admiral
- Commands: Chief of Naval Staff; Director General Bangladesh Coast Guard; Assistant Chief of the Naval Staff (Operation); Assistant Chief of Naval Staff (Personnel); Commander, COMCHIT; Commodore, Superintendent Dockyard; Commodore, BNS Haji Mohshin

Aurangzeb Chowdhury (Note: (G), NBP, OSP, BCGM, PCGM, BCGMS, ndc, psc, BN) (born 28 September 1959) is a former four-star admiral and the former chief of staff of the Bangladesh Navy. Prior to that, he was the director general of the Bangladesh Coast Guard.

== Early life and education ==
Aurangzeb was born as Abu Mozaffar Mohiuddin Mohammed Aurangzeb Chowdhury on 28 September 1959 in Old Dhaka in then East Pakistan. He enlisted in the Bangladesh Naval Academy in 1978 and received his commission into the executive branch as a gunnery officer in 1980. Aurangzeb is a graduate of National Defence College and Defence Services Command and Staff College. He is also an alumnus of Surface Warfare Officers' School (SWOS) in Newport, United States.

== Military career ==
Aurangzeb commanded one warship, two offshore vessels, one large patrol craft, one naval base, and the Chittagong naval area. He furthermore served as the commandant of the Bangladesh Marine Academy, principal of the Bangladesh Marine Fisheries Academy, and commodore of BN Dockyard. In naval headquarters, Aurangzeb was the assistant chief of naval staff of operations and then personnel.

He was made the director general of the Bangladesh Coast Guard on 15 February 2016. Aurangzeb was promoted to vice admiral and was appointed the chief of naval staff on 26 January 2019. He was promoted to admiral in February the same year. His tenure was truncated due to his retirement age, and he went into retirement just after a year and a half as naval chief. He was succeeded by Vice Admiral Shaheen Iqbal.

== Personal life ==
He is married to Afroza Aurangzeb, a gynaecologist of the Apollo Hospitals chain. The couple has a son and a daughter.

Military offices
Preceded by Admiral Mohammad Nizamuddin Ahmed	Chief of Naval Staff (Bangladesh); 26 January 2019 – 25 July 2020	Succeeded by Admiral M Shaheen Iqbal
