= Zahir Uddin Ahmed =

Bangladeshi admiral

Vice Admiral Zahir Uddin Ahmed NBP
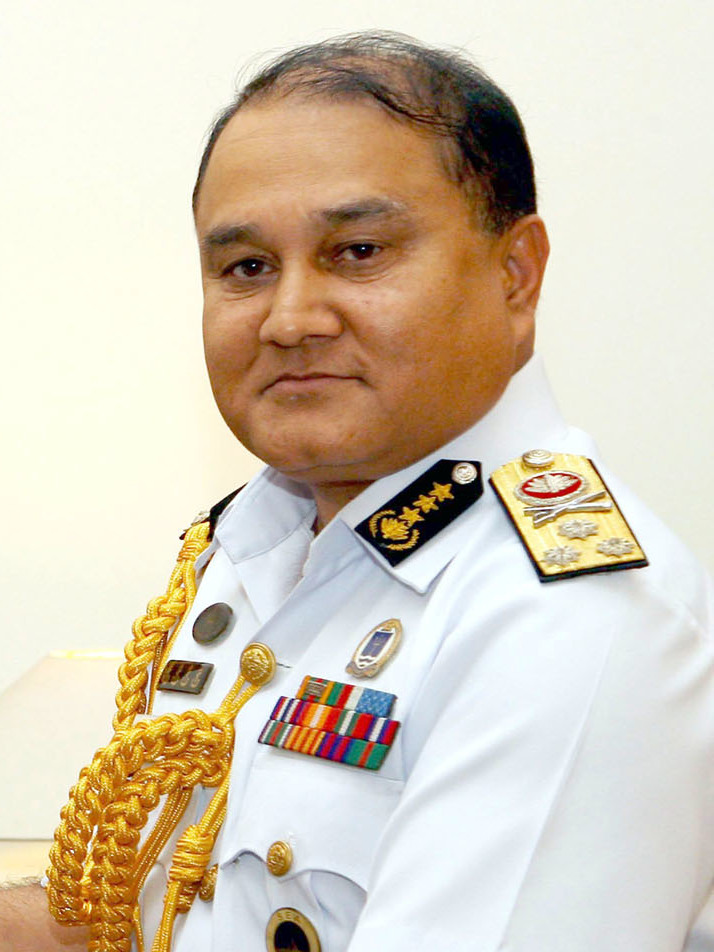
- Ahmed on 9 July 2012

12th Chief of Naval Staff
- In office 29 January 2009 – 28 January 2013
- President: Iajuddin Ahmed; Zillur Rahman
- Prime Minister: Sheikh Hasina
- Preceded by: Sarwar Jahan Nizam
- Succeeded by: Farid Habib

9th Director General of Bangladesh Coast Guard
- In office 26 January 2009 – 27 January 2009
- President: Iajuddin Ahmed
- Prime Minister: Sheikh Hasina
- Preceded by: Moqsum Ul Kader
- Succeeded by: Moqsum Ul Kader

Personal details
- Born: 21 May 1957 (age 68) Gazipur, East Pakistan, Pakistan
- Awards: Noubahini Padak (NBP); Commendation Padak

Military service
- Allegiance: Bangladesh
- Branch/service: Bangladesh Navy; Bangladesh Coast Guard
- Years of service: 1979–2013
- Rank: Vice Admiral
- Commands: BNS Umar Farooq; BNS Abu Bakr; BNS Bangabandhu; BNS Shaheed Moazzem; BNS Titumir; Director of Signals, Naval Headquarters; Commandant of Bangladesh Marine Academy; Commodore Commanding BN Flotilla (COMBAN); Commander Chittagong Naval Area (COMCHIT); Director General, Bangladesh Coast Guard; Chief of Naval Staff

Zahir Uddin Ahmed (Note: (ND), NBP, BCGM, ndc, psc) (born 21 May 1957) is a retired three star admiral who served as the chief of naval staff of the Bangladesh Navy. He is the first naval chief from the Bangladesh Naval Academy.

== Early life and education ==
Zahir was born in Gazipur of then East Pakistan (now in Dhaka Division, Bangladesh). He was one of the pioneer cadets of Bangladesh Naval Academy in 1976 with M. Farid Habib, his successor. He was commissioned in executive branch as navigator officer in 1979. He is a graduate of the Defence Services Command and Staff College and the National Defence College. Zahir also took navigators seminar from the ND School at INS Valsura in Jamnagar, India.

== Military career ==
Zahir commanded three warships in which he was the pioneer commander of the Bangladesh navy flagship BNS Bangabandhu. He was also the overseer of two naval bases, the Bangladesh naval flotilla, Bangladesh naval fleet and the Chittagong naval area. Zahir as commodore, furthermore served as director drafting authority at naval headquarters and the commandant of Bangladesh Marine Academy. As rear admiral he was the assistant chief of naval staff for operations and was the most truncated director general of Bangladesh Coast Guard for one day.

Zahir was appointed chief of the naval staff on 26 January 2009 and assumed the office on 29 January 2009. He was promoted to the rank of vice admiral on 3 October 2009. Zahir went into retirement on 29 January 2013. He was succeeded by his course mate vice admiral Farid Habib. Zahir was awarded the highest 'Bangladesh Navy Medal' and 'Bangladesh Coast Guard Medal' for outstanding contribution in different fields of Navy and Coast Guard.

== Personal life ==
Zahir is married to Shabnam Ahmed. They have a son and a daughter together.

== See also ==
- Military of Bangladesh

Military offices
Preceded by Vice Admiral Sarwar Jahan Nizam	Chief of Naval Staff 2009–2013	Succeeded by Admiral M. Farid Habib
