= M. Makbul Hossain =

Bangladeshi military personnel

Makbul Hossain NBP, OSP
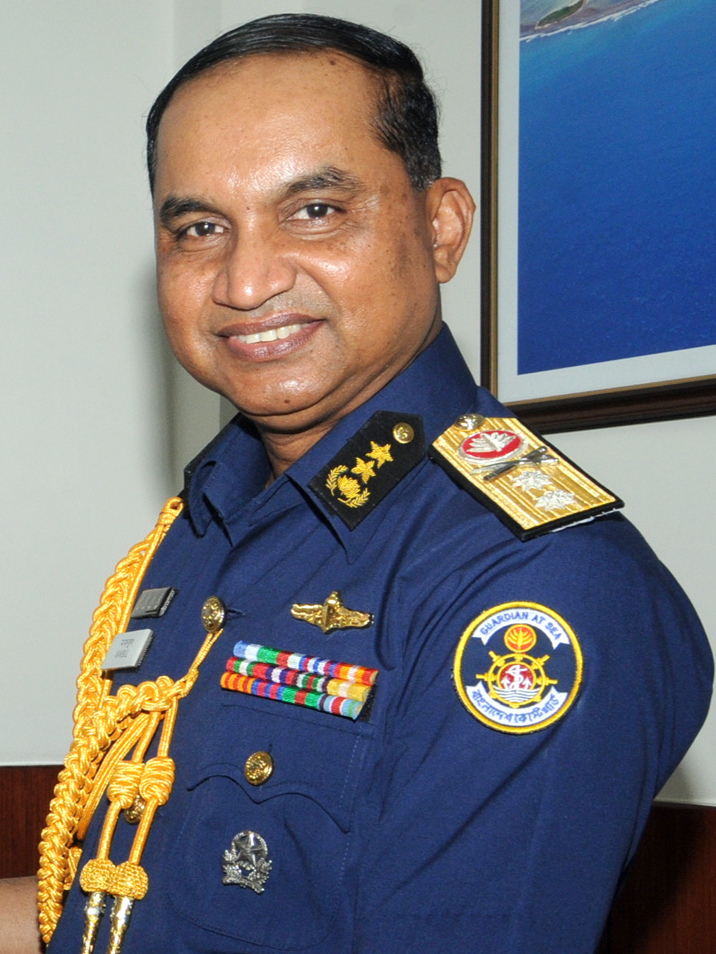

13th Director General of Bangladesh Coast Guard
- In office 4 December 2013 – 15 February 2016
- President: Abdul Hamid
- Prime Minister: Sheikh Hasina
- Preceded by: Kazi Sarwar Hossain
- Succeeded by: Aurangzeb Chowdhury

Personal details
- Born: 14 August 1961 (age 65) Mirzapur, East Pakistan, Pakistan
- Awards: Noubahini Padak (NBP); Oshamanno Sheba Padak (OSP)

Military service
- Allegiance: Bangladesh
- Branch/service: Bangladesh Navy; Bangladesh Coast Guard
- Years of service: 1981 - 2019
- Rank: Rear Admiral
- Commands: Assistant Chief of the Naval Staff (Operation); Assistant Chief of Naval Staff (Personnel); Commander, Chittagong Naval Area (COMCHIT); Commander, Naval Administrative Authority Dhaka (ADMIN DHAKA); Commander, Special Warfare Diving and Salvage (COMSWADS)

Mohammad Makbul Hossain (Note: (TAS), NBP, OSP, BCGMS, ndu, psc) (born 14 August 1961) is a retired two-star officer of the Bangladesh Navy. He is the former director general of the Bangladesh Coast Guard and antecedent assistant chief of naval staff for operations and personnel.

== Early life and education ==
Makbul was born in 1961 in Tangail District, then East Pakistan (now Dhaka Division, Bangladesh). He enlisted in the Bangladesh Navy as an officer cadet in January 1979. He was commissioned into the executive branch on 1 August 1981. Makbul is an anti-submarine warfare (ASW) specialist and has undergone a 5-year UT course at the Marshal Tito Naval Academy in Yugoslavia. Makbul is a graduate of Defence Services Command and Staff College and completed a defence and strategic course from the National Defence University in China. Makbul also attended the Weapon and Junior Officer's tactics course from the School of Infantry and Tactics, programming and administrative courses from the University of Hawaiʻi at Mānoa, and, furthermore, counter terrorism courses from the National War College in the United States. He obtained his master's degree in defence studies from the National University, Bangladesh.

== Military career ==
Makbul commanded a frigate, two patrol craft, a minesweeper, and a composite squadron of fast attack craft. He led two naval bases, the east zone at the Bangladesh Coast Guard, the naval administrative authority at Dhaka, the Chittagong naval area and the Special Warfare Diving and Salvage branch. At naval headquarters, Makbul served as the director of purchasing and welfare. He also served as a director at the headquarters of the Directorate General of Forces Intelligence and, moreover, was the principal of the Bangladesh Marine Fisheries Academy.

Makbul was promoted to rear admiral in 2013 and appointed the assistant chief of naval staff for personnel. Soon after, he was appointed the director general of the Bangladesh Coast Guard. During his tenure, Makbul cited the ports of Bangladesh, especially Chittagong, as highly fastened against illegal trafficking due to the efforts of the coast guard. Makbul also cited the coast guard having provided the 111,631 square kilometre economic area under his orchestration. He returned to the navy in February 2016, while Rear Admiral Aurangzeb Chowdhury succeeded him as the director general of the coast guard. Makbul was later designated as the assistant chief of naval staff for operations. He welcomed the chief of naval staff for the Royal Saudi Navy, Vice Admiral Fahad Bin Abdullah Al-Ghofaily, in September 2019 on behalf of the naval chief and gave him the guard of honour. Additionally, Makbul oversaw the United States-Bangladesh joint C.A.R.A.T. exercise the same year. He was awarded the Noubahini Padak, Oshamanno Sheba Padak of the Navy and Bangladesh Coast Guard Medal (Service) for his distinguished service and went into retirement in December 2019.

== Personal life ==
Makbul is married and has one son and one daughter. He is a keen golfer and an occasional writer of various news articles. He wrote a thesis on better accommodation facilities for developing countries for The Daily Star newspaper in 2022.
