= Silver Jubilee Medal =

Silver Jubilee Medal may refer to:

- King George V Silver Jubilee Medal, a commemorative medal instituted to celebrate the 25th anniversary of the accession of King George V in the UK in 1935
- Silver Jubilee Medal (Bangladesh Armed Forces), a service medal of the Bangladesh Armed Forces
- Queen Elizabeth II Silver Jubilee Medal
