= Admiral (Bangladesh) =

Highest achieved rank in the Bangladesh Navy

Admiral এ্যাডমিরাল
- The insignia for the rank of admiral is the Nymphaeaceae the Emblem of Bangladesh, above crossed sword and baton and four Octagram.

- Vehicle Star plate of admiral
- Country: Bangladesh
- Service branch: Bangladesh Navy
- Abbreviation: ADM
- Rank group: Admiral; Flag officer
- Rank: Four Star
- NATO rank code: OF-9
- Non-NATO rank: O-10
- Next lower rank: Vice admiral
- Equivalent ranks: General (Army); Air Chief Marshal (Air force)

Admiral (Bengali: এ্যাডমিরাল, romanized: Admiral) is a four-star commissioned naval flag officer rank in the Bangladesh Navy. It is the highest achieved rank in the Bangladesh Navy. Admiral ranks above the three-star rank of Vice Admiral. The rank is denoted as a full-fledged Admiral to extricate subordinate officers like Vice Admiral and Rear Admiral which are also flag officers.

The rank was established in 2016, when Admiral M. Farid Habib was promoted to this rank. The Chief of Naval Staff (CNS) is the only officer awarded the rank.

== Insignia ==
The badges of rank have a crossed sword and baton over four eight-pointed stars and the Shapla emblem above, on a golden shoulder board.

The uniform code also has golden gorget patches with four stars which represents the four star rank.

In accumulation to this, the double-breasted reefer jacket have four golden sleeve stripes consisting of a broad band with three narrower bands.

== Appointment and term length ==
The position is appointed by the Prime Minister of The People's Republic of Bangladesh with the advice and consent of the President of Bangladesh. The maximum length of the term is 3–4 years. The position constituted through the act of Navy Ordinance, 1961 (Ordinance No. XXXV of 1961).

== List of Admirals ==
- Admiral M. Farid Habib
- Admiral Mohammad Nizamuddin Ahmed
- Admiral Aurangzeb Chowdhury
- Admiral M Shaheen Iqbal
- Admiral Mohammad Nazmul Hassan
- Admiral Khondkar Misbah-ul-Azim

== See also ==
- List of serving admirals of the Bangladesh Navy
- Military ranks of Bangladesh
