= Chief of Naval Staff (Bangladesh) =

Head of the Bangladesh Navy

- নৌবাহিনী প্রধান
- Emblem

- Flag of the Chief of Naval Staff

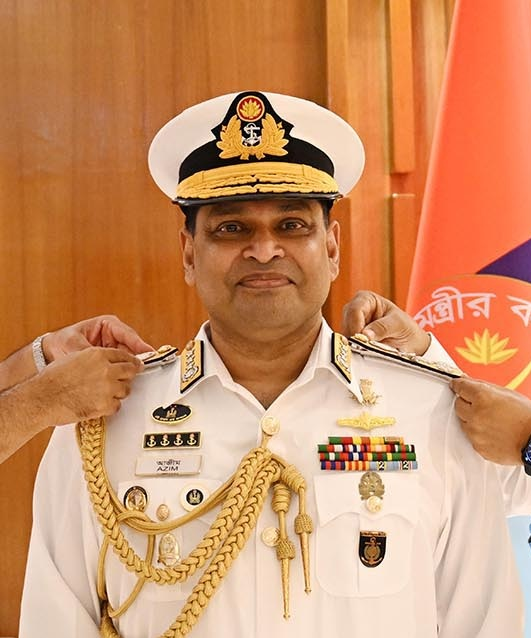
- Incumbent; Admiral Khondkar Misbah-ul-Azim; NPP since 23 July 2026
- Bangladesh Navy
- Type: Bangladesh Navy service chief
- Abbreviation: CNS
- Member of: National Committee on Security Affairs
- Reports to: President; Prime Minister
- Seat: Naval Headquarters, Banani, Dhaka
- Appointer: The Prime Minister; with President advice and consent
- Term length: 3 years
- Constituting instrument: The Navy Ordinance, 1961 (Ordinance No. XXXV OF 1961)
- Formation: 7 April 1972; 54 years ago
- First holder: Captain Nurul Huq
- Salary: ৳160000 (US$1,300) per month (incl. allowances)
- Website: navy.mil.bd

The Chief of Naval Staff (CNS) (Bengali: নৌবাহিনী প্রধান, romanized: Noubāhinī prôdhān) is the professional head and highest-ranking commissioned officer of the Bangladesh Navy. The Chief of Naval Staff is responsible for the overall command, control, administration, training, and operational readiness of the naval force, and serves as the principal naval adviser to the Government of Bangladesh on matters of maritime security and naval strategy.

The office is generally held by an officer with the rank of Admiral and is appointed by the President of Bangladesh acting on the advice of the Prime Minister of Bangladesh. The Chief of Naval Staff is a member of the Armed Forces Division and plays a key role in safeguarding Bangladesh’s maritime interests, including the protection of territorial waters, exclusive economic zone (EEZ), and international sea lines of communication.

== List of appointees ==
The following table chronicles the appointees to the office of the Chief of the Naval Staff since the independence of Bangladesh. Prior to 2016, from 2007 the appointment was held by a Vice Admiral (three-star naval officer) and from 1972 to 2007 CNS's rank was Rear Admiral.

List of all Chiefs of Naval Staff of Bangladesh Navy:

No.	Picture	Chief of Naval Staff	Took office	Left office	Time in office
1	Nurul Huq(E), psc	Captain; Nurul Huq (E), psc (1936–2021)	7 April 1972	6 November 1973	1 year, 213 days
2	Musharraf Hussain Khan(ND), psc	Rear Admiral; Musharraf Hussain Khan (ND), psc (1932–2018)	7 November 1973	3 November 1979	5 years, 361 days
3	Mahbub Ali Khan(TAS), psn	Rear Admiral; Mahbub Ali Khan (TAS), psn (1934–1984)	4 November 1979	6 August 1984 †	4 years, 276 days
4	Sultan Ahmed(G), ndc, psc	Rear Admiral; Sultan Ahmed (G), ndc, psc (1938–2012)	6 August 1984	14 August 1990	6 years, 8 days
5	Amir Ahmed Mustafa(G), psc	Rear Admiral; Amir Ahmed Mustafa (G), psc	15 August 1990	2 May 1991	260 days
6	Muhammad Mohaiminul Islam(S/M), ncc, psc	Rear Admiral; Muhammad Mohaiminul Islam (S/M), ncc, psc (1941–2020)	4 June 1991	3 June 1996	4 years, 304 days
7	Mohammad Nurul Islam(ND), ncc, psc	Rear Admiral; Mohammad Nurul Islam (ND), ncc, psc	4 June 1996	3 June 1999	2 years, 303 days
8	Abu Taher(E), ncc, psc	Rear Admiral; Abu Taher (E), ncc, psc	4 June 1999	3 June 2002	2 years, 303 days
9	Shah Iqbal Mujtaba(ND), ndc, psc	Rear Admiral; Shah Iqbal Mujtaba (ND), ndc, psc (born 11 February 1948)	4 June 2002	9 January 2005	2 years, 281 days
10	M. Hasan Ali Khan(TAS), ndc, psc	Rear Admiral; M. Hasan Ali Khan (TAS), ndc, psc (1950–2013)	9 January 2005	9 February 2007	2 years, 31 days
11	Sarwar Jahan Nizam(G), ndu, psc	Vice Admiral; Sarwar Jahan Nizam (G), ndu, psc (1952–2025)	10 February 2007	28 January 2009	2 years, 18 days
12	Zahir Uddin Ahmed(ND), NBP, BCGM, ndc, psc	Vice Admiral; Zahir Uddin Ahmed (ND), NBP, BCGM, ndc, psc (born 1957)	29 January 2009	28 January 2013	3 years, 365 days
13	M. Farid Habib(ND), NBP, OSP, BCGM, ndc, psc	Admiral; M. Farid Habib (ND), NBP, OSP, BCGM, ndc, psc (born 1959)	28 January 2013	27 January 2016	2 years, 364 days
14	Mohammad Nizamuddin Ahmed(TAS), OSP, ndc, psc	Admiral; Mohammad Nizamuddin Ahmed (TAS), OSP, ndc, psc (born 1960)	27 January 2016	26 January 2019	2 years, 364 days
15	Aurangzeb Chowdhury(G), NBP, OSP, BCGM, PCGM, BCGMS, ndc, psc	Admiral; Aurangzeb Chowdhury (G), NBP, OSP, BCGM, PCGM, BCGMS, ndc, psc (born 1959)	26 January 2019	25 July 2020	1 year, 181 days
16	M Shaheen Iqbal(TAS), NBP, NUP, ndc, afwc, psc	Admiral; M Shaheen Iqbal (TAS), NBP, NUP, ndc, afwc, psc (born 1964)	25 July 2020	24 July 2023	2 years, 363 days
17	Mohammad Nazmul Hassan(G), OSP, NPP, ndc, ncc, psc	Admiral; Mohammad Nazmul Hassan (G), OSP, NPP, ndc, ncc, psc (born 1967)	24 July 2023	23 July 2026	2 years, 364 days
18	Khondkar Misbah-ul-Azim(TAS), NBP, NPP, ndu, afwc, psc, PhD	Admiral; Khondkar Misbah-ul-Azim (TAS), NBP, NPP, ndu, afwc, psc, PhD	23 July 2026	Incumbent	92 days

== See also ==
- List of serving admirals of the Bangladesh Navy
- Chief of Army Staff (Bangladesh)
- Chief of Air Staff (Bangladesh)
