= Shafiq-ur-Rahman (commodore) =

Bangladeshi politician (born 1945)

Commodore Shafiq-ur-Rahman

1st Director General of Bangladesh Coast Guard
- In office 22 February 1995 – 6 August 1998
- President: Abdur Rahman Biswas; Shahabuddin Ahmed
- Prime Minister: Khaleda Zia; Shahabuddin Ahmed (acting); Sheikh Hasina
- Succeeded by: Mohammed Abdul Motalib

Personal details
- Born: 3 December 1945 (age 80) Sonatala, Bengal, British India
- Party: Bangladesh Nationalist Party

Military service
- Allegiance: Pakistan (before 1972); Bangladesh
- Branch/service: Pakistan Navy; Bangladesh Navy; Bangladesh Coast Guard
- Years of service: 1967 - 1998
- Rank: Commodore
- Commands: Director, Naval Plans; Commodore Commanding Chittagong (COMCHIT); Director General of Bangladesh Coast Guard

Shafiq-ur-Rahman (born, 3 December 1945) is a Bangladesh Nationalist Party politician and the former director general of the Bangladesh Coast Guard.

== Career ==
Shafiq-ur-Rahman was the director general of the Bangladesh Coast Guard from February 1995 to August 1998. In 1998, the Bangladesh Anti Corruption Commission filed cases against him at the Cantonment Police Station for embezzling 70 million taka. He retired as a naval commodore. He is a director of Ashiyan Group and executive director of Sentry Security Services Limited. He was arrested in September 2016 on the charges filed by the Anti Corruption Commission. He is a member of the national executive committee of the Bangladesh Nationalist Party.
