= Khondkar Misbah-ul-Azim =

Chief of Naval Staff of the Bangladesh Navy

Admiral Khondkar Misbah-ul-Azim NBP, NPP
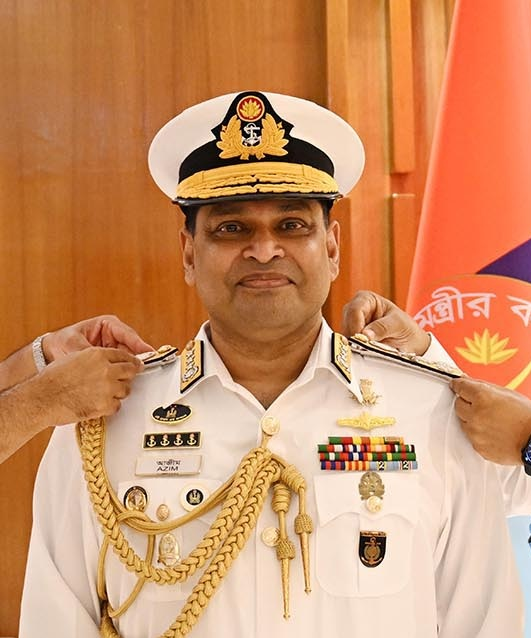
- Azim in 2026

18th Chief of Naval Staff
- Incumbent
- Assumed office 23 July 2026
- President: Mohammed Shahabuddin; Hafiz Uddin Ahmad (acting); Mirza Fakhrul Islam Alamgir
- Prime Minister: Tarique Rahman
- Preceded by: Mohammad Nazmul Hassan

Ambassador of Bangladesh to Oman
- In office 20 February 2025 – 23 July 2026
- President: Mohammed Shahabuddin
- Prime Minister: Muhammad Yunus (acting); Tarique Rahman
- Preceded by: Nazmul Islam
- Succeeded by: TBA

Personal details
- Spouse: Begum Nurtaz Azim
- Children: 2
- Education: Bangladesh Naval Academy
- Awards: Noubahini Padak (NBP); Nou Parodorshita Padak (NPP)

Military service
- Allegiance: Bangladesh
- Branch/service: Bangladesh Navy
- Years of service: 1987 – present
- Rank: Admiral
- Commands: Commander, Chittagong Naval Area (COMCHIT); Commander, Dhaka Naval Area (COMDHAKA); Commander, Submarine (COMSUB); Commandant of Bangladesh Naval Academy; BNS Umar Farooq; BNS Shaikat

Khondkar Misbah-ul-Azim (Note: (TAS), NBP, NPP, ndu, afwc, psc, BN) is a four-star officer of the Bangladesh Navy, currently serving as the 18th Chief of Naval Staff. He previously served as the Bangladesh ambassador to Oman. Prior that he was commander of two naval areas and the Bangladesh Naval Academy.

== Early life and education ==
Azim enlisted to Bangladesh Naval Academy in 1985 and was commissioned in the executive branch on 1 January 1987. Also he was ranked 1st in both seniority and merit in the 87A batch of the Bangladesh Navy. Azim is a torpedo anti-submarine (TAS) coordinating officer and has undergone basic training course at Malaysian Maritime Academy. He is a graduate of Defence Services Staff College from India and the Armed Force War College. Azim also completed his advanced command course from the People's Liberation Army National Defence University in China.

== Military career ==
Azim commanded one warship, two offshore vessel, one large patrol craft, one minesweeper craft and two naval areas. Azim further more led the submarines squadrons, the Bangladesh Naval Academy and director of naval operations at naval headquarters. He received National Integrity Award on 2021. Azim was designated on the Ministry of Foreign Affairs and appointed as the ambassador of Bangladesh to Oman on 2025. In July 2026, he has been appointed as the next chief of the Bangladesh Navy. Azim was promoted from the rank of vice Admiral to Admiral on 23 August 2026. Azim will serve as the Chief of Naval Staff for a period of three years until 22 July 2029.

== Family ==
In his personal life, Azim is married to Mrs. Nurtaz Azim and they have two daughters.
