= List of serving admirals of the Bangladesh Navy =

Ensign of the Bangladesh Navy

This list represents the list of serving admirals of the Bangladesh Navy. Currently the navy has 1 admiral and 18 rear admirals. Historically, the vice admiral was assigned as chief of naval staff (CNS). However, as of 2025, there is no vice admiral. Traditionally, the future CNS is promoted to the rank of vice admiral before assuming the position and is subsequently elevated to admiral.

== Admiral ==
Name	Post	Branch	References
Khondkar Misbah-ul-Azim	Chief of Naval Staff	Executive	

== Vice admirals ==
(No apportion)

== Rear admirals ==
Name	Post	Branch	References
Golam Sadeq	Assistant Chief of Naval Staff (Operations)	Executive	
S. M. Moniruzzaman	Chairman, Chattogram Port Authority	Executive	
Md. Niyamat Elahee	Vice Chancellor of Bangladesh Maritime University	Electrical	
Muhammad Ziaul Hoque	Commander, Chattogram Naval Area	Executive	
A. K. M. Jakir Hossain	Commander, Khulna Naval Area	Executive	
Md Moinul Hassan	Director General, Bangladesh Coast Guard	Executive	
Mushtaque Ahmed	Commander, Bangladesh Navy Fleet	Executive	
Mohammad Maksud Alam	Assistant Chief of Naval Staff (Materials)	Engineering	
Abdullah Al Maksus	Senior Directing Staff (Navy), National Defence College	Executive	
Khandakar Akhter Hossain	Assistant Chief of Naval Staff (Personnel)	Engineering	
Ruhul Minhaz	Area Superintendent Dockyard, Bangladesh Naval Dockyard	Engineering	
Jahangir Adil Samdany	Commandant, Naval Training and Doctrine Command	Executive	
Arif Ahmed Mostafa	Chairman, Mongla Port Authority		
Shafiqur Rahman	Assistant Chief of Naval Staff (Logistics)	Supply	
Md Mustafizur Rahman	Ambassador, Ministry of Foreign Affairs	Executive	
Abdul Latif	Managing Director, Khulna Shipyard Limited	Electrical	
Syed Shaif-ul-Islam	Chairman, Payra Port Authority	Executive	
Mohammad Humayun Kabir	Commander, Dhaka Naval Area	Executive	

== See also ==
- List of serving generals of the Bangladesh Army
- List of serving marshals of the Bangladesh Air Force

== External links and sources ==
- Inter Services Press Release (ISPR) Bangladesh
