= Special Warfare Diving and Salvage =

Bangladesh Navy special operations force

Special Warfare Diving and Salvage (SWADS)
- স্পেশাল ওয়ারফেয়ার ডাইভিং অ্যান্ড স্যালভেজ
- SWADS Insignia
- Active: 2009 - Present (official creation)
- Country: Bangladesh
- Branch: Bangladesh Navy
- Type: Special forces
- Role: Special Operations; Underwater warfare; Salvage; Counterterrorism; Reconnaissance
- Size: Classified
- Part of: Bangladesh special operations forces
- Garrison/HQ: BNS Nirvik, Chittagong
- Nickname: SWADS
- Motto: Valour. Vigour. Victory
- Engagements: Operation Thunderbolt (2016)

Commanders
- Current commander: Commodore Fazlar Rahman

The Special Warfare Diving and Salvage (SWADS) (Bengali: স্পেশাল ওয়ারফেয়ার ডাইভিং অ্যান্ড স্যালভেজ) is an elite special operations unit of Bangladesh Navy. The members of this unit are recruited from the Navy.

As of 2014, SWADS is believed to number a few hundred strong, and is based in the southern port city of Chittagong. Its base is formally known as "BNS Nirvik".

== History ==
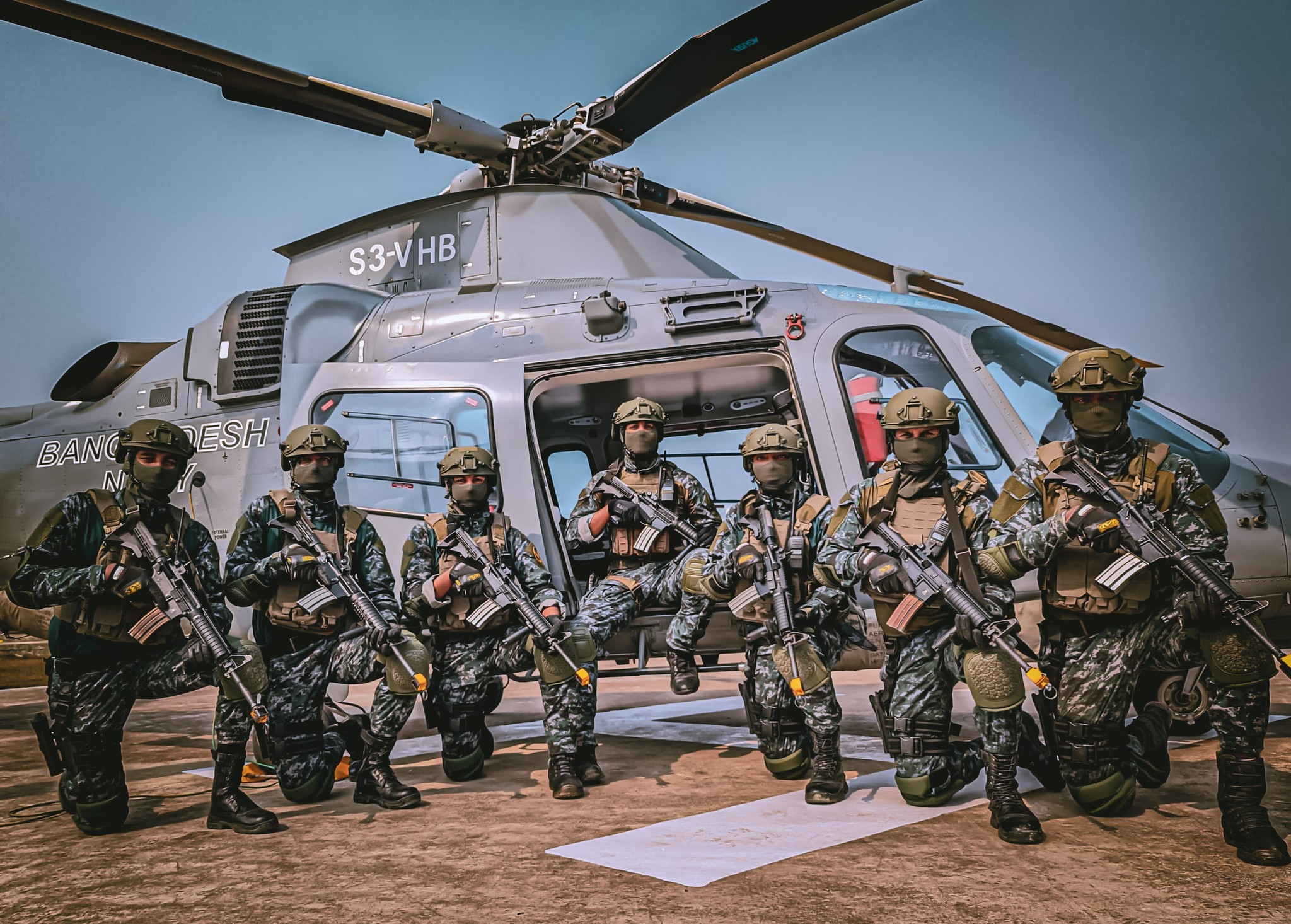
BN SWADS members with a Bangladesh Navy AW-109E Power

Although Bangladeshi Navy personnel were trained on American soil since the 1970s, United States Navy instructors were instrumental in creating SWADS in late 2008. SWADS was formally created in 2009 with 150 commandos and 200 divers recruited. US Ambassador to Bangladesh Dan Mozena assisted in the creation of the unit.

The unit's lineage is traced back to the Nou Commando frogmen of Sector 10 during the country's Liberation War against Pakistan. SWADS operators have participated alongside American Navy SEALs in Joint Combined Training Exchange programs under the Tiger Shark exercises.

== Selection ==
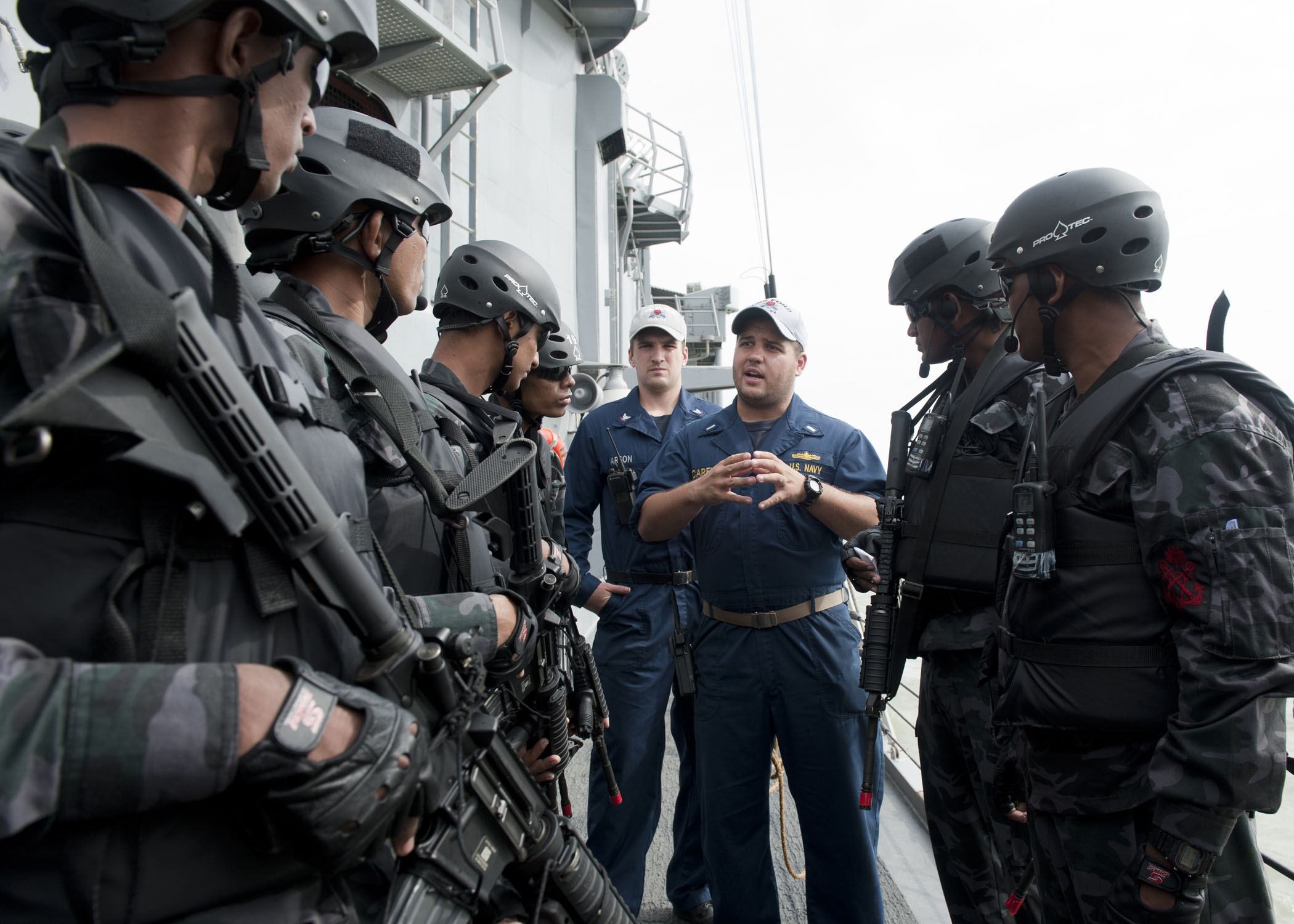
SWADS personnel at a joint military exercise with the US Navy in 2011

SWADS operatives are Navy volunteers trained in Bangladesh and abroad. They complete the Naval Commando Basic Course (similar to BUD/S of the US Navy SEALs) at the SWADS Training area in Rangamati and their airborne qualification course at the army's School of Infantry and Tactics, Sylhet. Further specialist courses are held at various naval and army training bases in Bangladesh and abroad. The average drop rate of NCB is 95%, and this is only the first step of becoming a SWADS operator. SWADS operators receive training from Republic of Korea Navy UDT/SEALs, UK's SAS & SBS, US Marine Force Recon, US Navy SEALS and Turkish SAT. The instructors for this training are often special forces trainers from countries like South Korea, Turkey, and the United States.

The SWADS is organized, trained, and equipped along the lines of SEAL/UDT teams of the United States Navy SEALs and the Republic of Korea Navy UDT/SEAL.

== Duties ==
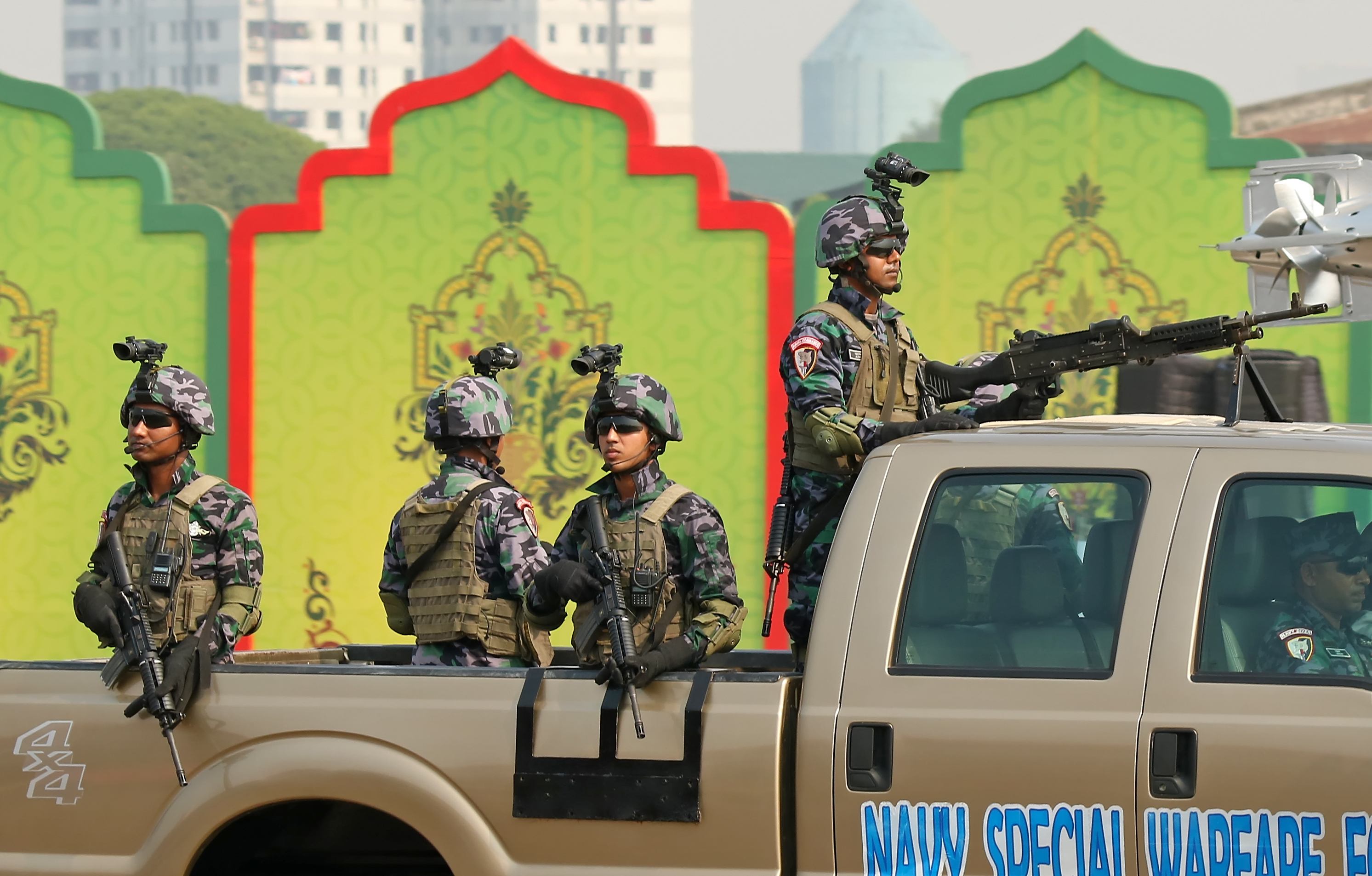
Bangladesh Navy SWADS during victory day parade

SWADS commandos are currently deployed in South Sudan as the Bangladesh Force Marine Unit, part of UNMISS. They were the first SF unit to respond during the Holey Artisan Bakery attack in Dhaka. They later assisted the Army's 1 Para-Commando Battalion in Operation Thunderbolt, by securing the lakeside and cutting off the possible escape route of the terrorists.

SWADS has also performed several Anti-Drug raids in the Bay of Bengal and captured some major drug shipments. They have also conducted Anti-Human Trafficking operations off the coast of Teknaf.

== Weapons and equipment ==
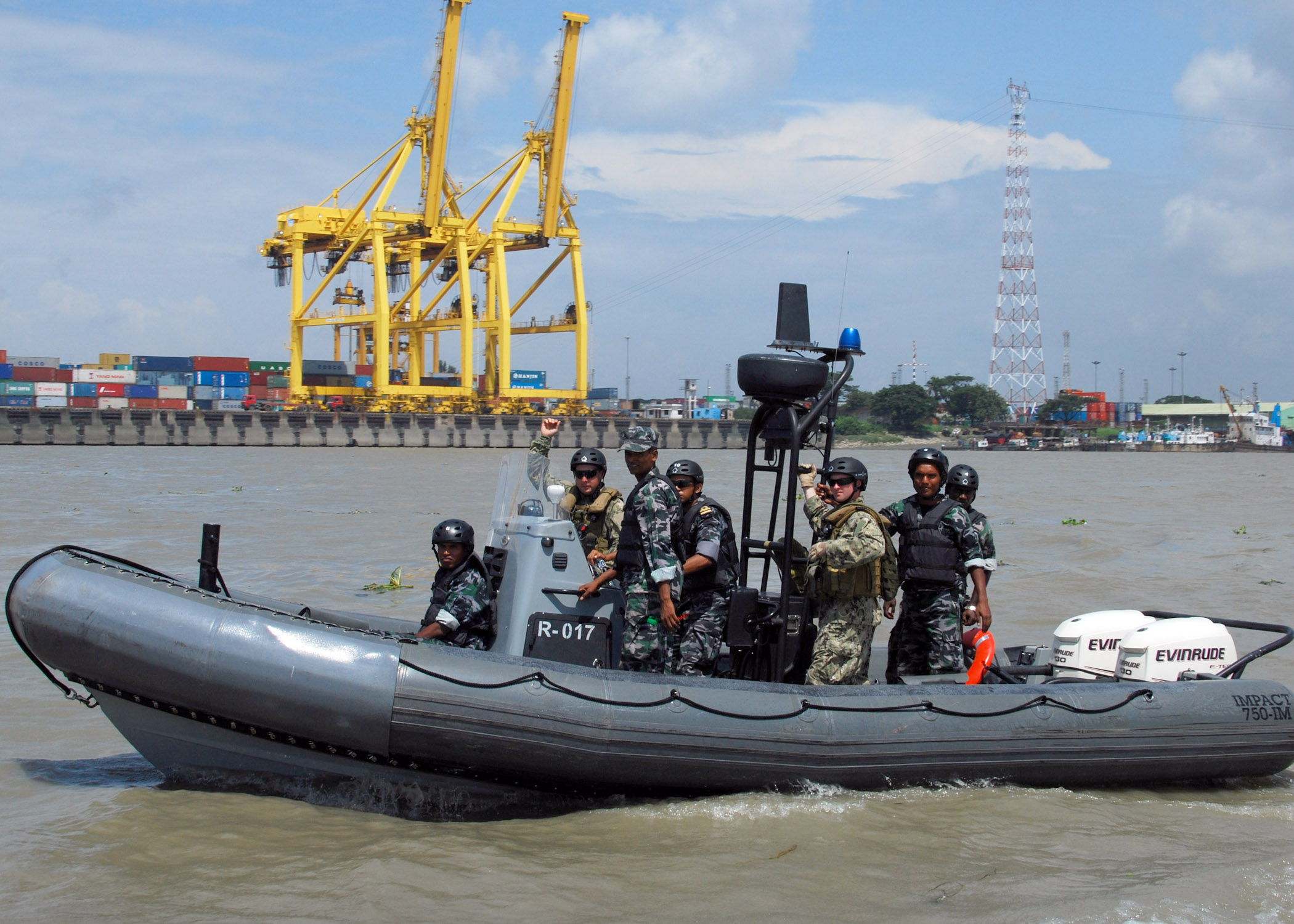
RIVRON 2 and SWADS personnel at a joint military exercise

The range of weapons and equipment used by SWADS members is extensive. In contrast to other Bangladeshi SOF units, a considerable share of SWADS equipment is chambered in western calibers such as 5.56 caliber, owing to the relations with US and ROK SEALs.

SWADS personnel use Level III and Level IIIA bulletproof vests and ballistic helmets as standard issue. SWADS divers use various European diving and hydrographic research equipment.
