= Bangladesh Coast Guard =

Coastal security and paramilitary force of Bangladesh

Bangladesh Coast Guard বাংলাদেশ কোস্ট গার্ড
- Monogram of Bangladesh Coast Guard

- Racing stripe of Bangladesh Coast Guard

- Flag of Bangladesh Coast Guard
- Abbreviation: BCG
- Motto: Guardians of the Seas (Bengali: সমুদ্রের রক্ষক)

Agency overview
- Formed: 14 February 1995; 31 years ago
- Employees: 3,339 personnel
- Annual budget: ৳1125 crore (US$92 million) 2026-2027

Jurisdictional structure
- National agency: Bangladesh
- Operations jurisdiction: Bangladesh
- Governing body: Government of Bangladesh
- Constituting instruments: Coast Guard Act, 1994; Coast Guard Act, 2016 (Act No. 9 of 2016).

Operational structure
- Headquarters: Agargaon, Dhaka, Bangladesh
- Minister responsible: Salahuddin Ahmed, Minister of Home Affairs
- Agency executive: Rear admiral Md Moinul Hassan, Director General
- Parent agency: Ministry of Home Affairs
- Functions: 5: Marine Border Protection; Anti Smuggling Operations; Enforcement Operations; Maritime Operations; Tariff Collection

Facilities
- Boats: 257 vessels

Website
- coastguard.gov.bd

The Bangladesh Coast Guard (Bengali: বাংলাদেশ কোস্ট গার্ড; abbreviated as BCG) is the maritime law enforcement agency of Bangladesh, responsible for safeguarding the country's territorial waters, exclusive economic zone, and coastal resources. Operating under the Ministry of Home Affairs and with operational control by Navy officials, the Coast Guard conducts maritime security, anti-smuggling operations, search and rescue, and environmental protection missions. Established in 1995, the Coast Guard works closely with the Bangladesh Navy and other national agencies to ensure the safety and security of the nation's waterways.

== History ==
The Bangladesh Navy had been performing the duties of a coast guard in addition to its own duties of maritime defence since 1994. As time passed, the growing responsibility and workload became inconvenient for the Bangladesh Navy, with the increasing volume of policing duties at sea taking away from its primary role. The emergence of the Bangladesh Coast Guard was the result of the growing awareness in the government of the requirement of a separate service to enforce national laws in the waters under national jurisdiction and ensure the safety of life and property at sea. Following this, the Coast Guard Act 1994 was passed by the Parliament of Bangladesh in September 1994. Formally, the Bangladesh Coast Guard in its present shape came into being on 14 February 1995 and started operational activities with two patrol craft received from the Bangladesh Navy. The force is under the jurisdiction of the Ministry of Home Affairs.

The Bangladesh Coast Guard motto is 'Guardian at Sea' (Bengali: সমুদ্রের রক্ষক).

The Bangladesh Coast Guard is a force that carries out an array of civil and military responsibilities touching almost every facet of the Bangladesh maritime environment. The headquarters of the Bangladesh Coast Guard is in Agargaon, Sher-e-Bangla Nagar, Dhaka-1207, and four zones (Dhaka, Chittagong, Mongla, and Bhola).

== Role and mission ==
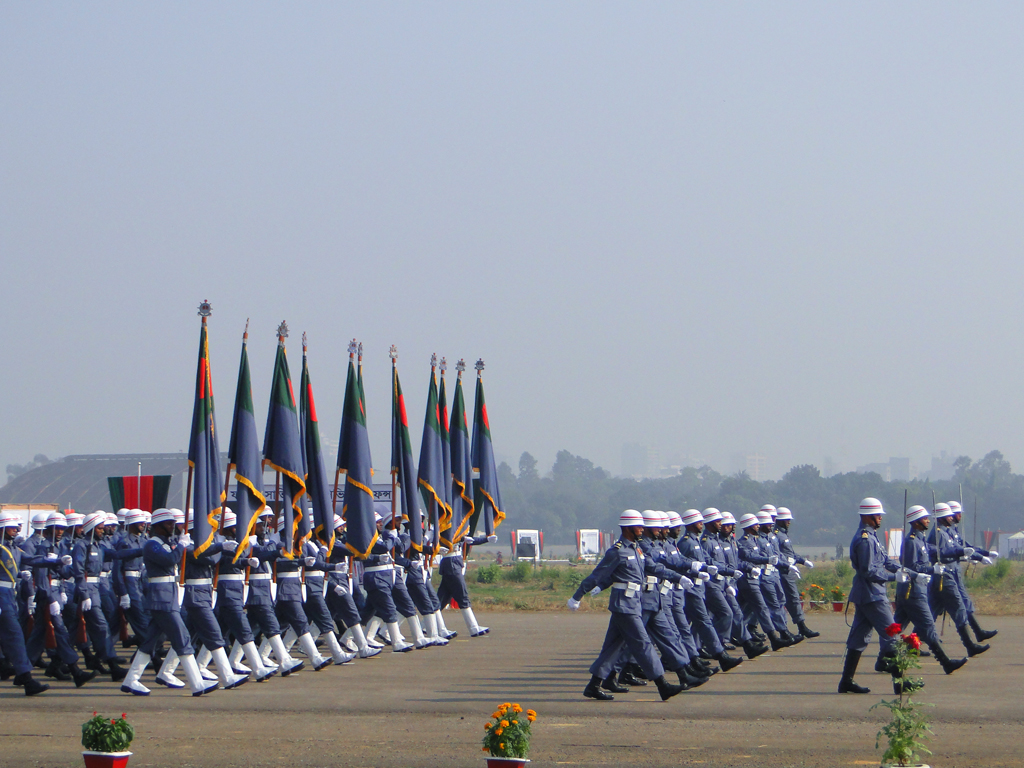
Bangladesh Coast Guard unit marching in Victory Day Parade

Over 90% of Bangladesh's exports and imports pass through two seaports at Chittagong and Mongla. Sea-lines communication to these two seaports are the lifelines of the Bangladeshi economy. UNCLOS 1982 has made provision for sovereign rights for exploration and exploitation of living and non-living resources in the Bangladesh exclusive economic zone. The fishery sector contributes an important part of national export earnings. A significant quantity of gas has been discovered at Sangu in the Bay of Bengal, the extraction of which has already started. Apart from these, a vast number of ships and craft of various types and sizes operate at sea for trade, commerce, fishing, research, exploration, and extraction of oil, gas, and minerals. To exercise effective control, to ensure safety and security, and protect national and international maritime interests at sea, all these diverse activities are brought under various national and international laws and acts.

=== Mission ===
The coast guard's mission is to control piracy, illegal trafficking, and environmental pollution; protect the fishery, oil, gas, and forest resources in Bangladesh waters and coastal areas; ensure overall security and law and order through security assistance to seaports; and conduct relief and rescue operations in the coastal areas during natural calamities.

=== Role ===
==== Primary ====
- Preserve national interest at sea
- Fishery protection
- Prevent illegal immigration through the sea
- Pollution control
- Piracy control
- Prevent smuggling and trafficking of illegal arms, drugs, and narcotics
- Disaster relief operations
- Search and rescue operations
- Preservation of forest
- Surveillance over the sea areas of Bangladesh
- Carry out any other duty assigned by the government

==== Secondary ====
- Assist Bangladesh Navy during war

== Area of jurisdiction ==
The area of jurisdiction of the Bangladesh Coast Guard is the sea territory of Bangladesh as declared under the Territorial and Maritime Zone Act, 1974. The Bangladesh government, being a signatory, has ratified UNCLOS, 1982.

Areas of Jurisdiction in the Bay of Bengal are:

- Internal Waters
- Territorial Water
- Contiguous Zone
- Exclusive Economic Zone
- Continental Shelf

Apart from the sea territory of Bangladesh, the government has also placed the waterways of the mangrove forest of Sundarbans and major rivers up to Dhaka under the jurisdiction of the coast guard.

The Bangladesh Coast Guard has the following zonal commands: Dhaka, East, West, and South zones.

Stations, Outposts, Contingents & Camps	Base	Zone	Stations, Outposts, Contingents & Camps	Base	Zone	Stations, Outposts, Contingents & Camps	Base	Zone	Stations, Outposts, Contingents & Camps	Base	Zone
Teknaf	Iachanagar, Karnaphuli, Chattogram	East	Sharankhola	Digraj, Mongla, Bagerhat	West	Nizampur	Char Kali, Bhola	South	Pagla	Dhaka	Dhaka
Inani	Iachanagar, Karnaphuli, Chattogram	East	Supati	Digraj, Mongla, Bagerhat	West	Patharghata	Char Kali, Bhola	South	Mawa	Dhaka	Dhaka
Saint Martins	Iachanagar, Karnaphuli, Chattogram	East	Koyra	Digraj, Mongla, Bagerhat	West	Patuakhali	Char Kali, Bhola	South	Chandpur	Dhaka	Dhaka
Himchhari	Iachanagar, Karnaphuli, Chattogram	East	Kapilmuni	Digraj, Mongla, Bagerhat	West	Hatia	Char Kali, Bhola	South	Padma Bridge Composit Project	Dhaka	Dhaka
Cox's Bazar	Iachanagar, Karnaphuli, Chattogram	East	Kachikhali	Digraj, Mongla, Bagerhat	West	Lakshmipur	Char Kali, Bhola	South	Haimchar	Dhaka	Dhaka
Matarbari	Iachanagar, Karnaphuli, Chattogram	East	Rupsha	Digraj, Mongla, Bagerhat	West	Nidrasakina	Char Kali, Bhola	South	Gajaria	Dhaka	Dhaka
Kutubdia	Iachanagar, Karnaphuli, Chattogram	East	Dubla	Digraj, Mongla, Bagerhat	West	Barishal	Char Kali, Bhola	South	Nayani	Dhaka	Dhaka
Maheshkhali	Iachanagar, Karnaphuli, Chattogram	East	Koikhali	Digraj, Mongla, Bagerhat	West	Hijla	Char Kali, Bhola	South	Mohanpur	Dhaka	Dhaka
Sangu	Iachanagar, Karnaphuli, Chattogram	East	Dobeki	Digraj, Mongla, Bagerhat	West	Kaliganj	Char Kali, Bhola	South	Paturia	Dhaka	Dhaka
Mirsarai	Iachanagar, Karnaphuli, Chattogram	East	Harbaria	Digraj, Mongla, Bagerhat	West	Andarmanik	Char Kali, Bhola	South	Mill Barrack	Dhaka	Dhaka
Bhatiari	Iachanagar, Karnaphuli, Chattogram	East	Kagadobeki	Digraj, Mongla, Bagerhat	West	Ramgati	Char Kali, Bhola	South		Dhaka	Dhaka
Urir Char	Iachanagar, Karnaphuli, Chattogram	East	Nalian	Digraj, Mongla, Bagerhat	West	Tazumuddin	Char Kali, Bhola	South		Dhaka	Dhaka
Shahpori	Iachanagar, Karnaphuli, Chattogram	East		Digraj, Mongla, Bagerhat	West	Char Manika	Char Kali, Bhola	South		Dhaka	Dhaka
Sandwip	Iachanagar, Karnaphuli, Chattogram	East		Digraj, Mongla, Bagerhat	West	Rangabali	Char Kali, Bhola	South		Dhaka	Dhaka
Patenga	Iachanagar, Karnaphuli, Chattogram	East		Digraj, Mongla, Bagerhat	West	Manpura	Char Kali, Bhola	South		Dhaka	Dhaka
Sarikait	Iachanagar, Karnaphuli, Chattogram	East		Digraj, Mongla, Bagerhat	West		Char Kali, Bhola	South		Dhaka	Dhaka
Baharchhara	Iachanagar, Karnaphuli, Chattogram	East		Digraj, Mongla, Bagerhat	West		Char Kali, Bhola	South		Dhaka	Dhaka
Bhashanchar	Iachanagar, Karnaphuli, Chattogram	East		Digraj, Mongla, Bagerhat	West		Char Kali, Bhola	South		Dhaka	Dhaka
Raypur	Iachanagar, Karnaphuli, Chattogram	East		Digraj, Mongla, Bagerhat	West		Char Kali, Bhola	South		Dhaka	Dhaka
Kamalnagar	Iachanagar, Karnaphuli, Chattogram	East		Digraj, Mongla, Bagerhat	West		Char Kali, Bhola	South		Dhaka	Dhaka

== Command and control ==
=== Headquarters ===
Appointment	Rank and Name
Director General	Rear Admiral Md Moinul Hassan
Deputy Director-General	Commodore Md. Rashed Sattar, (N), NUP, psc, BN
Director (Operations)	Captain Mohammad Saiful Islam, (TAS), afwc, psc, BN
Director (Intelligence)	Captain Al Farooq Mahmud Hossain, (N), NUP, afwc, psc, BN
Director (Personnel)	Captain Al Farooq Mahmud Hossain, (N), NUP, afwc, psc, BN
Director (Engineering)	Captain Riyadh Ibne Jamal, (E), NGP, psc, BN
Director (Logistics)	Captain Mohammad Habibul Billah, (s), psc, BN
Director (IT & Communications)	Captain Mohammad Shahidul Haque, (H1), psc, BN
Director (Planning & Acquisitions)	Captain Md Sohel Azam, (G), NUP, ncc, psc, BN
Judge Advocate General	Commander Abu Sadik Mohammed Shafiq Uddin, (Edn), BCGMS, BN
Chief Inspector and Quality Controller	Commander Md Abu Bakar, (L), PCGMS, BN

=== Zonal commands ===
Appointment	Rank and Name
Zonal Commander (Dhaka Zone)	Commander M Mostafijur Rahman, (ND), BCGM, psc, BN
Zonal Commander (East Zone)	Captain Md Zahirul Haque, (C), BCGMS, psc, BN
Zonal Commander (West Zone)	Captain Mehedi Hasan, (C), nup, psc, BN
Zonal Commander (South Zone)	Captain Mohammed Shahin Mazid, (G), psc, BN

=== Training Base BCG Agrajatra ===
Appointment	Rank and Name
Commandant	Captain Shahjahan Seraj, (G), psc, BN

=== Rank structure ===
Commissioned officers

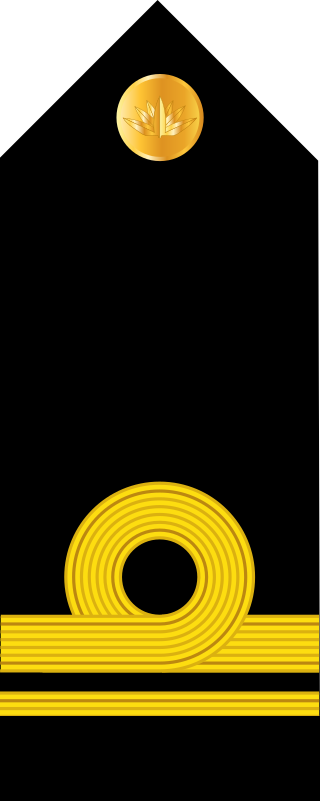
Rank group	General / flag officers		Senior officers			Junior officers
Bangladesh Coast Guard
Bangladesh Coast Guard	রিয়ার এডমিরাল; Riẏāra ēḍamirāla	কমডোর; Kamaḍōra	ক্যাপ্টেন; Kyāpṭēna	কমান্ডার; Kamānḍāra	লেফটেন্যান্ট কমান্ডার; Lēphaṭēn'yānṭa kamānḍāra	লেফটেন্যান্ট; Lēphaṭēn'yānṭa	সাব লেফটেন্যান্ট; Sāba lēphaṭēn'yānṭa	Acting Sub-lieutenant	Midshipman	Officer Cadet

Other ranks

Rank group	Subordinate Officers (SO)			Non commissioned officers (NCO)			Enlisted
Bangladesh Coast Guard						No insignia	No insignia
Bangladesh Coast Guard	মাস্টার চীফ পেটি অফিসার; Māsṭāra cīpha pēṭi aphisāra	সিনিয়র চীফ পেটি অফিসার; Siniẏara cīpha pēṭi aphisāra	চীফ পেটি অফিসার; Cīpha pēṭi aphisāra	পেটি অফিসার; Pēṭi aphisāra	লিডিং সীম্যান; Liḍiṁ sīmyāna	এ্যাবল সীম্যান; Ēyābala sīmyāna	অরডিনারী সীম্যান; Araḍinārī sīmyāna

=== Medals ===
- Bangladesh Coast Guard Padak (Bravery)
- President Coast Guard Padak (Bravery)
- Bangladesh Coast Guard Padak (Service)
- President Coast Guard Padak (Service)

== List of directors general ==
No	Name	Took office	Left office
1	Commodore Shafiq-ur-Rahman, (N), ncc, psc, BN	14 February 1995	6 August 1998
2	Captain M A Motalib, (G), ndu, psc, BN	7 August 1998	28 April 1999
3	Commodore M Shahabuddin, (E), psc, BN	29 April 1999	29 January 2002
4	Commodore Shah Iqbal Mujtaba, (D), ndc, psc, BN	30 January 2002	29 May 2002
5	Captain S M H Kabir, ndu, psc, BN	30 May 2002	5 March 2005
6	Rear Admiral Sarwar Jahan Nijam, (C), ndu, psc, BN Birth: 2/11/1952 - Death: 10/10/2025	6 March 2005	8 February 2007
7	Commodore M A K Azad, (G), ndc, psc, BN	8 February 2007	5 January 2008
8	Commodore Moqsum Ul Kader (C) ndc, afwc, psc, BN	6 January 2008	25 January 2009
9	Rear Admiral Z U Ahmed, NBP, BCGM, ndc, psc, BN	26 January 2009	27 January 2009
10	Commodore Moqsum Ul Kader, (C), ndc, afwc, psc, BN	28 January 2009	23 March 2009
11	Commodore A. S. M. A. Abedin, ndc, psc, BN	23 March 2009	31 March 2011
12	Rear Admiral Kazi Sarwar Hossain, (TAS), (CD), ncc, psc, BN	1 April 2011	16 December 2013
13	Rear Admiral M Makbul Hossain, NBP, OSP, BCGMS, ndu, psc, BN	4 December 2013	15 February 2016
14	Rear Admiral Aurangzeb Chowdhury, (G), NBP, OSP, BCGM, PCGM, BCGMS, ndc, psc, BN	16 February 2016	26 January 2019
15	Rear Admiral M Ashraful Haq, (C), NUP, ndc, afwc, psc, BN	10 February 2019	24 August 2021
16	Rear Admiral Ashraful Hoq Chowdhury, (G), ndu, afwc, psc, BCGM, BN	24 August 2021	30 January 2024
17	Rear Admiral Mir Ershad Ali, OSP, NPP	30 January 2024	31 October 2024
18	Rear Admiral Muhammad Ziaul Hoque, OSP	31 October 2024	10 September 2026
19	Rear Admiral Md Moinul Hassan NBP, BSP, BCGM, ndc, ncc, psc	10 September 2026	Present

== Ships ==
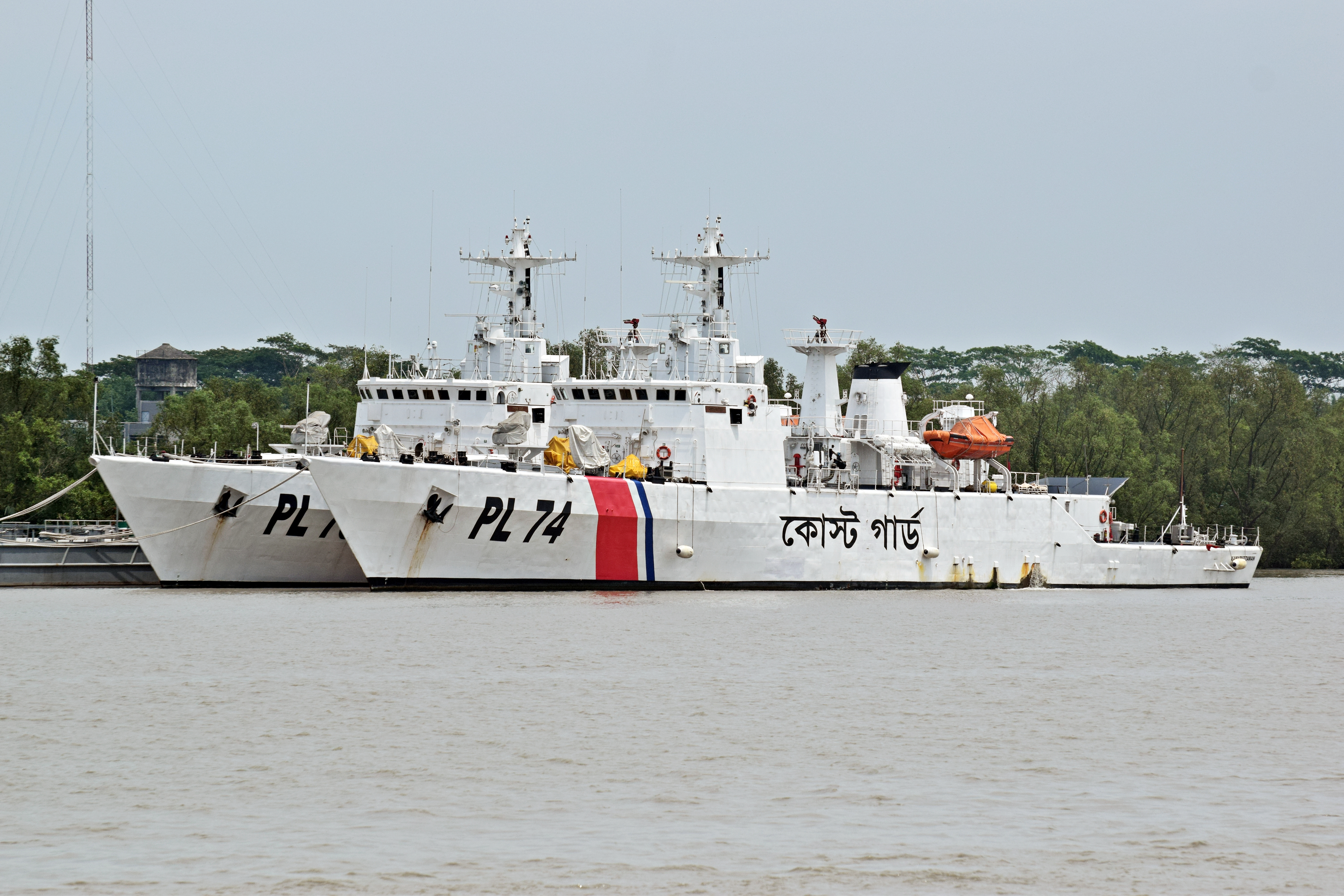
Leader-class offshore patrol vessel, built in Italy

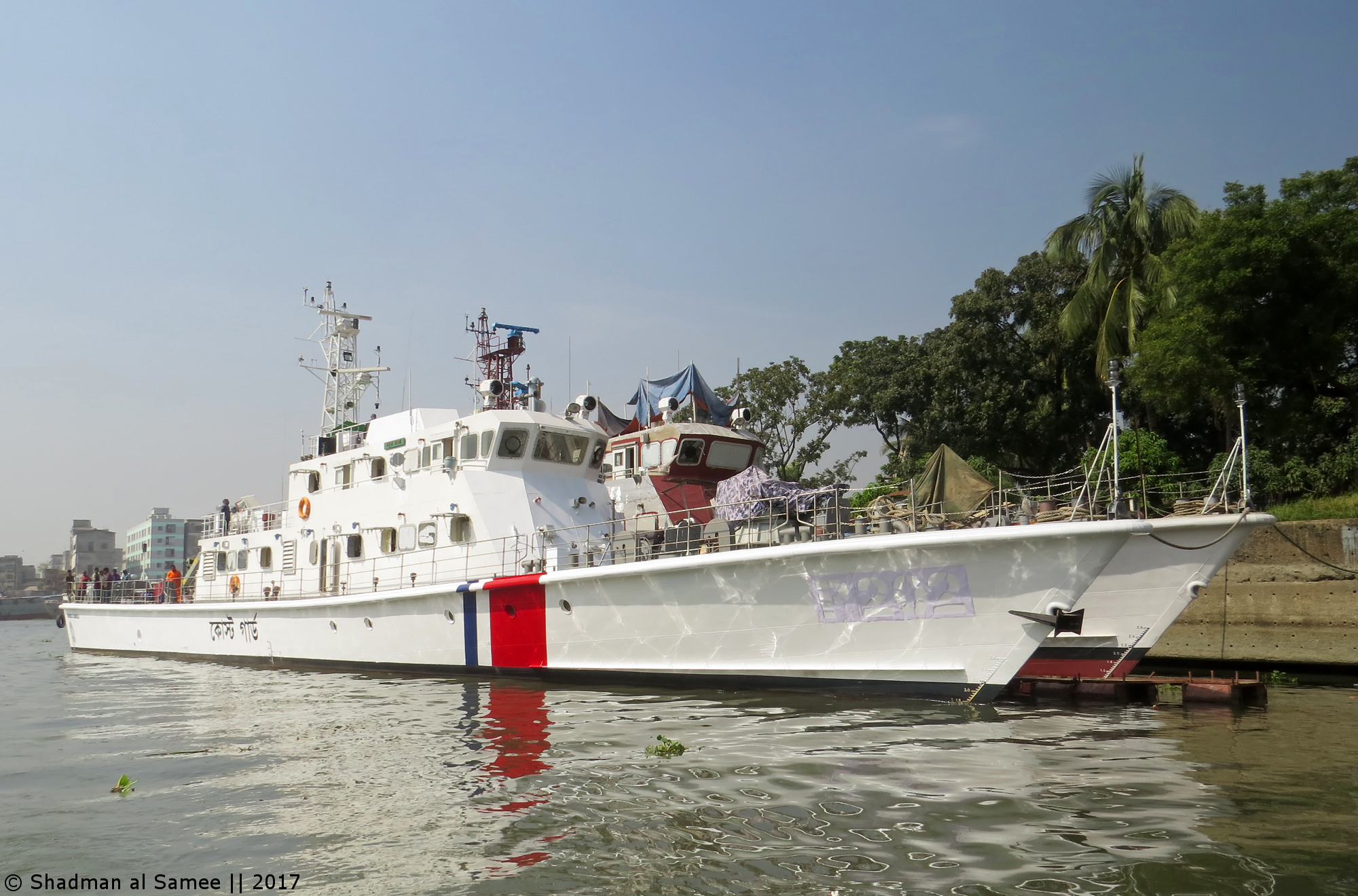
Sobuj Bangla-class patrol craft, built by DEW, Narayanganj, Bangladesh.

Type	Quantity	Note
Offshore patrol vessel	4	
Inshore patrol vessel	8	
Fast attack craft (gun)	4	
Coastal patrol craft	4	
Riverine patrol craft	5	
Harbour patrol boat	6	
High speed patrol boat	136	

== Future modernization plan ==
The Bangladesh Government has started a massive modernization plan named Coast Guard Goal 2030 to make Coast Guard a well-trained and well-equipped force to ensure the security of the coastal area. The expansion of the force manpower is also included in the plan.

Dockyard and Engineering Works Limited is constructing two inshore patrol vessels (IPV) for the Bangladesh Coast Guard. These vessels will be 52.8 meters (173 ft 3 in) long, 7.4 m (24 ft 3 in) wide and have a draft of 4.5 m (14 ft 9 in) with a displacement of 315 metric tons (310 long tons).

The coast guard ordered six X12 high-speed boats which are being built at Dockyard and Engineering Works Limited with technical assistance from Indonesia. These ships are made of carbon composite and have a length of 11.7 metres (38 ft 5 in) and a speed of 35 knots (65 km/h; 40 mph).
