= Bangladesh Naval Academy =

Officer Cadets Training Institution of the Bangladesh Navy

- বাংলাদেশ নেভাল একাডেমি
- Coat of arms of BNA
- Motto: আল্লাহর পথে যুদ্ধ কর
- Motto in English: Fight in the way of Allah
- Type: Naval academy
- Established: 1976; 50 years ago
- Affiliations: MIST
- Commandant: Commodore Tanzim Faruq, (ND), NGP, ndu, psc, BN
- Academic staff: 100-150 (military & civilian)
- Undergraduates: 250-350
- Location: Patenga, Chittagong District, Bangladesh
- Campus: Port
- Colours: White and Blue
- Website: bna.navy.mil.bd

The Bangladesh Naval Academy is a military academy for the officer cadets of Bangladesh Navy. It is situated at the mouth of the Karnaphuli river at Patenga, Chittagong District, Bangladesh.

== History ==
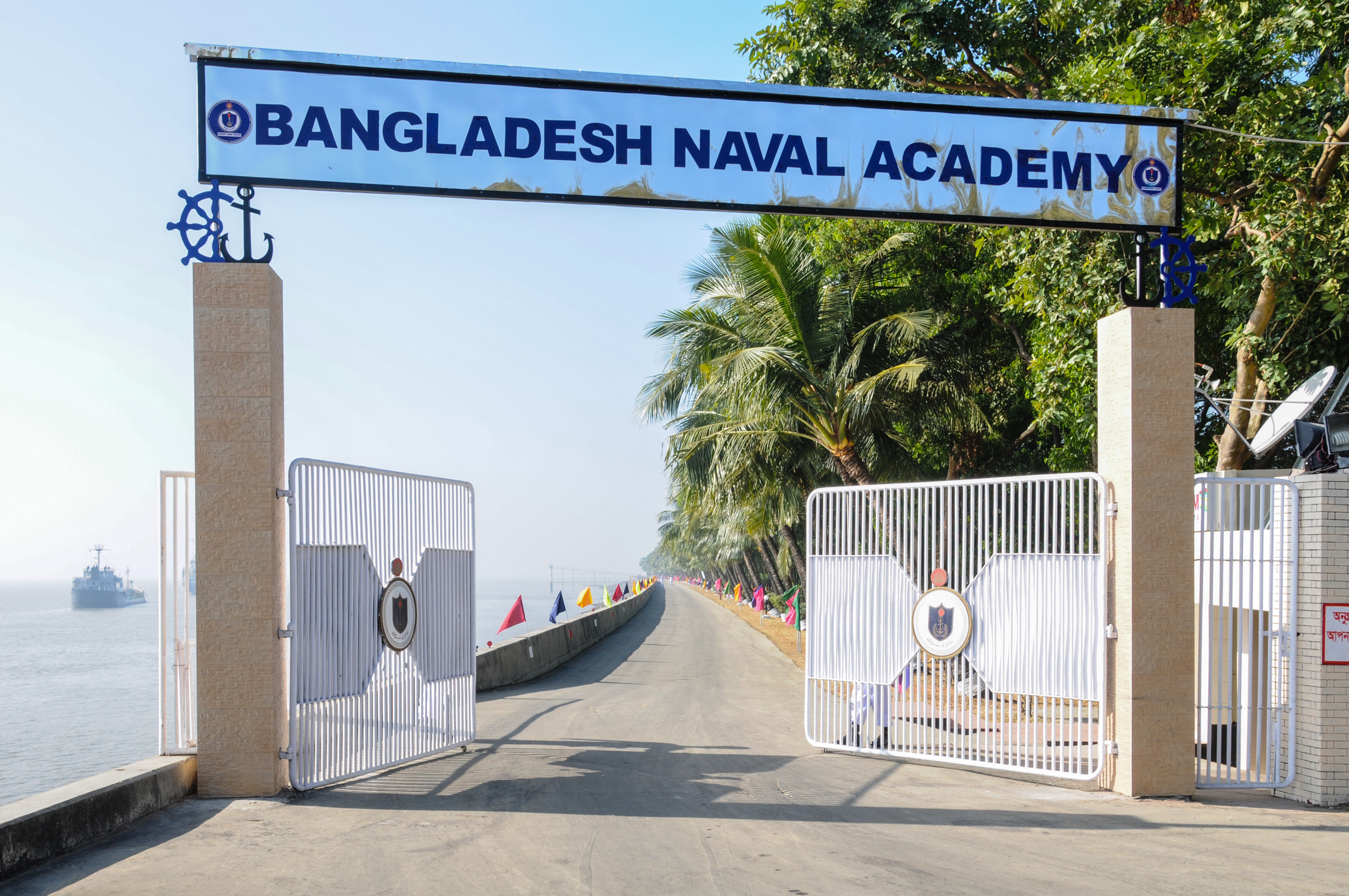
Bangladesh Naval Academy main entrance.

Bangladesh Naval Academy is a reputed military academy for naval training in South Asia. It was established in 1976 at the premises of the Mercantile Marine Academy at Juludia, Chittagong, later shifted to BNS Issa Khan in Chittagong to train the cadets of the Bangladesh Navy. The academy shifted to its present location in 1988. Yuri V Redkin, a Soviet Union navy sailor who died clearing mines left from the Bangladesh Liberation War in Chittagong port, is buried here. The military academy was opened by the initiative of the then Prime Minister Sheikh Mujibur Rahman. The academy was officially commissioned on 2 June 1988 and started functioning independently at the picturesque site of Patenga just at the river mouth of Karnaphuli. Inspired by its motto 'Fight in the way of Allah', Bangladesh Naval Academy has been making commendable contributions to Bangladesh's national life by training its own and overseas naval officers during the last 3 decades. In July 1998, the first batch of overseas cadets joined Bangladesh Naval Academy. Till 2018, more than 100 foreign cadets from friendly countries like Palestine, Maldives and Qatar got commission from this academy. Bangladesh Naval Academy is the pioneer institution in inducting female cadets in the armed forces. In January 2000, the first batch of 16 female cadets joined Bangladesh Naval Academy for cadet training. So far, more than 110 female officers have been commissioned from this academy. In recognition of outstanding achievements over the past decades, Bangladesh Naval Academy was awarded the National Standard on 28 December 2003 by the Prime Minister of Bangladesh.

== Training ==
All cadets of the Bangladesh Navy undergo 10 weeks of joint services training in Bangladesh Military Academy with the Army and Air Force cadets. In the Bangladesh Naval Academy, they continue training for another 15 months till they become Midshipmen. The Midshipmen are sent to ships for 6 months of sea training. After sea training i.e. after 3 years of training they are commissioned in the Bangladesh Navy in the rank of Sub Lieutenant. Officers are also awarded the Bachelor of Science degree as they graduate from the academy with the affiliation of Bangladesh University of Professionals (Bangladesh). In 2014, the academy has introduced 4 years BSc(Hons) in Maritime Science and BBA in Logistics and Management under Bangladesh University of Professionals.

Many foreign cadets from Palestine, Sri Lanka, Maldives and Qatar are trained in Bangladesh Naval Academy. There are four wings in the academy namely- professional wing, academic wing, training, and administrative wing. Junior Staff Course (JSC) is also conducted at Bangladesh Naval Academy under JSC Wing.

Presently, Commodore A K M Afzal Hossain, (C), OSP, afwc, psc, BN is the Commandant of the Bangladesh Naval Academy.

== Training course ==
The training courses run at Bangladesh Naval Academy are as follow:

- Long Course – 3 years.
- Direct Entry Officer Course – 24 weeks.
- Junior Staff Course - 12 weeks
- Branch Rank Common Course

== Training criteria ==
One of the premiere training institutes of Bangladesh, Bangladesh Naval Academy deals with the immense task of fulfilling national policy and committed for developing commissioned officers to lead the future Bangladesh Navy. Primarily, Bangladesh Naval Academy training has four dimensions:

- Leadership: To impart all the qualities to be a good leader .
- Physical Training: To attain the military standard of physical fitness.
- Naval Training: It facilities naval training which includes Seamanship Model Room, Chart Room, Sailing and Pulling, NBCD simulator, Planetarium for Astro Navigation etc.
- Academics: Academic training facilities include physics lab, Language lab, Computer lab, Library etc. Bangladesh Naval Academy also conducts basic Computer Course, Branch Rank Common Course, Language Course and Junior Staff Course for BN and overseas officers.

== Club activities and facilities ==
Sailing and Pulling facilities

To be habituated with the naval life it provides sailing and pulling facilities

Computer Club

This club works on enhancing cadets about computer knowledge. Make them confident about handling of computer.

Language Club

This club works on increasing the efficiency of cadets on different languages for speaking and writing.

Library

This library contains various kind of book to enrich cadets knowledge.

Recreation

Adequate sports and other recreational facilities including golf are available.

Medical facilities

First aid centre with qualified doctors is available within the campus. Combined Military Hospital, BNS PATENGA is only a few kilometers from the academy.

Accommodation

Well-furnished gun room for cadets and under training officers.

== Division ==
The academy divided into three division based on the parts of warship:

- Main Top
- Quarter Deck
- Fox'l

== See also ==
- Bangladesh Marine Academy
- Bangladesh Marine Fisheries Academy
- Bangladesh Military Academy
- Bangladesh Air Force Academy
