= Awards and decorations of the Bangladesh Armed Forces =

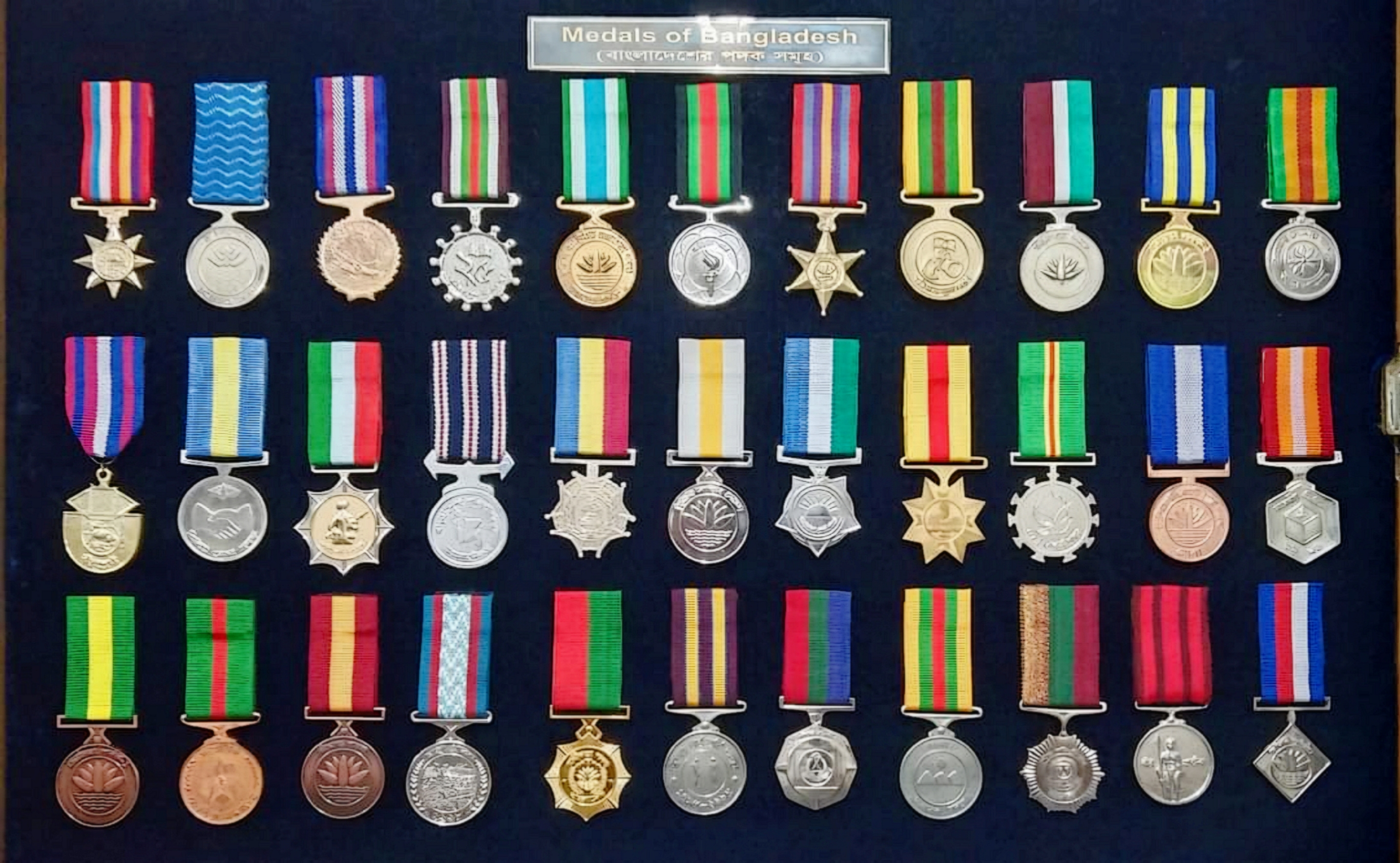
Medals of Bangladesh

The Bangladesh award medals and their associated ribbon bars in recognition of various levels of service, personal accomplishments and commemorative events while a regular serviceperson/person is a civilian citizen or a member of the Bangladesh Army, Bangladesh Navy, Bangladesh Air Force, Border Guard Bangladesh, Bangladesh Coast Guard, Bangladesh Police, Bangladesh Ansar & VDP and Bangladesh Fire Service & Civil Defence. Together with service badges, such awards are a means to outwardly display the highlights of a serviceperson's/person's career.

== Civilian awards ==
Name	Ribbon	Medal (Front)	Medal (Back)
Swadhinata Padak			
Ekushey Padak			

== Gallantry awards ==
=== Wartime gallantry awards ===
Name	Ribbon	Medal (Front)	Medal (Back)
Bir Sreshtho (BS) (The Most Valiant Hero)			
Bir Uttom (BU) (Great Valiant Hero)			
Bir Bikrom (BB) (Valiant Hero)			
Bir Protik (BP) (Symbol of Bravery)			

=== Peacetime gallantry awards ===
Name	Image	Description
Bir Sorbottam		Bir Sorbottam (Bengali: বীর সর্বোত্তম; literally, "The Foremost Braves"), the highest gallantry award
Bir Mrittunjoee		Bir Mrittunjoee (Bengali: বীর মৃত্যুঞ্জয়ী; literally, "The Immortal Braves"), the second highest gallantry award
Bir Chiranjib		Bir Chiranjib (Bengali: বীর চিরঞ্জীব; literally, " The Incorruptible Braves"), the third highest gallantry award
Bir Durjoy		Bir Durjoy (Bengali: বীর দুর্জয়; literally, "The Indomitable Braves"), the fourth highest gallantry award

== Liberation War medals ==
Name	Ribbon	Image (Front)	Image (Back)	Description
Samar Padak				Somor Padak (Bengali: সমর পদক) is intended to be awarded to members of the armed forces participating in the war of independence against Pakistan.
Joy Padak				Joy Padak (Bengali: জয় পদক) is awarded for victory in the 1971 War of Independence. It is intended to be awarded to members of the armed forces participating in the war of independence against Pakistan members of the armed forces participating in the war of independence against Pakistan.
Rono Taroka				Rono Taroka (Bengali: রণ তারকা) was establishRono Taroka\t\t\t\tRono Taroka (Bengali: রণ তারকা) was established on December 15, 1973. The medal is intended for awarding participants in the War of Independence. The Bangladesh War of Independence was an armed conflict between West Pakistan, East Pakistan (i.e., between Pakistan and Bangladesh, which were at that time two parts of the same country) and India, as a result of which East Pakistan became the independent country of Bangladesh.[1][4]ed on December 15, 1973. The medal is intended for awarding participants in the War of Independence. The Bangladesh War of Independence was an armed conflict between West Pakistan, East Pakistan (i.e., between Pakistan and Bangladesh, which were at that time two parts of the same country) and India, as a result of which East Pakistan became the independent country of Bangladesh.
Mukti Taroka				Mukti Taroka (Bengali: মুক্তি তারকা) was established on December 15, 1973. The medal is intended for awarding participants in the War of Independence. The Bangladesh War of Independence was an armed conflict between West Pakistan, East Pakistan (i.e., between Pakistan and Bangladesh, which were at that time two parts of the same country) and India, as a result of which East Pakistan became the independent country of Bangladesh.
Songbidhan Padak				Songbidhan Padak (Bengali: সংবিধান পদক) was established in honor of the adoption of the constitution on November 4, 1972. This is a medal of the constitution. Commemorating the proclamation of the Bangladeshi constitution

== Service and campaign medals ==
=== Army service medals ===
Name	Ribbon	Image (Front)	Image (Back)	Description
Senabahini Padak (SBP)				Army Medal (Bengali: সেনাবাহিনী পদক) is the highest Bangladesh Army peace time award given by the Government of Bangladesh. It is awarded to any member of Bangladesh Army for exemplary devotion/self-sacrifice/sincerity/obedience/bravery or performance of significant dutifulness for the country or for courageous activity in special risky land operations.
Osamanno Seba Padak (OSP)				Extraordinary Service Medal (Bengali: অসামান্য সেবা পদক) is the Bangladesh Armed Forces peace time award. This medal is awarded to any member of Bangladesh Armed Forces who displays admiring contribution and daring acts of bravery to counter immediate situations at land operations or exceptional/sincerity efficient management/humanitarian assistance for the significant development of the armed forces or country.
Bisisto Seba Padak (BSP)				Distinguished Service Medal (Bengali: বিশিষ্ট সেবা পদক) is another peace time award of the Bangladesh Armed Forces. This medal is awarded to any member of the Bangladesh Armed Forces who have performed an act of significant contribution or controlling critical situations in the armed forces or the country or those who displayed a praiseworthy initiative for the development of Bangladesh and its military.
Sena Gourab Padak (SGP)				Army Medal of Glory (Bengali: সেনা গৌরব পদক) is a peace time award of Bangladesh Army. This medal is awarded to any member of Bangladesh Army who have completed mentionable land service and displayed exemplary conduct/efficiency/boldness in establishing himself as an extraordinary person to inspire others.
Sena Utkorsho Padak (SUP)				Army Medal of Excellence (Bengali: সেনা উৎকর্ষ পদক) is a peace time award of the Bangladesh Army. This medal is awarded to any member of Bangladesh Army who has performed acts of significant contribution in risky situations and praiseworthy initiatives in original research and successful completion of any project in home and abroad or commendable success which inspires others.
Sena Parodorshita Padak (SPP)				Army Efficiency Medal (Bengali: সেনা পারদর্শিতা পদক) is the Bangladesh Army peacetime award. This is awarded to any member of the Bangladesh Army who has achieved special success in the individual arena, and for significant initiatives in publishing successful research-related work on professional subjects, and those who have also achieved success in home and foreign training or army exercises and combined exercises or contribution in initial plannings and executions of exercises which encourages others.

=== Navy service medals ===
Name	Ribbon	Image (Front)	Image (Back)	Description
Noubahini Padak (NBP)				Navy Medal (Bengali: নৌবাহিনী পদক) is the highest Bangladesh Navy peace time award given by the Government of Bangladesh. It is awarded to any member of Bangladesh Navy for exemplary devotion/self-sacrifice/sincerity/obedience/bravery or performance of significant dutifulness for the country or for courageous activity in special risky land operations.
Osamanno Seba Padak (OSP)				Extraordinary Service Medal (Bengali: অসামান্য সেবা পদক) is the Bangladesh Armed Forces peace time award. This medal is awarded to any member of Bangladesh Armed Forces who displays admiring contribution and daring acts of bravery to counter immediate situations at land operations or exceptional/sincerity efficient management/humanitarian assistance for the significant development of the armed forces or country.
Bisisto Seba Padak (BSP)				Distinguished Service Medal (Bengali: বিশিষ্ট সেবা পদক) is another peace time award of the Bangladesh Armed Forces. This medal is awarded to any member of the Bangladesh Armed Forces who have performed an act of significant contribution or controlling critical situations in the armed forces or the country or those who displayed a praiseworthy initiative for the development of Bangladesh and its military.
Nou Gourob Padak (NGP)				Navy Medal of Glory (Bengali: নৌ গৌরব পদক) is a peace time award of Bangladesh Navy. This medal is awarded to any member of Bangladesh Navy who have completed mentionable land service and displayed exemplary conduct/efficiency/boldness in establishing himself as an extraordinary person to inspire others.
Nou Utkorsho Padak (NUP)				Navy Medal of Excellence (Bengali: নৌ উৎকর্ষ পদক) is a peace time award of the Bangladesh Navy. This medal is awarded to any member of Bangladesh Navy who have performed acts of significant contribution in risky situations and praiseworthy initiatives in original research and successful completion of any project in home and abroad or commendable success which inspired others.
Nou Parodorsita Padak (NPP)				Navy Effeciency Medal (Bengali: নৌ পারদর্শিতা পদক) is the Bangladesh Navy peace time award. This medal is awarded to any member of the Bangladesh Navy who has achieved special success in the individual arena, and for significant initiatives in publishing successful research-related work on professional subjects, and those who have also achieved success in home and foreign training or army exercises and combined exercises or contribution in initial plannings and executions of exercises which encourages others.

=== Air Force service medals ===
Name	Ribbon	Image (Front)	Image (Back)	Description
Biman Bahini Padak (BBP)				Air Force Medal (Bengali: বিমান বাহিনী পদক) is the highest Bangladesh Air Force peacetime award given by the Government of Bangladesh. It is awarded to any member of Bangladesh Air Force for exemplary devotion/self-sacrifice/sincerity/obedience/bravery or performance of significant dutifulness for the country or for courageous activity in special risky land operations.
Osamanno Seba Padak (OSP)				Extraordinary Service Medal (Bengali: অসামান্য সেবা পদক) is the Bangladesh Armed Forces peace time award. This medal is awarded to any member of Bangladesh Armed Forces who displays admiring contribution and daring acts of bravery to counter immediate situations at land operations or exceptional/sincerity efficient management/humanitarian assistance for the significant development of the armed forces or country.
Bisisto Seba Padak (BSP)				Distinguished Service Medal (Bengali: বিশিষ্ট সেবা পদক) is another peace time award of the Bangladesh Armed Forces. This medal is awarded to any member of the Bangladesh Armed Forces who have performed an act of significant contribution or controlling critical situations in the armed forces or the country or those who displayed a praiseworthy initiative for the development of Bangladesh and its military.
Gourobujjol Uddoyon Padak (GUP)				Distinguished Flying Medal (Bengali: গৌরবোজ্জ্বল উড্ডয়ন পদক) is a peace time award of Bangladesh Air Force. This medal is awarded to any member of Bangladesh Air Force who have completed mentionable land service and displayed exemplary conduct/efficiency/boldness in establishing himself as an extraordinary person to inspire others.
Biman Utkorsho Padak (BUP)				Air Force Medal of Excellence (Bengali: বিমান উৎকর্ষ পদক) is a peace time award of the Bangladesh Air Force. This medal is awarded to any member of Bangladesh Air Force who have performed acts of significant contribution in risky situations and praiseworthy initiatives in original research and successful completion of any project in home and abroad or commendable success which inspired others.
Biman Parodorsita Padak (BPP)				Air Force Effeciency Medal (Bengali: বিমান পারদর্শিতা পদক) is the Bangladesh Air Force peace time award. This medal is awarded to any member of Bangladesh Air Force who has achieved special success in the individual arena and for significant initiatives in publishing successful research-related work on professional subjects and those who have also achieved success in home and foreign training or army exercises and combined exercises or contribution in initial plannings and executions of exercises which encouraged others.

=== Campaign & operation medals ===
Name	Ribbon	Image (Front)	Image (Back)	Description
Dabanal Padak				Dabanal Padak (Bengali: দাবানল পদক) is intended to reward servicemen who took part in the campaign in the Chittagong Hill Tracts. The Chittagong Hill Tracts is a territory in southeastern Bangladesh on the border with India and Myanmar, a mountainous region in the country.
Uttoron Padak				Uttaran Padak (Bengali: উত্তরণ পদক) is intended to reward servicemen who took part in the campaign in the Chittagong Hill Tracts. The "Operation Dabanal" (Operation Wildfire) was replaced by "Operation Uttaran" (Operation Upliftment) by which the Bangladesh military went to solve the CHT crisis militarily through imposing military maneuvers superseding the local civil administration.
Nirapattya Padak				Nirapattya Padak (Bengali: নিরাপত্তা পদক) is awarded for those who contributed to the internal security of Bangladesh.
Operation Naf Padak				Operation Naf Padak was awarded to every member of Bangladesh Rifles who participated in the operation. The Naf War Medal is one of the most important combat medals in Bangladesh's history, awarded to the Bangladesh Rifles in the wake of the Naf War of 2001. The Naf War killed about 600 Myanmar soldiers, but Bangladesh suffered no casualties. It was the largest border war in Bangladesh since independence.
Operation Kuwait Punorgothon				This medal was instituted in 1991 and awarded to members of the Bangladesh Armed Forces who participated in the operation to rebuild Kuwait after the gulf war. *The 1st type of this medal was replaced by the 2nd type (Replacement year unknown).
Operation Purbo Prachir Padak				Operation Purbo Prachir Padak (Operation Eastern Wall medal), awarded to individuals for participating in counter-terrorism operations in the southeastern mountainous areas.

=== Service medals ===
Name	Ribbon	Image (Front)	Image (Back)	Description
Plaban 1988 Padak				Plaban 1988 Padak (Bengali: প্লাবন ১৯৮৮ পদক) is intended for awarding servicemen who took part in the liquidation of the consequences of the flood of 1988.
Ghurnijhar 1991 Padak				Ghurnijhar 1991 Padak (Bengali: ঘূর্ণিঝড় ১৯৯১ পদক) is intended for awarding servicemen who took part in the liquidation of the consequences of the cyclone in 1991.
Mahaplaban Padak 1998				Mahaplaban Padak 1998 (Bengali: মহাপ্লাবন পদক ১৯৯৮) is intended for awarding servicemen who took part in the liquidation of the consequences of the flood in 1998.
Songsodio Nirbachan 1991				Songsodio Nirbachon 1991 (Bengali: সংসদীয় নির্বাচন ১৯৯১) is intended for awarding those who played a key role in the 1991 Bangladeshi general election and later, a medal with a similar design was established in 1996 and 2001.
Songsodio Nirbachan 1996				Songsodio Nirbachon 1996 (Bengali: সংসদীয় নির্বাচন ১৯৯৬) is intended for awarding those who played a key role in the 1991 Bangladeshi general election.
Songsodio Nirbachan 2001				Songsodio Nirbachon 2001 (Bengali: সংসদীয় নির্বাচন ২০০১) is intended for awarding those who took part in establishing fair and free environments during the 2001 Bangladeshi general election.
Silver Jubilee Medal				Silver Jubilee Medal (Bengali: রজত জয়ন্তী পদক) was established in 1996 in honor of the 25th anniversary of the proclamation of independence.
Birth Centenary Medal of Mujib				This medal was established in honor of the 100th birth anniversary of Sheikh Mujibur Rahman.
Golden Jubilee Medal				The Golden Jubilee Medal was established in 2021 in honor of the 50th anniversary of the proclamation of independence.
Golden Jubilee Medal of The East Bengal Regiment				Golden Jubilee Medal (Bengali: সুবর্ণ জয়ন্তী পদক) was established in 1998 in honor of the 50th anniversary of the creation of the East Bengal Regiment. At the moment, the East Bengal Regiment consists of 50 battalions and plays a key role in ensuring the sovereignty of the independent state of Bangladesh.
Platinum Jubilee Medal of The East Bengal Regiment				The Platinum Jubilee Medal of The East Bengal Regiment was established in honor of the 75th anniversary of the creation of Regiment.
Disoto Borsho Purti Padak				Bi-Centennial Padak (Bengali: দ্বিশত বর্ষপূর্তি পদক) was established in 1995 in honor of the 200th anniversary of the creation of the Bangladesh Rifles.
Songsodio Nirbachan 2008				This medal is awarded to individuals who played a key role in the 2008 election.
Songsodio Nirbachan 2014				This medal is awarded to individuals who played a key role in the 2014 election.
Songsodio Nirbachan 2018				This medal is awarded to individuals who played a key role in the 2018 election.
Songsodio Nirbachan 2024				This medal is awarded to individuals who played a key role in the 2024 election.

=== Long service awards ===
Name	Ribbon	Image (Front)	Image (Back)	Description
Jesthata Padak III				All members of the armed forces receive the Jesthata-3 Medal, awarded in recognition of 27 years or more of outstanding military service. Issued since 1983, it was the only military medal made in sterling silver, although silver has since been discontinued.
Jesthata Padak II				Jesthata Padak II (Bengali: জ্যেষ্ঠতা পদক ২) is intended for awarding members of the armed forces for 20 years or more of impeccable service. JP-2 conferrable on completion of 20 yrs unblemished service career
Jesthata Padak I				Jesthata Padak I (Bengali: জ্যেষ্ঠতা পদক ১) is intended for awarding members of the armed forces for 10 years or more of impeccable service. JP-1 conferrable on completion of 10 yrs unblemished service career

== Border guard medals ==
These medals were awarded to members of Bangladesh Rifles (BDR) until 2009 for their bravery.

Name	Ribbon	Image (Front)	Image (Back)	Description
Bangladesh Rifles Padak				This medal was awarded to members of Bangladesh Rifles for their incomparable bravery.
President Rifles Padak				This medal was awarded to members of Bangladesh Rifles for their bravery.

The border guard medals are intended for awarding members of Border Guard Bangladesh.

Name	Ribbon	Image (Front)	Image (Back)	Description
Border Guard Bangladesh Medal (BGBM)				This medal is awarded to members of BGB for their incomparable bravery.
President Border Guard Medal (PBGM)				This medal is awarded to members of BGB for their bravery.
Border Guard Bangladesh Medal Service (BGBMS)				This medal is awarded to members of BGB for their incomparable service.
President Border Guard Medal Service (PBGMS)				This medal is awarded to members of BGB for their service.
Border Guard Obodan Medal (BGOM)				This medal is awarded to members of BGB who have contributed to the force but have not received any of the gallantry medals.

Other medals of Border Guard Bangladesh

Name	Ribbon	Image (Front)	Image (Back)	Description
BGB Punargathan Padak				BGB Punargathan Padak (BGB Rebuilding medal) was awarded to the individuals who contributed in the reformation of the force.
BGB Service Medal				This medal is awarded to the officers of Bangladesh Army who have worked in BGB.
Shimanto Padak				This medal is awarded to members of BGB.
BGB Gourob Chinho Padak				
Rokto Rin Padak				
Rokto Snat Padak				
BGB Seniority Medal-1				This medal is awarded to members of BGB for 10 years of service.
BGB Seniority Medal-2				This medal is awarded to members of BGB for 20 years of service.
BGB Seniority Medal-3				This medal is awarded to members of BGB for 27 years of service.

== Coast Guard medals ==
Name	Ribbon	Image (Front)	Image (Back)	Description
Bangladesh Coast Guard Medal (BCGM)				This medal is awarded to members of BCG for their Incomparable bravery.
President Coast Guard Medal (PCGM)				This medal is awarded to members of BCG for their bravery.
'Bangladesh Coast Guard Medal Service (BCGMS)				This medal is awarded to members of BCG for their incomparable service.
President Coast Guard Medal Service (PCGMS)				This medal is awarded to members of BCG for their service.

== Police medals ==
Name	Ribbon	Image (Front)	Image (Back)	Description
Bangladesh Police Medal (BPM)				Police Medal (Bravery) (Bengali: বাংলাদেশ পুলিশ পদক (সাহসিকতা) is intended for the awarding the officers of Bangladesh Police and Rapid Action Battalion for their incomparable bravery. Police medals are awarded every year in the annual Police Week Parade.
President Police Medal (PPM)				This medal is awarded to members of police & RAB for their bravery.
Bangladesh Police Medal Service (BPMS)				This medal is awarded to members of police & RAB for their incomparable service.
President Police Medal Service (PPMS)				This medal is awarded to members of police & RAB for their bravery.

Other medals of police

Name	Ribbon	Image (Front)	Image (Back)	Description
Police Seniority Medal-1				This medal is awarded to members of police for 10 years of impeccable service.
Police Seniority Medal-2				This medal is awarded to members of police for 20 years of impeccable service.
Police Seniority Medal-3				This medal is awarded to members of police for 27 years of impeccable service.
Centenary Medal of Police Academy				This medal was established in 2012 to commemorate the centenary of Bangladesh Police Academy.
Police Staff College Medal				

== Bangladesh Ansar & Village Defence Party medals ==
Bangladesh Ansar Medals

Name	Ribbon	Image (Front)	Image (Back)	Description
Bangladesh Ansar Medal (BAM)				This medal is awarded to members of Ansar for their incomparable bravery.
President Ansar Medal (PAM)				This medal is awarded to members of Ansar for their bravery.
Bangladesh Ansar Medal Service (BAMS)				This medal is awarded to members of Ansar for their incomparable service.
President Ansar Medal Service (PAMS)				This medal is awarded to members of Ansar for their service.

Village Defence Party Medals

Name	Ribbon	Image (Front)	Image (Back)	Description
Bangladesh Village Defence Party Medal (BVDPM)				This medal is awarded to members of VDP for their incomparable bravery.
President Village Defence Party Medal (PVDPM)				This medal is awarded to members of VDP for their bravery.
Bangladesh Village Defence Party Medal Service (BVDPMS)				This medal is awarded to members of VDP for their incomparable service.
President Village Defence Party Medal Service (PVDPMS)				This medal is awarded to members of VDP for their service.

== Bangladesh Fire Service & Civil Defence medals ==
Name	Ribbon	Medal	Description
Bangladesh Fire Service & Civil Defence Medal			Awarded to members of FSCD for incomparable bravery.
President Fire Service & Civil Defence Medal			Awarded to members of FSCD for bravery.
Bangladesh Fire Service & Civil Defence Medal (Service)			Awarded to members of FSCD for incomparable service.
President Fire Service & Civil Defence Padak (Service)			Awarded to members of FSCD for service.

== United Nations Service medals ==
Name	Ribbon	Medal
United Nations Medal		
United Nations Organization Stabilization Mission in the Democratic Republic of the Congo (MONUSCO)		
United Nations Interim Force in Lebanon (UNIFIL)		
United Nations Mission in South Sudan (UNMISS)		
United Nations–African Union Mission in Darfur (UNAMID)		
United Nations Mission for the Referendum in Western Sahara (MINURSO)		
United Nations Multidimensional Integrated Stabilization Mission in Mali (MINUSMA)		
United Nations Multidimensional Integrated Stabilization Mission in the Central African Republic (MINUSCA)		
Service in the United Nations Headquarters (UNHQ)		
United Nations Mission in Haiti (UNMIH)		
United Nations Iraq–Kuwait Observation Mission (UNIKOM)		
United Nations Iran–Iraq Military Observer Group (UNIIMOG)		
United Nations Transition Assistance Group (UNTAG)		
United Nations Operation in Somalia II (UNOSOM II)		
United Nations Supervision Mission in Syria (UNSMIS)		
United Nations Mission in Sudan (UNMIS)		
United Nations Mission in the Central African Republic and Chad (MINURCAT)		
United Nations Mission in Liberia (UNMIL)		
United Nations Mission of Observers in Prevlaka (UNMOP)		
United Nations Protection Force (UNPROFOR)		
United Nations Observer Mission in Georgia (UNOMIG)		
United Nations Transitional Authority in Cambodia (UNTAC)		
United Nations Mission in East Timor (UNAMET)		
United Nations Assistance Mission for Rwanda (UNAMIR)		
United Nations Mission in Ethiopia and Eritrea (UNMEE)		
United Nations Mission of Observers in Tajikistan (UNMOT)		
United Nations Guards Contingent in Iraq (UNGCI)		
United Nations Interim Security Force for Abeyi (UNISFA)		
United Nations Integrated Mission in East Timor (UNMIT)		

== Commendation Badge ==
The Commendation Badge is awarded to the members of the Bangladesh Army, Bangladesh Navy and Bangladesh Air Force, Border Guard Bangladesh & Bangladesh Coast Guard who have received the commendation letter from the respective chief/director general of the branch/force.

Service Name	Image	Description
Bangladesh Army		The CAS Commendation Badge of Bangladesh Army (Green for Memorial & Golden for Operational)
Bangladesh Navy		The CNS Commendation Badge of Bangladesh Navy
Bangladesh Air Force		The COAS Commendation Badge of Bangladesh Air Force
Border Guard Bangladesh		The DG, Border Guard Bangladesh Commendation Badge
Bangladesh Coast Guard		The DG, Bangladesh Coast Guard Commendation Badge
Honourable President		The Honourable President's Commendation Badge

== Blood Donor Badge ==
The Blood Donor Medal is awarded to all personnel of the Bangladesh Army, Bangladesh Navy and Bangladesh Air Force who have donated blood three times.

Service Name	Image	Description
Bangladesh Army		Bangladesh Army Blood Donor Medal
Bangladesh Navy		Bangladesh Navy Blood Donor Medal
Bangladesh Air Force		Bangladesh Air Force Blood Donor Medal

== See also ==
- Bangladesh War of Independence
- Awards and decorations of the Bangladesh Liberation War
- Bangladesh Freedom Honour
