= M. Sohail =

Retired Bangladeshi admiral

Mohammad Sohail
- Native name: মোহাম্মদ সোহায়েল
- Allegiance: Bangladesh
- Branch: Bangladesh Navy
- Service years: 1988 – 2024
- Rank: Rear Admiral
- Commands: Chairman of Payra Port Authority; Chairman of Chittagong Port Authority; Commander, Naval Training and Doctrine Command (NATDOC); BNS Haji Mohshin
- Awards: Nou Utkorso Padak (NUP); Commendation Padak
- Police career
- Unit: Rapid Action Battalion
- Allegiance: Bangladesh
- Branch: Bangladesh Police
- Service years: 2009–2013
- Rank: Director
- Awards: PPM (bar)

Mohammad Sohail (Note: (TAS), NUP, PPM, psc, BN) is a former two star officer of the Bangladesh Navy who was relieved of his duties as the chairman of the Chittagong Port Authority. He was the antecedent chairman of the Payra Port Authority and commandant of the Naval Training and Doctrine Command.

== Early life and education ==
Sohail enlisted in the Bangladesh Naval Academy in 1986 and was commissioned in the executive branch on 1 January 1988. Sohail was a torpedo anti-submarine coordinating (TAS) officer and a graduate of the Defence Services Command and Staff College.

== Military career ==
Sohail was a faculty member of Defence Services Command and Staff College. Then served as colonel GS in the Counter Terrorism and Intelligence Bureau (CTIB) and the Internal Affairs Bureau (IAB) at the Directorate General of Forces Intelligence. Soon after Sohail was also appointed in ministry of home affairs at Rapid Action Battalion as the legal and media wing director. He is the only naval officer to be outside the Bangladesh Navy for a considerable duration.

As commodore, Sohail commanded one naval base, the BNS Haji Mohshin. At naval headquarters, Sohail was the director of naval intelligence and submarines. He furthermore led the naval training and doctrine command until January 2022. He was promoted to rear admiral on 22 February 2022 and was deputed to the Ministry of Shipping. On 2 May 2023, he was appointed chairman of the Chittagong Port Authority, where he replaced Rear Admiral M Shahjahan. He was serving as the chairman of the Payra Port Authority and was replaced by Rear Admiral Golam Sadeq.

On 19 August 2024, Sohail was dismissed from the navy by the Yunus administration.Two days later, he was arrested on a corruption allegation.
