= Mohammad Lokmanur Rahman =

Retired two-star admiral in Bangladesh Navy

Lokmanur Rahman
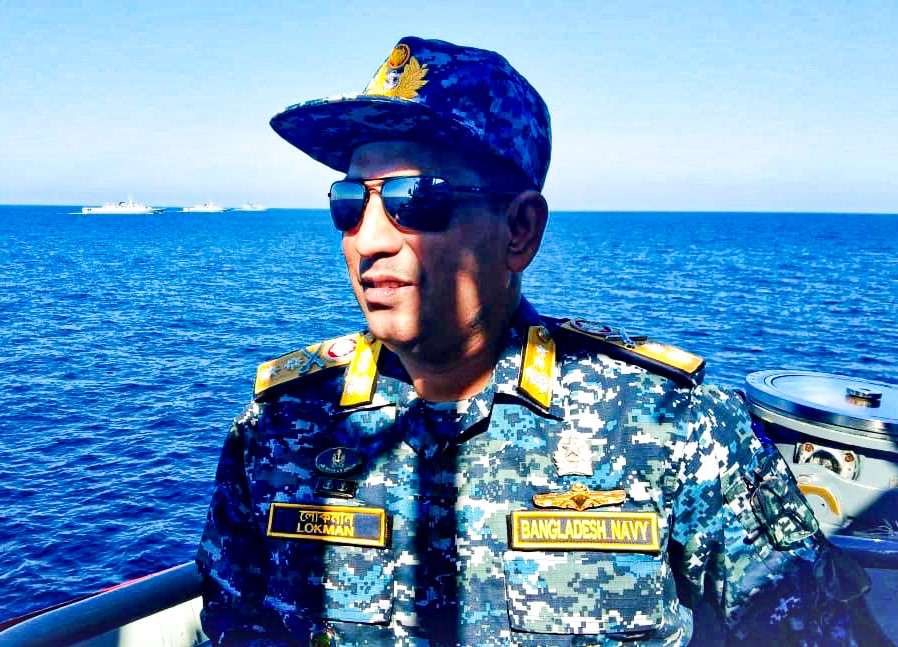
- Lokman on 2019 annual sea exercise
- Native name: এম লোকমানুর রহমান
- Allegiance: Bangladesh
- Branch: Bangladesh Navy
- Service years: 1986 – 2022
- Rank: Rear Admiral
- Commands: Assistant Chief of Naval Staff (Logistics); Commander, Naval Administrative Dhaka (ADMIN DHAKA)
- Awards: Noubahini Padak (NBP); Nou Gourobh Padak (NGP); Commendation Padak
- Spouse: Shamima Yeasmin Luthia
- Children: 2

Mohammad Lokmanur Rahman (Note: (S), NBP, NGP, ndu, psc, BN) is a retired two-star officer in the Bangladesh Navy who served as the assistant chief of naval staff for logistics and the naval administrative authority, Dhaka.

== Early life and education ==
He joined the Bangladesh Navy as an officer cadet on 17 July 1983. After two and a half years of military training, he was commissioned on 1 January 1986 from the Bangladesh Naval Academy in the supply branch with the batch aligned to the 12th BMA Long Course. Lokman later aligned to the Supply Officers Basic Course from the School of Logistics and Management at BNS Titumir.

Lokman is a graduate of the Defense Services Command and Staff College and the National Defense University. He obtained three master's degrees: one in defence studies from National University, a Master of Business Administration from Southeast University, and a Master of Science in national security studies from PLA National Defence University, China. Lokman also has completed the Senior International Defence Management Course at the Naval Postgraduate School in the United States and also the advanced logistics course from the Pakistan Navy War College.

== Military career ==
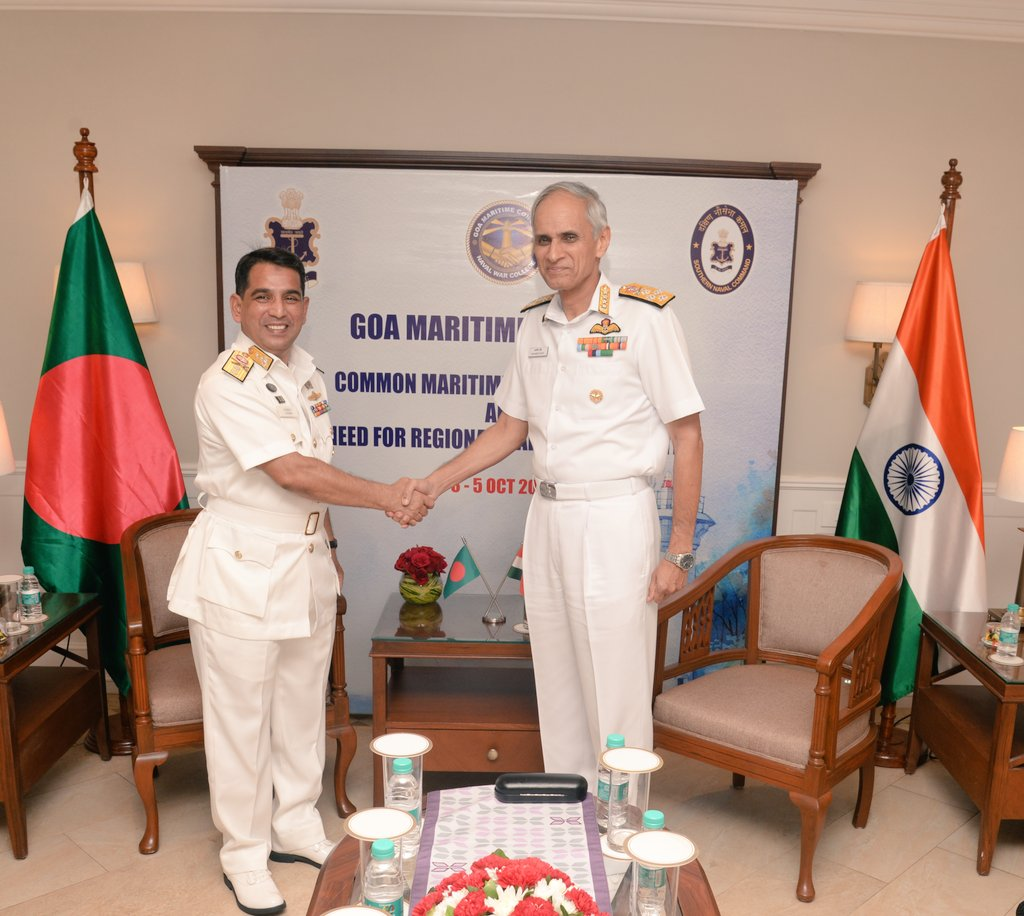
Rear Admiral Lokman with former Indian Navy Chief, Admiral Karambir Singh on 2019

Lokman started his military career on BNS Abu Bakr. He furthermore instructed at the School of Logistics and Management, Defence Services Command and Staff College, and was general staff officer at the Inter Services Selection Board. He was also assistant secretary to former chief of naval staff Rear Admiral Abu Taher. Lokman was the logistics and supply officer at BNS Umar Farooq, BNS Nirbhoy, commander of the naval headquarters base supply depot, and was the operations officer of his parent ship BNS Abu Bakr. He commanded one offshore vessel, one naval base, the BNS Mongla, one small patrol craft, and the naval administrative authority at Dhaka. Lokman was the director of budget, welfare and naval stores at naval headquarters. He also served as director of naval purchase at the Directorate General of Defence Purchase. Soon Lokman served as acting assistant chief of logistics from 21 December 2016 to 26 March 2017 as a commodore. On 27 March 2018, Lokman was promoted to rear admiral and designated as the 17th assistant chief of naval staff for logistics of the navy. Lokman was detached from naval headquarters due to a motion of no confidence and was replaced by then assistant chief of naval staff for materials, Rear Admiral Shafiul Azam, in October 2021. Lokman went to leave per retirement in May 2022 while serving as ambassador under the Ministry of Foreign Affairs. Lokman was awarded the Bangladesh Navy Medal (NBP) in 2019 for his service in the navy. He has also been awarded the Naval Glorious Service Medal (NGP) and the chief of naval staff's commendation letter in 2014.

== Personal life ==
Lokman is married to Shamima Yeasmin Luthia. The couple has two children.
