= Mohammad Moyeenul Haque =

- Allegiance: Bangladesh
- Branch: Bangladesh Navy
- Service years: 1986 – 2023
- Rank: Vice Admiral
- Commands: Assistant Chief of Naval Staff (Materiel); Senior Directing Staff (Navy) of National Defence College; Commodore, Superintendent Dockyard
- Conflicts: UNIKOM
- Awards: Noubahini Padak (NBP); Nau Parodorshita Padak (NPP)
- Police career
- Unit: Rapid Action Battalion
- Allegiance: Bangladesh
- Branch: Bangladesh Police
- Service years: 2006 – 2009
- Rank: Director

Mohammad Moyeenul Haque (Note: (E), NBP, NPP, nswc, psc, BN) is a retired three star admiral and former assistant chief of naval staff (materials) of Bangladesh Navy. Prior that he was the senior directing staff (navy) at the National Defence College and the antecedent commander of BN Dockyard.

== Early life and education ==
Moyeen completed his high school from Faujdarhat Cadet College, and enlisted to Bangladesh Naval Academy as an officer cadet in January 1984. He was commissioned on 1 July 1986 in the engineering branch. He earned two bachelor's degrees from Bangladesh University of Engineering and Technology in naval architecture and marine engineering. Subsequently, Moyeen also attended Pakistan Navy Engineering College and is a graduate from the Defence Services Command and Staff College and the National Defence University in Pakistan.

== Military career ==
Moyeen was engineer officer in three warships and one patrol craft. Moyeen also serve as chief engineer in BNS Titumir and commanded one naval base the BNS Shaheed Moazzem and the BN Dockyard. Moyeen instructed at the Engineering School in BNS Shaheed Moazzem and furthermore, was the director (legal and media) at the Rapid Action Battalion. Moyeen was promoted to commodore on 2015 and was the director of engineering and weapon electrical branch at naval headquarters. On 2019 Moyeen was ameliorated to rear admiral and appointed as the assistant chief of naval staff (Materials) replacing rear admiral Shafiul Azam. Azam again succeeded Moyeen on 9 February 2021 while Moyeen succeeded him as the senior directing staff of the navy in National Defence College. He returned to naval headquarters and re-appointed as the assistant chief of naval staff for materials in December 2022. Moyeen was promoted to vice admiral a day before he went to leave per retirement on 30 November 2023.
