= Bangladesh–Maldives relations =

- Bangladesh: Maldives

Diplomatic mission
- High Commission of Bangladesh, Malé: High Commission of the Maldives, Dhaka

Envoy
- Acting High Commissioner Md Sohel Parvez: High Commissioner Shiuneen Rasheed

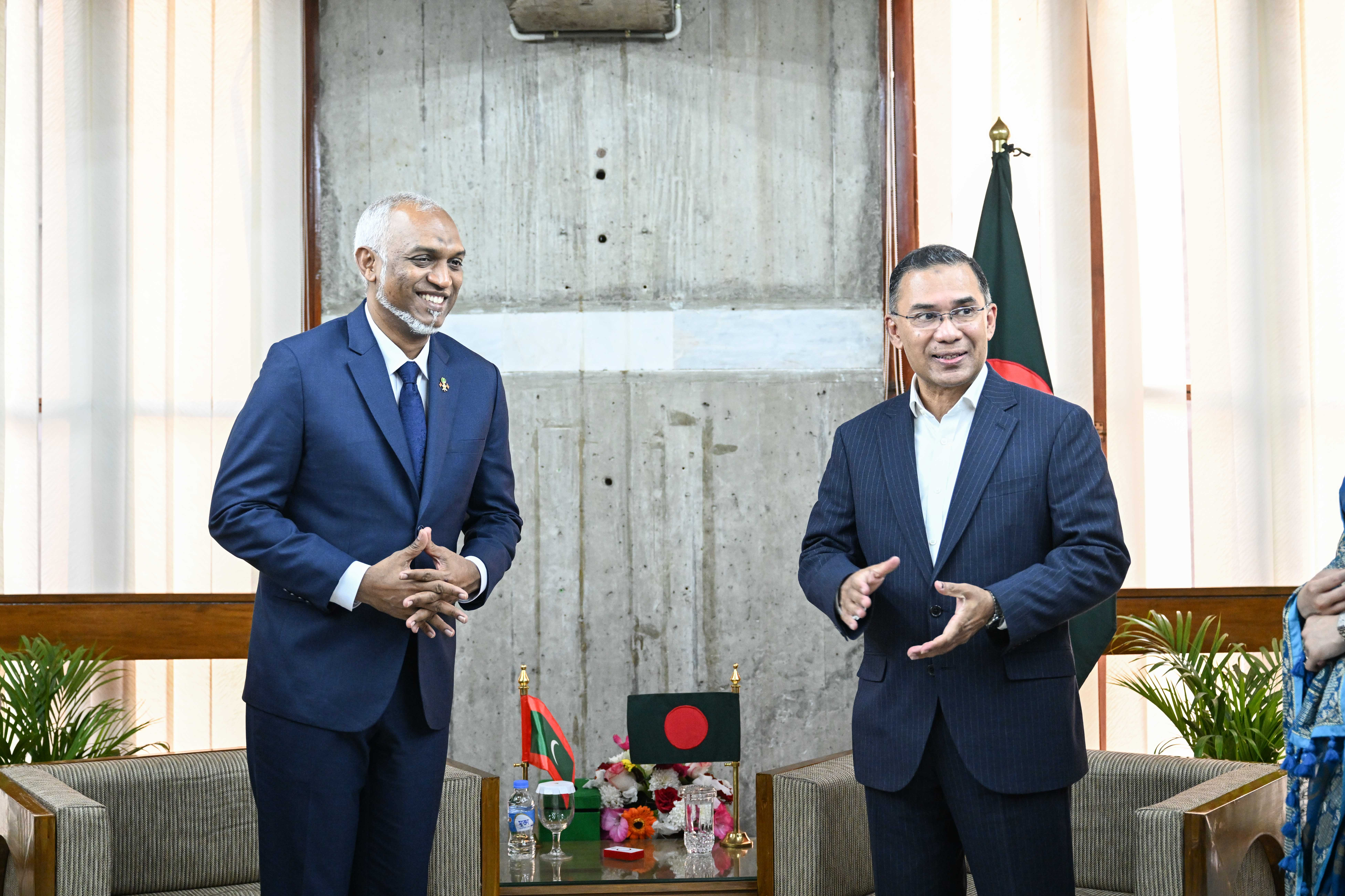
President of Maldives Mohamed Muizzu meeting with newly elected Prime Minister of Bangladesh Tarique Rahman

Bangladesh and Maldives established diplomatic relations in 1978.

== History ==
The 14th-century Moroccan explorer Ibn Battuta identified Sultan Salahuddin Salih as a Bengali and credited him for the establishment of a new dynasty in the Maldives including his son Omar I and a granddaughter, Khadijah. Other records have also mentioned a granddaughter of Alauddin Husain Shah being a queen in the Maldives too.

The Maldives and Bangladesh established diplomatic relations on 22 September 1978. The Maldives opened its High Commission in Bangladesh in 2008. In 2011, the Maldives government removed duty on all Bangladesh exports to the country. In 2011, Bangladesh Army gave Maldives National Defence Force 7 military trucks. Maldives closed its High Commission in Dhaka in March 2014 after the foreign ministry budget was slashed by 40 percent. Bangladesh offered to pay rent for embassy premises among other local costs but was refused "politely" by Maldives.

In December 2014, Bangladesh sent 100 thousand litres of water after Maldives' sole water desalination plant stopped working after catching fire. Maldives announced its intention to reopen the High Commission in Dhaka in July 2015. The BNS Somudra Avijan delivered to the Maldives more than 100 metric tons of food, medicine and medical equipment in COVID-19 pandemic assistance in April 2020. A Bangladesh Air Force medical team supported Maldives in their COVID-19 vaccination program in 2021.

== Economic relations ==
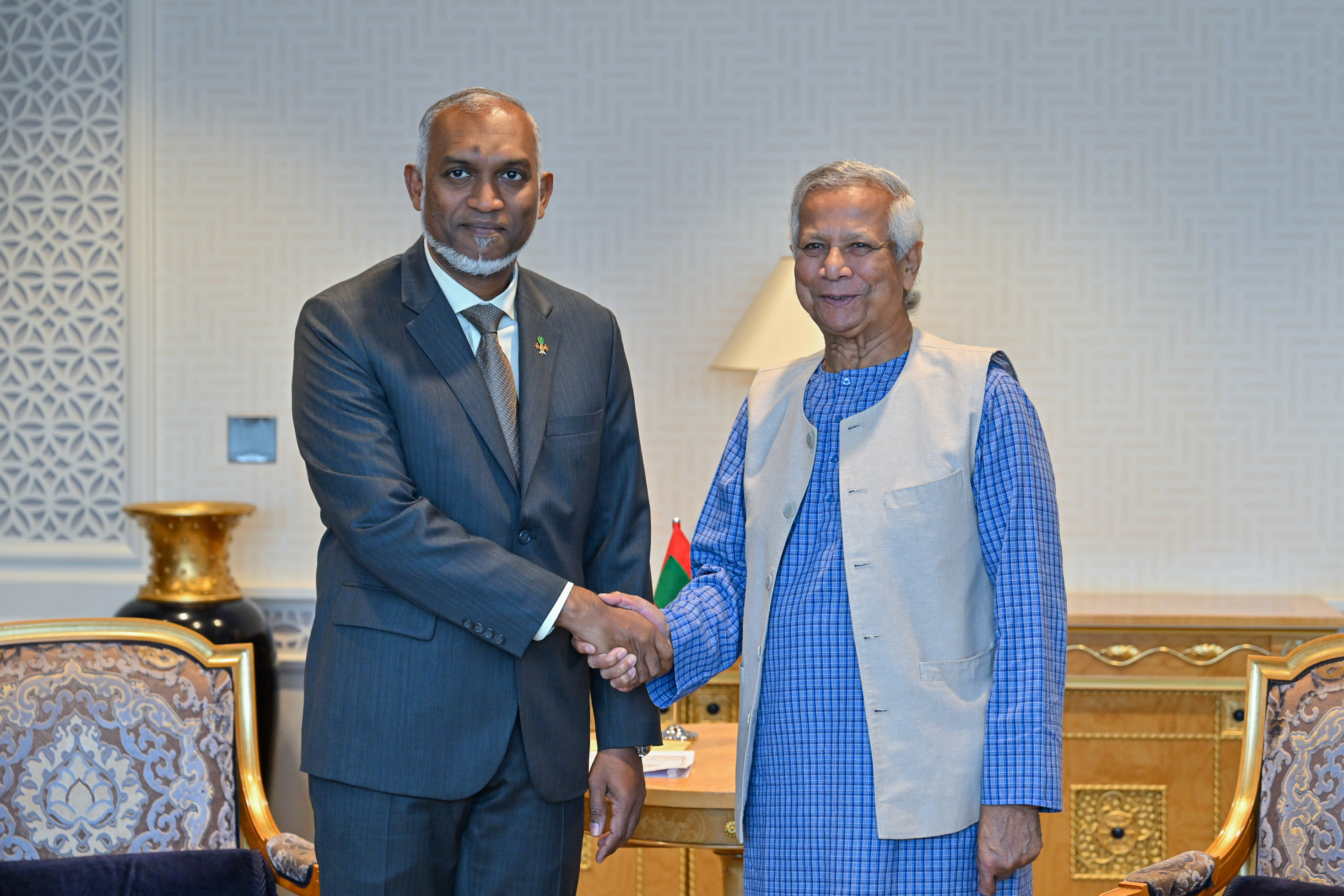
President of Maldives Mohamed Muizzu meets Noble Peace Laureate Muhammad Yunus, the Chief Adviser of Bangladesh in September 2024

The Maldives has a significant Bangladeshi migrant worker population and has encouraged the migration of Bangladeshi workers. Bangladesh has a High Commission in the Maldives. Maldivian government regularized the immigration status of more than 16 thousand Bangladeshi migrants on 2009. In 2011 Bangladesh exported goods worth US$0.72 million and imported US$1.46 million from Maldives. Official estimated suggest there are 70 to 80 thousand Bangladeshis in the Maldives. On 30 March 2015, the Bangladeshi expatriate community held a protest outside the Bangladeshi High Commission to protest against the death of two Bangladeshi expatriates. The Maldivian government warned that the protesters risked losing their visas. Ahmed Tholal, the Vice President of Human Rights Commission in Maldives, called the government move unconstitutional. Bangladesh also exports pharmaceutical medicine to Maldives.

== Representatives ==
=== High Commissioner of Bangladesh to the Maldives ===
- Abu Sayed Mohammad Abdul Awal (2 August 2010 – 15 December 2014)
- Kazi Sarwar Hossain (25 March 2015 – 5 December 2016)
- Akhtar Habib (12 June 2017 – 26 January 2020)
- Mohammad Nazmul Hassan (31 August 2020 – 1 February 2022)
- S.M Abul Kalam Azad (admiral) (6 April 2022 – 10 August 2024)
- Md Nazmul Islam (since 27 July 2025)

=== High Commissioner of the Maldives to Bangladesh ===
- Abdul Samad Abdulla (29 April 2008 – 4 February 2009)
- Ahmed Sareer (1 December 2009 – 12 February 2012)
- Mohamed Asim (17 November 2015 – 13 July 2016)
- Aishath Shaan Shakir (23 May 2017 – 30 October 2020)
- Shiruzimath Sameer (29 December 2020 – 30 November 2023)
- Shiuneen Rasheed (3 July 2024 – present)

== See also ==
- South Asian Association for Regional Cooperation (SAARC)
