= Ministry of Shipping (Bangladesh) =

Government ministry of Bangladesh

- নৌপরিবহন মন্ত্রণালয়
- Government Seal of Bangladesh

Ministry overview
- Formed: 20 January 1972; 54 years ago
- Jurisdiction: Government of Bangladesh
- Headquarters: Bangladesh Secretariat, Dhaka
- Annual budget: ৳9081 crore (US$740 million) (2026-2027)
- Minister responsible: Sheikh Rabiul Alam, Minister of Shipping
- Minister of State responsible: Md. Razib Ahsan
- Ministry executive: Md. Yusuf, Senior Secretary
- Child agencies: Bangladesh Inland Water Transport Authority; Bangladesh Inland Water Transport Corporation; Bangladesh Land Port Authority; Bangladesh Marine Academy; Bangladesh Shipping Corporation; Chittagong Port Authority; Department of Shipping; Mongla Port Authority; National Maritime Institute; Payra Port Authority
- Website: mos.gov.bd

The Ministry of Shipping (Bengali: নৌপরিবহন মন্ত্রণালয়, romanized: Nauparibahana Montronaloy) is a ministry of the Government of Bangladesh responsible for the formulation and administration of policies, laws, and regulations related to shipping and maritime affairs, including the oversight of port authorities and maritime institutions in the country.

== Directorates ==
- Bangladesh Inland Water Transport Authority
- Bangladesh Inland Water Transport Corporation
- Bangladesh Land Port Authority
- Bangladesh Marine Academy
- Bangladesh Shipping Corporation
- Chittagong Port Authority
- Department of Shipping
- Mongla Port Authority
- National Maritime Institute
- Payra Port Authority

== See also ==
- ABM Zahidul Haq, former Bangladesh Deputy Minister of Shipping
- Bangladesh Marine Fisheries Academy
