= Jobair Ahmad =

Jobair Ahmed
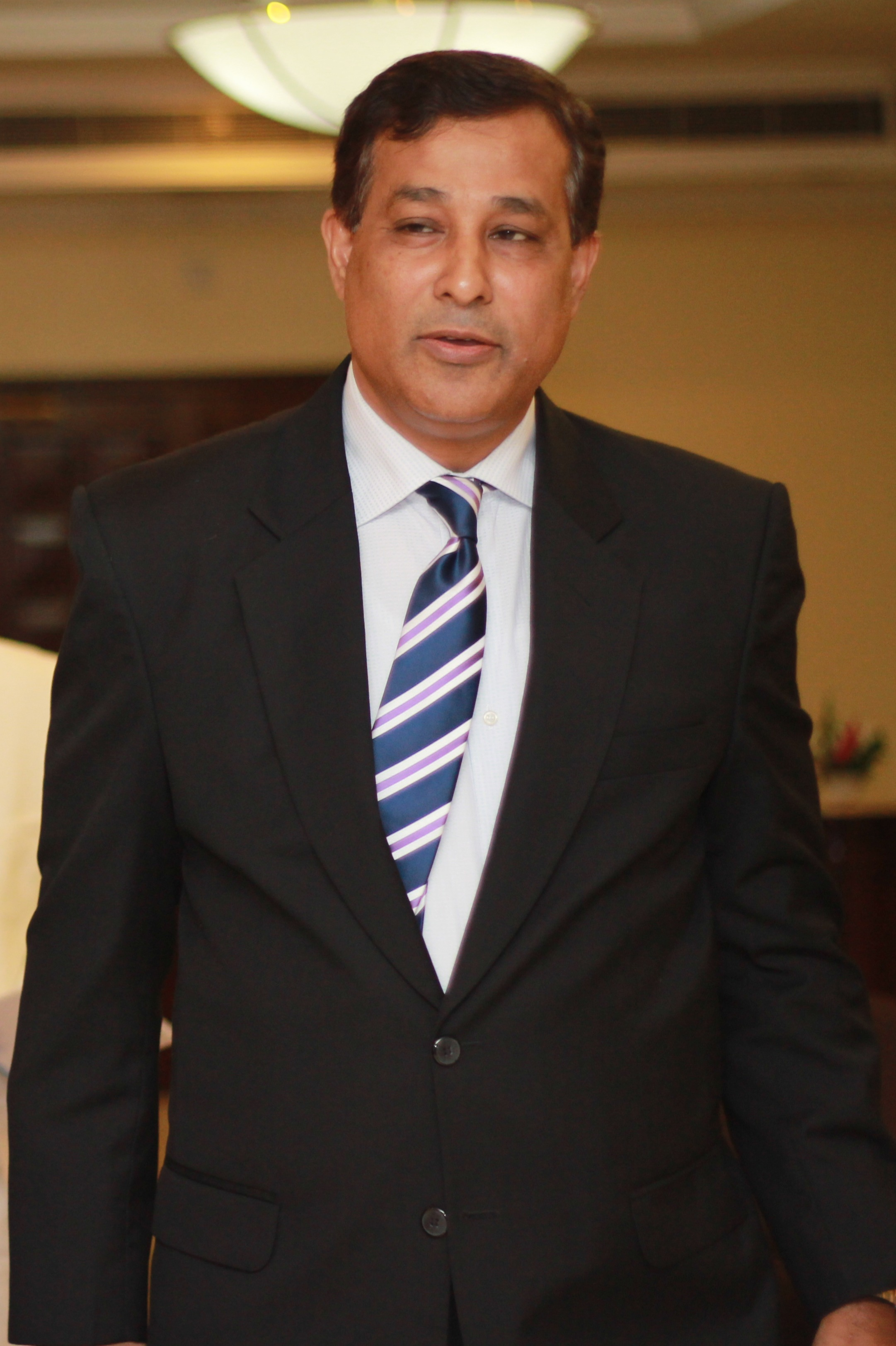
- Born: 16 October 1961 (age 64); Chittagong, East Pakistan, Pakistan
- Military career
- Allegiance: Bangladesh
- Branch: Bangladesh Navy
- Service years: 1982 - 2017
- Rank: Commodore
- Commands: Commander, Naval Administrative Authority Dhaka (ADMIN DHAKA); Director General of Department of Shipping; Managing Director of Bangladesh Shipping Corporation
- Awards: Oshamanno Sheba Padak (OSP); Independence Day Award

Jobair Ahmad (born 16 October 1961) is a one-star-ranked retired naval officer of Bangladesh and chief advisor of Primeasia University. He is the vice-chairman of Prime Islami Life Insurance Limited.

Ahmad was the pro-vice chancellor in Bangladesh University of Professionals. He is a former director general of the Department of Shipping, river transport regulatory agency. He is a former member of the Chittagong Port Authority.

== Early life and education ==
Ahmed was born on 16 October 1961 in Chittagong of then East Pakistan, Pakistan. His father was Kaikobad Ahmad. His grandfather, Sultan Ahmed, was a member of the Legislative Assembly of Pakistan. Ahmed joined the Bangladesh Naval Academy as an officer cadet on 1 November 1979. He was then commissioned in the engineering branch of the Bangladesh Navy on 5 May 1982. He furthermore studied engineering at the Marshal Tito Military Academy of the Yugoslav People's Army School.

== Military career ==
Ahmed served as engineer officer in four warships and two missile crafts. He was also the chief engineer of BNS Issa Khan and commanded two naval base and the naval administrative authority at Dhaka. At naval headquarters, Ahmed was the director of naval intelligence and furthermore, director of Bangladesh Inland Water Transport Authority as commander. He was ameliorated to captain and designated to Chittagong Port Authority as director and also the president of Chittagong Port Development and Research Council. He was then promoted to commodore on 2008 and appointed as sergeant-at-arms in the Bangladesh Parliament Secretariat. In April 2011 Ahmed succeeded Rear Admiral Bazlur Rahman as the director general of Department of Shipping.

Bangladesh Civil Service (Taxation) Association announced a boycott of Ahmed for misbehaving with Mongla Port Customs Commissioner Humayun Kabir. On December 2013, Ahmed was appointed as managing director of Bangladesh Shipping Corporation. He went to leave per retirement in July 2017.

Ahmed was elected vice-chairman of Prime Islami Life Insurance Limited on 2019. Currently he is serving as a director of the insurance company as of July 2020.
