= Yahya Syed =

Yayha Syed
- Military career
- Allegiance: Bangladesh
- Branch: Bangladesh Navy; Bangladesh Coast Guard
- Service years: 1983 - 2019
- Rank: Commodore
- Commands: Chairman of Chittagong Port Authority; Deputy Commandant of Defence Services Command and Staff College; Commodore, BNS Abu Bakr; Managing Director of Bangladesh Shipping Corporation
- Conflicts: UNOCI; UNAMID
- Awards: Independence Day Award

Yahya Syed is a retired commodore of the Bangladesh Navy and former managing director of Bangladesh Shipping Corporation and furthermore chairman of Chittagong Port Authority.

== Early life ==
Syed joined the Bangladesh Navy in 1981. He received training at the Britannia Royal Naval College. He was commissioned in 1983 in the Bangladesh Navy. He received further specialized training on signal communication in Pakistan. He carried out further studies at the Asia-Pacific Center for Security Studies in Hawaii and École Militaire in Paris. He is an alumnus of National Defence College and Preston University in Wyoming.

== Career ==
Syed commanded a frigate of the Bangladesh Navy and was the commanding officer of base BNS Shaheed Moazzem. As captain, Syed served as the chairman of the Chittagong Port Authority for six months commenced on November 2006. He served as the deputy commandant of the Defence Services Command and Staff College. He served as the chief military personnel officer of the United Nations–African Union Mission in Darfur. He was the military liaison officer of the United Nations Operation in Côte d'Ivoire. On 6 April 2017, he was appointed managing director of Bangladesh Shipping Corporation replacing Commodore Jobair Ahmad. During his term as managing director, he added 26 ships to Bangladesh Shipping Corporation. He was the deputy director (second in command) of the Bangladesh Coast Guard.
