= Riaz Uddin Ahmed (admiral) =

- Allegiance: Bangladesh
- Branch: Bangladesh Navy
- Service years: 1980 – 2016
- Rank: Rear Admiral
- Commands: Chairman of Chittagong Port Authority; Chairman of Mongla Port Authority; Managing Director of Khulna Shipyard
- Awards: Bisishtho Sheba Padak (BSP); Oshamanno Sheba Padak (OSP)

Riaz Uddin Ahmed (Note: (E), OSP, BSP, ndu, afwc, psc, BN) is a retired two star officer of Bangladesh Navy and a former chairman of the Chittagong Port Authority, and the Mongla Port Authority. Ahmed is also a former managing director of the Khulna Shipyard, and of Summit Oil and Shipping Company Limited for Summit Group.

== Education ==
Ahmed enlisted to Bangladesh Naval Academy in 1978 and was commissioned in the engineering branch on 1980. Ahmed is a graduate of the Pakistan Navy War College and the Armed Forces War College. He obtained his Bachelor of Science degrees on naval architecture and marine engineering from the Bangladesh University of Engineering and Technology and attended a naval engineering seminar from the People's Liberation Army National Defense University.

== Military career ==
Ahmed was engineer officer to three warships and two patrol crafts. He also commanded two naval base and moreover was the managing director of Khulna Shipyard. Ahmed oversaw the construction of the first naval landing crafts in Bangladesh. On 9 July 2008, Ahmed was appointed as the chairman of Chittagong Port Authority.

Ahmed returned to naval headquarters on 12 February 2011 and designated as director of engineering. He was succeeded by commodore M. Anwarul Islam. In November 2013, Ahmed was promoted to rear admiral and was attached to the Armed Forces Division to serve as additional principal staff officer for the navy. Ahmed later served as the chairman of the Mongla Port Authority till his leave per retirement on 2016. He joined the Summit Group on 2017.

Ahmed was appointed advisor to Summit Oil and Shipping Company Limited in August 2017. He is a member of the managing committee of Chittagong Boat Club. He was the managing director of Summit Oil and Shipping Company Limited and an independent director of Summit Alliance Port Limited, subsidiaries of Summit Group. He was a member of Kurmitola Golf Club and the International Association of Ports and Harbors.
