= Zulfiqur Aziz =

Bangladeshi admiral

- Born: October 18, 1963 (age 62); Pabna, East Pakistan, Pakistan
- Allegiance: Bangladesh
- Branch: Bangladesh Navy
- Service years: 1984 – 2021
- Rank: Rear Admiral
- Commands: Chairman, Chittagong Port Authority; Member (Engineering), Chittagong Port Authority; CSD, BN Dockyard
- Education: Bangladesh University of Engineering and Technology

Zulfiqur Aziz (born October 18, 1963) is a retired rear admiral of the Bangladesh Navy. He is the former chairman of Chittagong Port Authority.

== Early life and education ==
Zulfiqur Aziz was born into a Bengali Muslim family of Pabna District on October 18, 1963. He is an alumnus of Notre Dame College, Dhaka. He completed his graduation in mechanical engineering from Bangladesh University of Engineering and Technology in 1989.

== Career ==
He joined Bangladesh Navy in January 1984 as an officer cadet. He achieved a marine engineering specialisation degree from India in 1992.

In September 2012, Aziz was appointed member (engineering) of Chittagong Port Authority. In January 2018, he was promoted to chairman, replacing Rear Admiral Mohammad Khaled Iqbal. In November 2018, Aziz was promoted to rear admiral from commodore. On April 12, 2020, Rear Admiral S.M Abul Kalam Azad replaced him as chairman of the Chittagong Port Authority. He served as the commodore superintendent dockyard from April 16, 2020, to November 9, 2021.
