= Golam Sadeq =

Rear-Admiral in the Bangladesh Navy

- Allegiance: Bangladesh
- Branch: Bangladesh Navy
- Service years: 1989 – present
- Rank: Rear Admiral
- Commands: Commander, Khulna Naval Area (COMKHUL); Chairman of Payra Port Authority; Chairman of Bangladesh Inland Water Transport Authority; Senior Directing Staff (Navy) of National Defence College; Commandant of Bangladesh Naval Academy; Commander, Special Warfare Diving and Salvage (COMSWADS)
- Awards: Nou Gourobh Padak (NGP); Commendation Padak

Golam Sadeq (Note: (G), NGP, ndc, ncc, psc, BN) is a two-star officer in the Bangladesh Navy and assistant chief of naval staff (personnel) at Naval Headquarters. Prior to join here he was commander of Khulna naval area. He is a former chairman of Payra Port Authority, the Bangladesh Inland Water Transport Authority and also antecedent commandant of Bangladesh Naval Academy

== Early life and education ==
Sadeq finished high school from the Rangpur Cadet College and enlisted to Bangladesh Naval Academy on 1987. Soon after he received naval training from the Royal Malaysian Navy up until 1990. Sadeq is a naval artillery officer and a graduate of Defence Services Command and Staff College, the Royal Naval College, Greenwich and furthermore the National Defence College. Sadeq also attended a naval command course from the Naval War College at Newport, United States and was awarded Top Gun Awards for confidential records at the Command and Staff Training Institute.

== Military career ==
Sadeq was aide-de-camp to chief of naval staff rear admiral Mohammad Nurul Islam in the rank of lieutenant. Sadeq commanded an offshore missile craft in the same rank. Later on he commanded, one warship, two patrol crafts, one offshore vessel and one minesweeper craft. Sadeq moreover commanded two naval bases, the Special Warfare Diving and Salvage and the Bangladesh Naval Academy. In January 2020, he became chairman of Bangladesh Inland Water Transport Authority. Sadeq was promoted to rear admiral in March 2023 and was designated briefly as senior directing staff (navy) for the National Defence College. In April 2023, he was appointed as chairman of Payra Port Authority. Sadeq returned to navy in January 2024.

== Personal life ==
Rear Admiral Sadeq is married and father of a son Tajwar Sadeq and a daughter Tahniyat Sadeq.
