= Nazmul Islam (disambiguation) =

Nazmul Islam (born 1991) is a Bangladeshi cricketer.

Nazmul Islam may also refer to:

- Nazmul Islam (diplomat), Bangladeshi ambassador to China
- Muhammad Nazmul Islam, Bangladesh high-commissioner to the Maldives
- Nazmul Islam Rasel (born 1996), Bangladeshi footballer
