= High Commission of Bangladesh, Malé =

Diplomatic mission of Bangladesh in Malé, Maldives

- Location: Maldives
- Address: Plot 10982, Street 16, Nirolhu Magu, Hulhumalé
- Coordinates: 4.210446°N 73.543161°E
- Website: Official website

The High Commission of Bangladesh, Malé is the diplomatic mission of Bangladesh in Maldives.

== History ==
Diplomatic relations between Bangladesh and the Maldives were established on September 22, 1978.

For nearly 20 years after the establishment of diplomatic relations, no High Commissioner or Ambassador Extraordinary and Plenipotentiary was stationed there, but on 8 August 1998, the High Commissioner's Office was opened in Malé, and Major General Harun Ahmed Chowdhury was appointed as the first High Commissioner.

The mission was the Embassy of Bangladesh in the Maldives (Bengali: মালদ্বীপে বাংলাদেশ দূতাবাস) from October 2016, when the Maldives left the Commonwealth, until February 2020.

On 1 February 2020, when the Maldives returned to its status as a Commonwealth republic, this overseas mission reverted to the Bangladesh High Commission.

In July 2021, the High Commission changed locations from Malé to Hulhumalé (both administratively belong to Malé).

== Address ==
Plot 10982, Street 16, Nirolhu Magu, Hulhumalé

It has been operating at Plot 10982, Street 16, Nirolhu Magu, Hulhumalé since July 2021. The previous address was "G. Ufriya (7th & 8th Floor), Lonuziyaraih Magu, Malé".

== High Commissioner ==
From 31 August 2020 to 10 August 2024, Rear Admiral S.M. Abul Kalam Azad served as the High Commissioner.

== Related ==
- High Commission of the Maldives, Dhaka
- Bangladesh–Maldives relations
