= Anwarul Islam =

Anwarul Islam may refer to:

- Baby Islam, Bangladeshi cinematographer
- M. Anwarul Islam, Bangladesh Navy admiral
- Md. Anwarul Islam, Bangladeshi politician
- Md Anwarul Islam (politician), Bangladeshi politician
- Md Anwarul Islam Sarker, Bangladeshi civil servant
- Anwarul Islam (Patuakhali politician), Bangladeshi politician
