= Mohammad Khaled Iqbal =

Bangladeshi admiral

- Allegiance: Bangladesh
- Branch: Bangladesh Navy
- Service years: 1983 – 2023
- Rank: Rear Admiral
- Commands: Commodore, Superintendent Dockyard; Chairman, Chittagong Port Authority; Vice-Chancellor of Bangladesh Maritime University
- Conflicts: UNOCI
- Alma mater: Bangladesh Naval Academy; Italian Naval Academy; National Defence College; University of Wollongong

Mohammad Khaled Iqbal is a retired rear admiral of the Bangladesh Navy and former vice-chancellor of Bangladesh Maritime University. He is the former chairman of Chittagong Port Authority.

== Early life ==
Iqbal graduated from Defence Services Staff College and the National Defence College. He completed a course on maritime law at the University of Wollongong.

== Career ==
Iqbal joined Bangladesh Navy in 1981. He received his commission in Bangladesh Navy on 1 June 1983. He trained at the Italian Naval Academy in 1985.

Iqbal served in the United Nations Operation in Côte d'Ivoire in 2006.

The Anti-Corruption Commission investigated the Chittagong Port Authority while Iqbal was chairman. He was criticized for the congestion at Chittagong Port by the Parliamentary standing committee on shipping ministry. In January 2018, Rear Admiral Zulfiqur Aziz replaced Iqbal as chairman of the Chittagong Port Authority. Iqbal was criticized for leading team of the Chittagong Port Authority to Morocco and South Africa which was set to conclude six days before his term as chairman expired. The Daily Star questioned the benefit of the port authority on spending 10 million BDT on the trip which they question whether it was a pleasure trip.

In February 2018, Iqbal was appointed the vice-chancellor of the Bangabandhu Sheikh Mujibur Rahman Maritime University succeeding Rear Admiral A. S. M. Abdul Baten. Rear Admiral Mohammad Musa replaced Iqbal as the vice-chancellor of the Bangabandhu Sheikh Mujibur Rahman Maritime University in January 2023.

Iqbal is the chief executive of ports, logistics & economic zone of A K Khan & Company.
