= Bazlur Rahman (admiral) =

Bangladeshi admiral

- Born: June 18, 1956 (age 70); Dacca, East Pakistan, Pakistan
- Allegiance: Bangladesh
- Branch: Bangladesh Navy
- Service years: 1975 – 2011
- Rank: Rear Admiral
- Commands: Assistant Chief of Naval Staff (Personnel); Assistant Chief of Naval Staff (Logistics); Director General of Department of Shipping; Commandant of Bangladesh Naval Academy
- Education: Mirzapur Cadet College; Indian Naval Academy; Naval War College

Bazlur Rahman (Note: (G), (MCD), ndc, psc, BN) (born 18 June 1956), is a retired two star officer of the Bangladesh Navy and former director general of the Department of Shipping. Rahman is the antecedent assistant chief of naval staff for logistics and personnel.

== Early life and education ==
Rahman was born on 1956 in Dacca at then East Pakistan of Pakistan (now Dhaka Division, Bangladesh). He graduated high school from the Mirzapur Cadet College and enlisted to Indian Naval Academy through Bangladesh naval cadre on 1973. Rahman was commissioned in executive branch. Initially a gunnery ensign, Rahman later assigned to clearance diving (MCD) officer. He was furthermore trained at Britannia Royal Naval College, National Defence College, Defence Services Command and Staff College and the Surface Warfare School at Newport, United States.

== Military career ==
Rahman commanded two warships, four patrol crafts and one offshore missile craft. At naval headquarters he was the director of drafting authority as commander.

Rahman was promoted to captain and appointed as director of Chittagong Port Authority. He was also the commandant of the Bangladesh Naval Academy. Soon after, Rahman was promoted to commodore on 2005 and returned to naval headquarters for serving as the assistant chief of naval staff for logistics and then for personnel. In April 2009, Rahman was then promoted to rear admiral and appointed as the director general of the Department of Shipping, replacing captain A. K. M. Shafiqullah. He is the only two star officer to held the office so far. Shafiqullah appealed his posting to court against Rahman's appointment and locked the door to the office of the Director General. Shafiqullah's transfer has remain unanimous and posted to a non-combatant office.

In October 2010, Rahman was summoned before the High Court Division following a contempt of court petition filed by the Bangladesh Environmental Lawyers Association after the government allowed "toxic ships" to enter Bangladesh. After Somali pirates captured it, he had to work on getting back MV Jahan Moni and its crew. He told the press they sought help from India, Singapore, and the United Arab Emirates. In March 2011, the National Committee for the Protection of Shipping campaigned for his removal one month before his contract expired. Rahman suggested a conspiracy to prevent the renewal of his contract. On 1 April, Rahman went to leave per retirement and commodore Jobair Ahmad replaced him as the director general of shipping. After that he joined United Group as the commandant of United Maritime Academy.

As of 2025, Rahman is serving as one of the director of United Ashuganj Energy Limited, a subsidiary of the United Group. He is also the chief executive officer of the Power Division of the United Group and furthermore chairperson of Insha Trade Corporation.
