= S. M. Moniruzzaman (admiral) =

Bangladeshi Admiral

Sayed Mohammad Moniruzzaman OSP, ndc, ncc, psc
- সৈয়দ মোহাম্মদ মনিরুজ্জামান
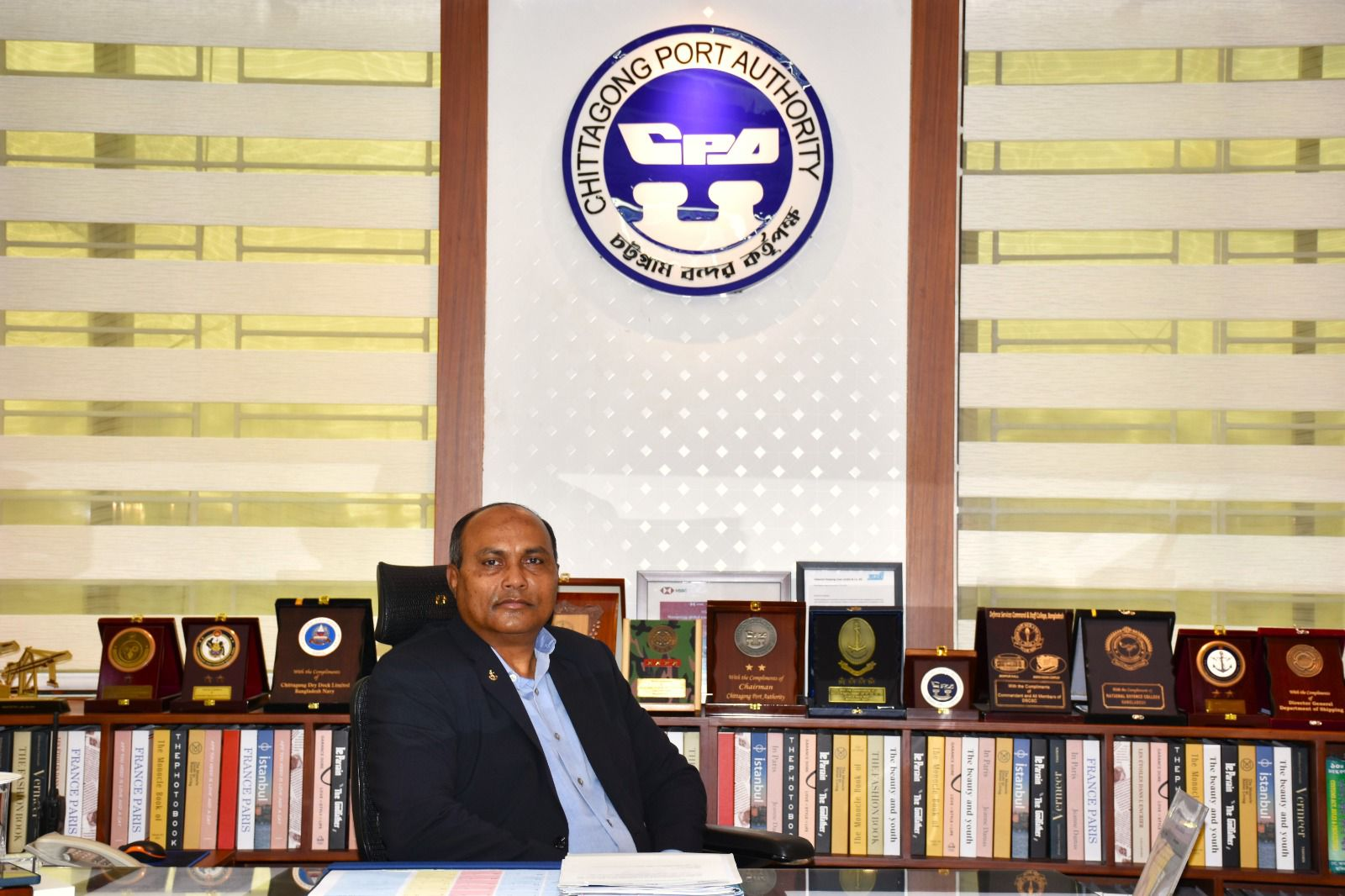
- Born: Kushtia District, Bangladesh
- Military career
- Allegiance: Bangladesh
- Branch: Bangladesh Navy
- Service years: 1990 – present
- Rank: Rear Admiral
- Commands: Chairman of Chittagong Port Authority; Commander, BN Fleet (COMBAN); Managing director of Bangladesh Shipping Corporation.; Commander, Flotilla West (COMFLOT); Managing director of Dockyard and Engineering Works
- Awards: Oshamanno Sheba Padak (OSP)

Rear Admiral Sayed Mohammad Moniruzzaman is a Bangladesh Navy officer who is presently serving as chairman of the Chittagong Port Authority since August 2024. He previously commanded the Bangladesh Navy fleet and held management positions at state-owned maritime enterprises.

== Early life and education ==
Moniruzzaman was born in Kushtia District, Bangladesh. He completed his higher secondary education at Cumilla Cadet College in 1987, graduating with distinction. He joined the Bangladesh Navy as an officer cadet in 1988 and was commissioned in the executive branch in 1990. Moniruzzaman attended several military educational institutions during his career, including the German Naval Academy (Marineschule Mürwik), Pakistan Navy Communication School, Turkish Armed Forces War College (Harp Akademileri), and the US Naval Command College. He holds two master's degrees and two diplomas respectively from Turkey and US. He also attended the Defense Services Command and Staff College and National Defense College in Bangladesh.

== Naval career ==
Moniruzzaman served at various Bangladesh Navy positions throughout his career, completing twelve years of sea service. He commanded several naval vessels, including BNS Khalid Bin Walid, the flagship of the Bangladesh Navy, and few other naval ships & establishment . From 2017 to 2018, he served as chief staff officer to the commander of Chattogram Naval Area. The admiral was the pioneer commander of Flotilla West until January 2020. At Naval Headquarters, he held positions including director of personnel services, director of blue economy (ad hoc), and director of naval training. Moniruzzaman was promoted to rear admiral in January 2023, and was appointed as commander of the Bangladesh Navy fleet (COMBAN). He received the 'Extraordinary Service Medal' (OSP) for his service in Bangladesh Navy.

== Corporate leadership ==
=== Dockyard and Engineering Works ===
In January 2020, Moniruzzaman was appointed as the managing director of Dockyard and Engineering Works Limited in Narayanganj, a state-owned shipbuilding and repair facility.

=== Bangladesh Shipping Corporation ===
In 2022, he became the managing director of the Bangladesh Shipping Corporation, the national shipping line. During fiscal year 2021-22, BSC reported a profit of 226 crore taka.

== Chittagong Port Authority ==
=== Appointment ===
On 11 August 2024, Rear Admiral Moniruzzaman joined as the chairman of the Chittagong Port Authority.

=== Operational performance ===
During calendar year 2024, Chittagong Port handled 3.276 million TEUs, a 7.42% increase from 3.05 million TEUs in 2023. Total cargo handling grew by 3.11% to 123.9 million tonnes. The port handled 3,971 vessels in 2024. In fiscal year 2024-25 CPA reached the highest performance in 48 years when the port handled 3.296 million TEUs, a 4% increase from the previous year. Port revenue in FY 2024-25 reached Tk 52.28 billion, and the port contributed Tk 17.65 billion to the national exchequer. According to port data, vessel waiting times decreased from 4.1 days in June 2024 to an average of 2.24 days by August 2025 and to 'Zero Waiting Time' at the outer anchorage by November 2025.

=== Infrastructure projects ===
==== Laldia Container Terminal (LCT) ====
On 17 November 2025, CPA signed a 30-year concession agreement with APM Terminals and local partner QNS Container Services Ltd for development of the Laldia Container Terminal (LCT). The project, valued at over $550 million, represents one of Bangladesh's largest public-private partnership investments. Under the design-finance-build-operate model, APM Terminal BV will design, finance, construct and operate the terminal, which is expected to begin phased operations between 2027 and 2029. The terminal will add more than 800,000 TEUs of annual capacity and accommodate vessels up to 6,000 TEU, compared to the current 2,800 TEU limit at existing terminals. The project includes electrified cargo handling equipment, solar power installations, and shore power systems.

==== Bay Terminal ====
The Bay Terminal Marine Infrastructure Development Project received $650 million in financing from the World Bank in June 2024 for construction of a climate-resilient breakwater and dredging works. The project has an estimated total cost of approximately $3 billion, with remaining funding expected from private operators under a public-private partnership. The terminal is designed for an annual capacity of 6 million TEUs and expected to begin operations by 2030. DP World and PSA International have been identified as planned operators.

==== Pangaon Inland Container Terminal ====
On 17 November 2025, CPA signed a 22-year concession agreement with MEDLOG, the logistics arm of MSC Group, to operate the Pangaon Inland Container Terminal near Dhaka. The facility, built in 2013, had accumulated operating losses of approximately Tk 1.65 billion over twelve years. MEDLOG plans to expand capacity from 116,000 TEUs to 160,000 TEUs annually.

==== Pakistan–Bangladesh shipping route ====
A direct shipping service between Pakistan and Bangladesh launched on 30 October 2024 through a partnership between DP World and Pakistan's National Logistics Cell. The service reduced transit time from over 25 days to 11 days by eliminating transshipment requirements.
