= School of Logistics and Management =

School of Logistics and Management may refer to:

- Kühne School of Logistics and Management, Kühne Logistics University, Germany
- Pakistan Navy School of Logistics and Management
- School of Logistics and Management (SOLAM), of the Bangladesh Navy
