= Shaheen Rahman =

Bangladeshi Naval officer

- Native name: শাহীন রহমান
- Allegiance: Bangladesh
- Branch: Bangladesh Navy
- Service years: 1989–2026
- Rank: Rear Admiral
- Commands: Assistant Chief of Naval Staff (Personnel); Commander, Khulna Naval Area (COMKHUL); Chairman of Mongla Port Authority; Senior Directing Staff (Navy) of National Defence College; Commandant of Bangladesh Naval Academy
- Conflicts: UNMIH
- Awards: Nou Utkorsho Padak (NUP)
- Alma mater: Pakistan Navy War College; United States Naval War College; National Defence College

Shaheen Rahman (Note: (G), NUP, ndc, ncc, psc, BN) is a retired two star officer of Bangladesh Navy and former chairman of Mongla Port Authority. He was the former commander of western flotilla and the Khulna naval area.

== Early life and education ==
Rahman enlisted to Bangladesh Naval Academy on 1987 and was commissioned in the executive branch on 1 July 1989. He is a naval artillery officer and a graduate of Defence Services Command and Staff College and the National Defence College. Rahman acquired applied gunnery courses from Naval War College in the United States and furthermore attended a seminar at Pakistan Navy War College. He also completed his masters degrees in Defences studies and specialized gunnery training from the Naval Gunnery School at INS Dronacharya in India.

== Military career ==
Rahman commanded three warships, two patrol crafts, one offshore vessel, Khulna naval area and the Bangladesh western flotilla. In addition, Rahman served director of naval training at naval headquarters and the director of border and external affairs at the National Security Intelligence. Soon he was ameliorated to rear admiral and posted as the senior directing staff (navy) in National Defence College. He briefly tenured as the assistant chief of naval staff (personnel) before being transferred to Port of Mongla. Rear Admiral Shaheen retired from Bangladesh Navy at 17 May 2026 after complete his age limit of his rank.

=== UN mission ===
Rahman served with the United Nations peacekeeping force as staff officer at UNMIH Headquarters in Haiti.
