= Department of Shipping =

Bangladeshi Regulatory Agency

- Formation: 1976
- Headquarters: Dhaka, Bangladesh
- Region served: Bangladesh
- Official language: Bengali
- Director General: Commodore M SHAFIUL BARI (ND), ndc, psc, BN
- Parent organization: Ministry of Shipping
- Website: Department of Shipping

Department of Shipping is a Bangladesh government regulatory agency under the Ministry of Shipping of Bangladesh responsible for maritime safety, formulation and enforcement of maritime regulation. The Director General of the Department of Shipping is Commodore Mohammad Maksud Alam.

== History ==
The agency came into existence in 1976 through the merger of Directorate of Shipping and the Controller of Shipping. It is responsible for the regulation of maritime activity in Bangladesh. The department is responsible for safety of inland navigation and issuing registration and annual fitness certificates of the vessels. International Maritime Organization has scrutinized the role of the Department of Shipping over fake competency certificate issued to ships.

Captain AKM Shafiqullah tried to remain in the post of Director General through a verdict of the High Court Division in 2009 and preventing Rear Admiral Bazlur Rahman from taking charge. He had faced criticism for allowing a ship blacklisted by greenpeace to enter Bangladesh for dismantling disobeying instructions from the Prime Minister's Office.

The Department in 2016 blamed lack of flag protection and high interest rate for the dwindling number of Bangladeshi flag carry ships.

== List of director generals ==
List of Ex-Director Generals
| Sl. No. | Name | Period From | Period Till | Reference |
|---|---|---|---|---|
| 1 | Captain M. Shafi | 1 August 1976 | 7 September 1977 | |
| 2 | Captain Q. A. B. M. Rahman | 8 September 1977 | 15 July 1978 | |
| 3 | M. Rawshan Ali (Acting) | 16 July 1978 | 24 October 1978 | |
| 4 | Captain Sufi Md. Ashraful Islam (Acting) | 25 October 1978 | 25 July 1979 | |
| 5 | Abdur Rab (Acting) | 26 July 1979 | 26 August 1979 | |
| 6 | Captain Sufi Md. Ashraful Islam (Acting) | 27 August 1979 | 29 November 1979 | |
| 7 | Captain M. Rahman | 30 November 1979 | 14 September 1980 | |
| 8 | Captain M. Shafi | 15 September 1980 | 23 May 1983 | |
| 9 | Captain Sufi Md. Ashraful Islam (Acting) | 24 May 1983 | 15 January 1984 | |
| 10 | Md. Jalal Uddin Ahmed (Acting) | 16 January 1984 | 23 May 1984 | |
| 11 | Tarek Aneesh Ahmed | 24 May 1984 | 13 September 1986 | |
| 12 | Air Commodore Moin-ul-Islam | 14 September 1986 | 15 August 1987 | |
| 13 | Abdun Noor (Acting) | 16 August 1987 | 13 September 1987 | |
| 14 | Captain Sufi Md. Ashraful Islam | 14 September 1987 | 13 September 1990 | |
| 15 | Fazlur Rahman Chowdhury (Acting) | 14 September 1990 | 9 March 1991 | |
| 16 | Moha: Mazharul Haque (Acting) | 10 March 1991 | 22 February 1992 | |
| 17 | A. M. Khan Chowdhury | 23 February 1992 | 3 November 1992 | |
| 18 | Md. Akhtar Kamal (Contractual) | 4 November 1992 | 3 November 1994 | |
| 19 | Abdul Malek | 8 November 1994 | 28 April 1998 | |
| 20 | Captain M. Azizul Haque | 29 April 1998 | 31 December 1998 | |
| 21 | Abdul Malek | 3 January 1999 | 29 November 2001 | |
| 22 | Captain A. K. M. Ahsanul Azim | 3 December 2001 | 14 January 2002 | |
| 23 | Abdul Malek (Contractual) | 15 January 2002 | 6 July 2002 | |
| 24 | Captain A. K. M. Ahsanul Azim | 7 July 2002 | 31 July 2002 | |
| 25 | Commodore M Ghulam Rabbani | 1 August 2002 | 23 April 2003 | |
| 26 | Captain A. K. M. Ahsanul Azim | 23 April 2003 | 23 November 2004 | |
| 27 | Captain A. K. M. Shafiqullah | 24 November 2004 | 31 March 2009 | |
| 28 | Rear Admiral Bazlur Rahman | 1 April 2009 | 31 March 2011 | |
| 29 | Commodore Jobair Ahmad | 1 April 2011 | 24 December 2013 | |
| 30 | Commodore Md Zakiur Rahman Bhuiyan | 24 December 2013 | 17 January 2017 | |
| 31 | Commodore Syed Ariful Islam | 17 January 2017 | 13 August 2020 | |
| 32 | Commodore Abu Zafar Md. Jalal Uddin | 13 August 2020 | 26 July 2022 | |
| 33 | Commodore Md. Nizamul Haque | 26 July 2022 | 22 May 2023 | |

== See also ==
- Bangladesh Marine Fisheries Academy
