= Ahamed Amin Abdullah =

Bangladesh Navy officer

- Military career
- Allegiance: Bangladesh
- Branch: Bangladesh Navy
- Rank: Commodore
- Commands: BNS Prottoy
- Awards: BSP, psc

Ahamed Amin Abdullah is a commodore in the Bangladesh Navy who currently serves as Member (Harbour & Marine) of the Chittagong Port Authority.

== Career ==
=== Bangladesh Navy ===
Abdullah served as commanding officer of Bangladesh Navy Ship (BNS) Prottoy. In February 2021, he commanded BNS Prottoy

In August 2023, Abdullah was part of a Bangladesh Navy delegation to Myanmar for biannual navy-to-navy talks.

=== Chittagong Port Authority ===
Abdullah serves as Member (Harbour & Marine) of the Chittagong Port Authority. In December 2024, he commented on the port's record-breaking performance in container and vessel handling, stating that the port delivered exceptional performance driven by increased trade and expanded capacity, with vessel waiting times reduced to zero on many occasions.

In November 2024, Abdullah served as chief of the evaluation committee for the Pangaon Inland Container Terminal management contract awarded to Swiss firm Medlog SA.
