= National Maritime Institute =

Research institute in Bangladesh

- Formation: 1952
- Headquarters: Chittagong, Bangladesh
- Region served: Bangladesh
- Official language: Bengali
- Website: nmi.gov.bd

The National Maritime Institute, or NMI, is an autonomous state owned research and educational institute working as a statutory organization that trains mariners and carries out research in Bangladesh. It is located in Chittagong, Bangladesh.

== History ==
The institute was founded in 1952 near Hazi Camp, Pahartali, Chittagong. After Bangladesh gained independence in 1971, the institute was relocated to Seamen's Hostel. In 1973, the institute returned to its original location near the Hazi camp. The permanent campus of the institute was completed in 1994 with the support of the government of Bangladesh and the government of Japan. The institute is under the Ministry of Shipping. It is the only state owned institution providing maritime education in Bangladesh.

== See also ==
- Bangladesh Marine Fisheries Academy
