= Murder of Ghulam Rabbani =

The murder of Ghulam Rabbani refers to the "sensational" murder of Commodore Ghulam Rabbani, an aide-de-camp to Sheikh Mujibur Rahman in Chittagong in 2004. He was a vital witness to the Assassination of Sheikh Mujibur Rahman and the Jail Killing cases. He served as the chairperson of the Chittagong Port Authority.

== Background ==
Rabbani was an aide-de-camp to the founding President of Bangladesh Sheikh Mujibur Rahman. He was the director general of the Department of Shipping. He was an eyewitness in the murder case of Sheikh Mujibur Rahman, who was killed in the 15 August 1975 Bangladeshi coup d'état. He was also a witness of the Jail Killing in which four senior leaders of the Awami League were killed.

In 1999, Rabbani was the chairman of Chittagong Port Authority.

Rabbani was appointed the managing director of the Korean Export Processing Zone, sister concern of Korean Youngone Corporation, in Chittagong. He had terminated two employees of the Korean Export Processing Zone and began a corruption investigation against them.

== Incident ==
Rabbani was travelling to Korean Export Processing Zone on a microbus on 11 April 2004 when he was shot after the bus was intercepted by six to seven people. They also robbed his colleagues in the bus. The site engineer of the Korean Export Processing Zone, AKM Emtajul Islam, filed an attempted murder case. Rabbani died in Bumrungrad International Hospital in Bangkok 13 days later. The attempted murder case was then turned into a murder case.

== Trial ==
Judge M Hasan Imam of Chittagong Divisional Speedy Trial Tribunal sentenced Abdul Malik Sohel, Mohammad Hashim, and Mohammad Selim to life imprisonment in the murder case on 7 April 2005. Abu Naser Chowdhury, former general manager of Korean Export Processing Zone, and Humayun Kabir Chowdhury, former chief security officer of Korean Export Processing Zone, were sentenced to five years imprisonment. Judge M Hasan Imam was critical of Faruk Ahmed, assistant commissioner of Chittagong Metropolitan Police, who was the investigation officer for an improper investigation and ordered a copy of the investigation to be sent to the Inspector General of Police for action against the police officer. Some of the accused were connected to Bangladesh Islami Chhatra Shibir.

Mohammad Hashim was acquitted by the High Court Division in 2008 while the other accused had secured bail in 2005. Abu Naser Chowdhury, Humayun Kabir Chowdhury, and Mohammad Selim were given life term in 2014 by the High Court Division which also ordered a review of the acquittal of Saiful Islam by the lower court. The High Court Division acquitted Abdul Malik Sohel and Mohammad Hashim.

Abu Naser Chowdhury and Mohammad Selim surrendered to the court and were sent to jail by Judge Muhithul Haque Enam of the Chittagong Speedy Trial Tribunal in December 2016. In 2020, former High Court Division judge Nazrul Islam Chowdhury filed a bail application for Abu Naser Chowdhury on health grounds to the Appellate Division of the Bangladesh Supreme Court. The chief justice, in a four-member bench, ordered his treatment at a government hospital and return to prison after treatment but denied his bail application.

Saiful Islam was found innocent in the first trial was found guilty in a second trial. Judge Md Robiul Alam of the Chattogram Divisional Speedy Trial Tribunal found him guilty and sentenced him to life imprisonment on 22 September 2023.
