= High Commission of the Maldives, Dhaka =

Diplomatic mission of the Maldives in Dhaka, Bangladesh

High Commission of the Maldives, Dhaka ލަދޭޝްގައި ހުންނަ ދިވެހިރާއްޖޭގެ ހައިކޮމިޝަން
- Location: Bangladesh
- Address: House: 10, Road: 9, Baridhara Diplomatic Zone, Dhaka 1212
- Opened: 2008
- High Commissioner: Shiuneen Rasheed
- Website: maldivesbd.org

The High Commission of the Maldives in Bangladesh (Dhivehi: ބަންގްލަދޭޝްގައި ހުންނަ ދިވެހިރާއްޖޭގެ ހައިކޮމިޝަން, Bengali: মালদ্বীপের হাই কমিশন, ঢাকা, also known as the High Commission of the Maldives, Dhaka) is the overseas diplomatic mission of the Maldives located in Dhaka, the capital of Bangladesh.

== History ==
On 22 September 1978, diplomatic relations between Bangladesh and the Maldives were established.

For nearly 30 years after the establishment of diplomatic relations, there was no permanent High Commissioner or Ambassador Extraordinary and Plenipotentiary, but in 2008, Dr. Abdul Samad Abdullah arrived in Dhaka as the first permanent High Commissioner. In April 2014, the Maldivian government temporarily decided to close the High Commission in Dhaka due to financial constraints, but in July of the same year, the government reviewed this decision and decided to downsize rather than close it.

The mission was known as the Embassy of the Maldives in Bangladesh (Dhivehi: ބަންގްލަދޭޝްގައި ހުންނަ ދިވެހިރާއްޖޭގެ އެމްބަސީ, Bengali: মালদ্বীপের দূতাবাস, ঢাকা) from October 2016, when the Maldives left the Commonwealth, until February 2020. On 1 February 2020, when the Maldives returned to its status as a Commonwealth republic, this overseas mission reverted to the Office of the High Commission of the Maldives.

== Address ==
House: 10, Road: 9, Baridhara Diplomatic Zone, Dhaka 1212

== Ambassador ==
Shiuneen Rasheed, who has been serving as the High Commissioner since 3 July 2024.

== See also ==
- High Commission of Bangladesh, Malé
- Bangladesh–Maldives relations
