= M. Anwarul Islam =

M. Anwarul Islam is a retired rear admiral of the Bangladesh Navy. He is the former chairman of the Chittagong Port Authority.

== Career ==
Islam was promoted to Commodore in August 2008 along with Commodore Z. U. Ahmed, and Commodore Shakhawat Imran.

From 13 February 2011 to 26 February 2012, Islam was the chairman of Chittagong Port Authority. He oversaw the establishment of a BGMEA Help Desk at Chittagong Port. In November 2013, he was promoted to rear admiral along with Md Akthar Habib, Abu Shaker Md Abdul Baten, and Riazuddin Ahmed.

Islam was the executive vice president of the Chittagong Boat Club. He is a former senior directing staff of the National Defence College. He led a delegation of the college to Sri Lanka. He led a team of the college to East West Media and met with senior journalists Naem Nizam, and Imdadul Haq Milon.
