= Port of Payra =

- Interactive map of Port of Payra
- Location within Bangladesh

Location
- Country: Bangladesh
- Location: Kalapara, Patuakhali, Bangladesh
- Coordinates: 21.9890°N 90.2792°E
- UN/LOCODE: BGPAY

Details
- Opened: 13 August 2016
- Owned by: Payra Port Authority
- No. of piers: 3 piers at the entry gateway designed by Creato Design Research Lab Ltd and constructed by NDE.
- Draft depth: 6.3 metres (21 ft) (Note: The permissible draft is calculated based on tidal range at Kauar Char and all incoming/ outgoing vessels need to cross Kauar Char following the chart.)
- Land Area: 6,562 acres (26 Square Km)

Statistics
- Annual revenue: ▲US$32 million (2019)

The Port of Payra is a seaport on the shores of Bay of Bengal, located at Kalapara Upazila, Patuakhali District, Barishal Division, Bangladesh. It was established by an Act of Parliament in 2013. The port was officially inaugurated in 2016. It is located on the Ramnabad Channel near the Bay of Bengal. The port is undergoing several Development and expansion and the project is expected to be completed in 2020.

== Development ==
The development works include capital dredging of the port, the inauguration of eight ships, the first terminal, and the construction of a six-lane approach road and a bridge

=== Capital Dredging ===
The Payra Port Authority (PPA) signed a deal with the Belgium-based dredging company Jan De Nul (JDN) for capital and maintenance dredging of 75 kilometre long main channel of the under construction Payra seaport. In March 2023, JDN completed capital dredging at the port. Now Port Access Channel was declared open for commercial vessels up to a draft of 10.5 m. Country's foreign currency fund was to be used for the dredging work under the established Bangladesh Infrastructure Development Fund (BIDF) launched in 2021.

Maintenance dredging will keep Port of Payra accessible, and Jan De Nul will perform the maintenance dredging of the port in the next phase of the project. Three Trailing Suction Hopper Dredgers will be deployed to the Rabnabad Channel of Payra Port to fulfil the dredging requirements of the coming years.

== Background ==
Payra port was planned as Bangladesh's third seaport after the Chittagong port and the Mongla port, following the cancellation of the Sonadia deep seaport project in 2015.

In May 2016, a memorandum of understanding (MoU) was signed with Jan De Nul Group to dredge the Ramnabad canal. In October 2016, Bangladesh Navy was awarded the construction contract for a four-lane road connecting the port to the main highway in Patuakhali.

In December 2016, Bangladesh signed preliminary deals with Chinese companies China Harbour Engineering Company and China State Construction Engineering Corporation for developing three components of Payra seaport, implemented through a government-to-government basis. The plan reportedly faced opposition from India, Japan, and the United States. The same month, Bangladesh Railway signed an MoU with UK-based DP Rail to build a 240-kilometre rail line linking the planned Payra seaport to Dhaka under a PPP model.

In September 2017, Bangladesh University of Engineering and Technology (BUET) was approached to serve as the consultant for preparing the master plan and design of the seaport.

In December 2017, Commodore M Jahangir Alam, the chairman of PPA, signed an agreement with JDN for the capital dredging and the formation of a joint venture company with a 15-year validity period. That month, PPA expressed its plan to construct a multipurpose terminal through Indian financing, with the feasibility study expected to be completed within three months.

As of 2017, Payra was primarily a governmental route for import and export.

In January 2019, researchers shared findings questioning the feasibility of the deep sea project citing the excessive sedimentation at Payra Port channel.

In February 2019, PPA signed an agreement appointing a joint team of experts from BUET and the Dutch company Royal HaskoningDHV to prepare the detailed master plan for the overall development of the port within 18 months.

In 2021, it was reported that plans for a deep seaport at Payra were shelved and the port was to be developed as a regular seaport.
