= M. Shahjahan =

Mohammad Shahjahan
- Allegiance: Bangladesh
- Branch: Bangladesh Navy; Bangladesh Coast Guard
- Service years: 1984 - 2023
- Rank: Rear Admiral
- Commands: Senior Directing Staff (Navy) at National Defence College; Chairman, Chittagong Port Authority; Chairman, Mongla Port Authority; Deputy Director General, Bangladesh Coast Guard; Director of Blue Economy at Naval Headquarters.
- Awards: Noubahini Padak (NBP); Nou Parodorshita Padak (NPP)

Mohammad Shahjahan NBP, NPP, BCGMS, ndc, psc, M Phil is a retired two star admiral of Bangladesh who was formerly posted at National Defence College as Senior Directing Staff (Navy). Prior to that, he was the chairman of Chittagong Port Authority. Earlier he served as the chairman of the Mongla Port Authority. In previous he has also served as the deputy director general of Bangladesh Coast Guard. Member Blue Economy Cell

== Career ==
Shahjahan joined the Bangladesh Navy on July 24, 1984, and received his commission on January 1, 1987. He is the ex-officio chairman of the executive committee of Chattogram Bandar Mohila College.

On 11 March 2019, Shajahan was appointed the deputy director general of Bangladesh Coast Guard.

On 9 April 2020, Shahjahan was promoted to rear admiral from commodore after he was appointed chairman of Mongla Port Authority on 8 April. In January 2021, Shahjahan was appointed the chairman of Chattogram Port Authority from chairman of Mongla Port Authority. Shahjahan announced plans to build a Bay Container Terminal at Chittagong Port. He hosted Red Sea Gateway Terminal, a Saudi company, and the ambassador of Bangladesh to Saudi Arabia, Mohammad Javed Patwari, to attract Saudi investment in the Patenga Container Terminal. He expressed dissatisfaction at BM Container Depot Limited for their handling of the 2022 Sitakunda fire at their terminal. He introduced and oversaw the first direct container to arrive from Europe. He gave the concept of transforming Matarbari Deep Sea Terminal into a transshipment hub. He increased the length to 200 m and draft to10 m for the vessel entering Chittagong Port.
