= BNS Haji Mohshin =

Naval base of the Bangladesh Navy

BNS Haji Mohsin
- Dhaka Cantonment, Dhaka, Bangladesh

Site information
- Type: Naval base
- Controlled by: Bangladesh Navy

Site history
- Built: 1974
- In use: 1974 - present

Garrison information
- Current commander: Rear Admiral Abdullah Al Maksus

BNS Haji Mohsin is a naval base of the Bangladesh Navy. It was established after the Bangladesh War of 1971, and named in honour of Haji Muhammad Mohsin. The base is the principal logistics base of the Bangladesh Navy, and is located in the Dhaka Cantonment.

== Career ==
The Haji Mohsin currently serves as logistical and administrative support base to the headquarters of the Bangladesh Navy. About 3,000 personnel serve at Haji Mohsin. Some naval training is also provided here.

== See also ==
- List of active Bangladesh military aircraft
- List of active ships of the Bangladesh Navy
