= S. M. Abul Kalam Azad (admiral) =

Retired Bangladeshi admiral

Abul Kalam Azad BSP, NGP
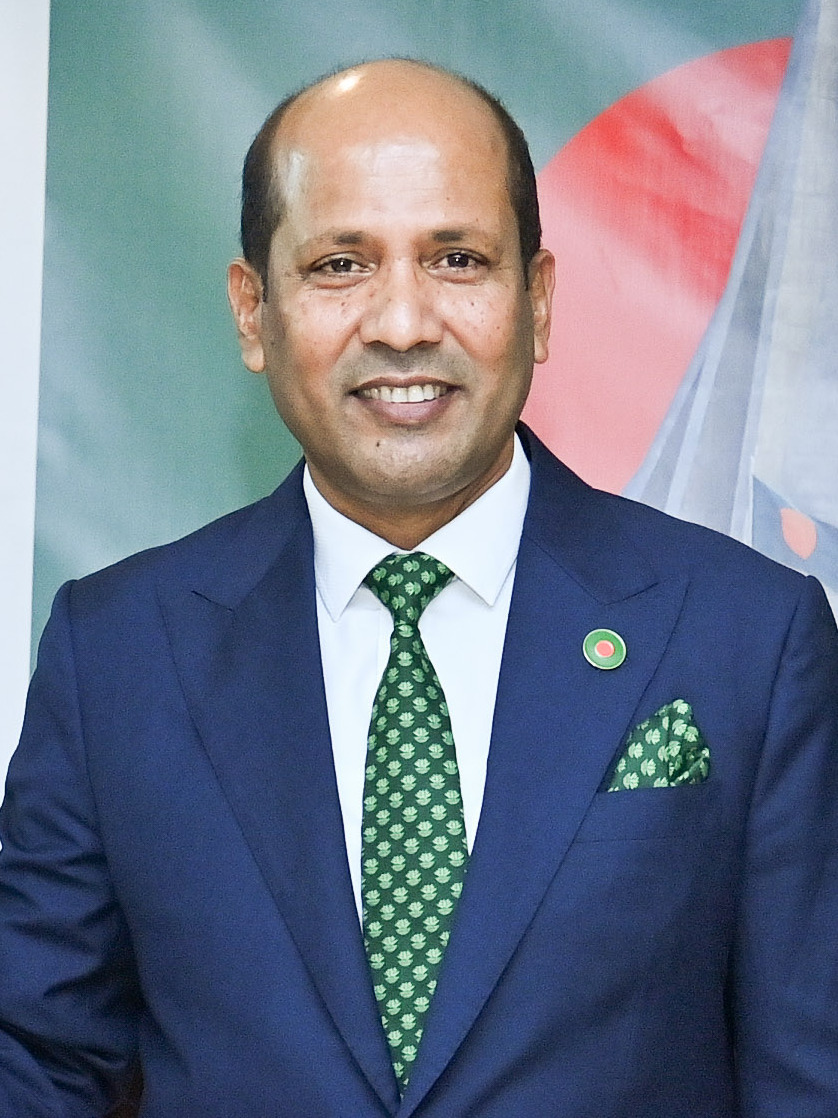
- Azad in Malé (2023)

Bangladesh High Commissioner to the Maldives
- In office 6 April 2022 – 10 August 2024
- President: Mohammad Abdul Hamid Mohammed Shahabuddin
- Prime Minister: Sheikh Hasina; Muhammad Yunus (acting)
- Preceded by: Mohammad Nazmul Hassan
- Succeeded by: Nazmul Islam

Personal details
- Born: 30 April 1967 (age 59) Kumarkhali, East Pakistan, Pakistan
- Spouse: Begum Naomee Nahreen Azad
- Children: 2
- Awards: Bisishtho Sheba Padak (BSP); Nou Gourobh Padak (NGP)

Military service
- Allegiance: Bangladesh
- Branch/service: Bangladesh Navy
- Years of service: 1987 – 2025
- Rank: Rear Admiral
- Commands: Commander, Dhaka Naval Area (COMDHAKA); Commander, BN Fleet (COMBAN); Chairman of Chattogram Port Authority; Chairman of Mongla Port Authority; Commander, Naval Administrative Authority Dhaka (ADMIN DHAKA)
- Battles/wars: UNIKOM; UNMEE; UNIFIL
- Police career
- Unit: Rapid Action Battalion
- Allegiance: Bangladesh
- Branch: Bangladesh Police
- Service years: 2006–2009
- Rank: Director

Sheikh Muhammad Abul Kalam Azad (Note: (G), BSP, NGP, ndc, psc, BN) (born 30 April 1967) is a retired two star officer of the Bangladesh Navy and former commander of the Dhaka Naval Area, an assignment he held before as Naval Administrator Dhaka. Prior to that, he was the high commissioner of Bangladesh to Maldives. He is also the former commander of the Bangladesh Navy fleet and chairman of Chittagong Port Authority and Mongla Port Authority.

== Early life and education ==
Azad was born in Mohendrapur village of Kumarkhali in then East Pakistan (now in Khulna Division, Bangladesh) on 30 April 1967, to Sheikh Osman Gani and Khadeza Begum. He is an alumnus of the pioneer batch of Pabna Cadet College. Azad joined the Bangladesh Navy in January 1985 and was commissioned in the executive branch as a gunnery officer on 1 July 1987. During his career, Azad attended Britannia Royal Naval College, Dartmouth, and finished his initial staff course at Royal Naval College, Greenwich, in the United Kingdom. He furthermore did a gunnery specialization course from the Turkish Naval Academy in Istanbul in 1996. Azad completed his command and staff course from Defence Services Command and Staff College in 2000 and National Defence College in 2016. He also completed an international humanitarian law course in India, and attended the Executive Decision Making seminar from Naval Postgraduate School in the United States.

== Military career ==
Azad commanded two warships, two offshore vessels, one small patrol boat, and the naval administrative authority at Dhaka. He was designated as staff officer of naval training, staff officer operations and officer in charge of field intelligence at BNS Titumir. Azad was also the officer in charge of Gunnery School at BNS Issa Khan.

Azad was also additional director for legal and media at the Rapid Action Battalion. At naval headquarters, Azad served as director of naval intelligence and drafting authority. Azad also served at the Armed Forces Division as director of civil and military relations in the rank of commodore. He was promoted to rear admiral in 2020 and designated as chairman of the Mongla Port Authority and then the Chittagong Port Authority. Subsequently returned to the navy to command the Bangladesh naval fleet in January 2021. On 23 February 2022, he was appointed as the high commissioner of Maldives, which he served until 10 August 2024, in which the Yunus Ministry detached him from the Ministry of Foreign Affairs in the aftermath of the non-cooperation movement of 2024.

Azad went to leave per retirement on 29 April 2025.
