= M. Shafiul Azam =

Rear Admiral in the Bangladesh Navy (b. 1964)

Shafiul Azam
- Allegiance: Bangladesh
- Branch: Bangladesh Navy
- Service years: 1985 – 2022
- Rank: Rear Admiral
- Commands: Assistant Chief of Naval Staff (Materiel); General Manager (Production) BN Dockyard
- Awards: Nou Utkorso Padak (NUP)
- Spouse: Rejina Begum
- Children: 2

Muhammad Shafiul Azam (Note: (E), NUP, ndc, psc) is a retired two-star officer of the Bangladesh Navy. He was the assistant chief of naval staff (materiel) and general manager (production) of BN Dockyard.

== Early life and education ==
Azam was commissioned on 15 April 1985 in the engineering branch of the Bangladesh Navy. Azam earned a bachelor's degree in naval architecture and marine engineering at Bangladesh University of Engineering and Technology (BUET) and a master's degree in defence studies from National University, Bangladesh. He further studied marine engineering at the Royal Naval Engineering College at Plymouth in the United Kingdom. He completed a staff course at Defence Services Command and Staff College and a second staff course at the Bundeswehr Command and Staff College in Germany.

== Career ==
Azam was the engineer officer on various navy ships and craft. He was also director of naval engineering. In November 2013, he was promoted to commodore. He was the general manager (production) of BN Dockyard and the general manager (planning) of Khulna Shipyard. For the United Nations Operation in Côte d'Ivoire (UNOCI), he was chief of civil-military coordination. He taught at the Bangladesh Naval Academy and the Defence Services Command and Staff College. He was also on the faculty of the National Defence College.

By November 2018, he was a rear admiral and assistant chief of naval staff (material). Azam went to leave per retirement on 13 October 2022.

== Personal life ==
Azam is married to Rejina Begum, a radiologist. The couple have a son and a daughter.
