= Chittagong Boat Club =

Boat club in Chittagong, Bangladesh

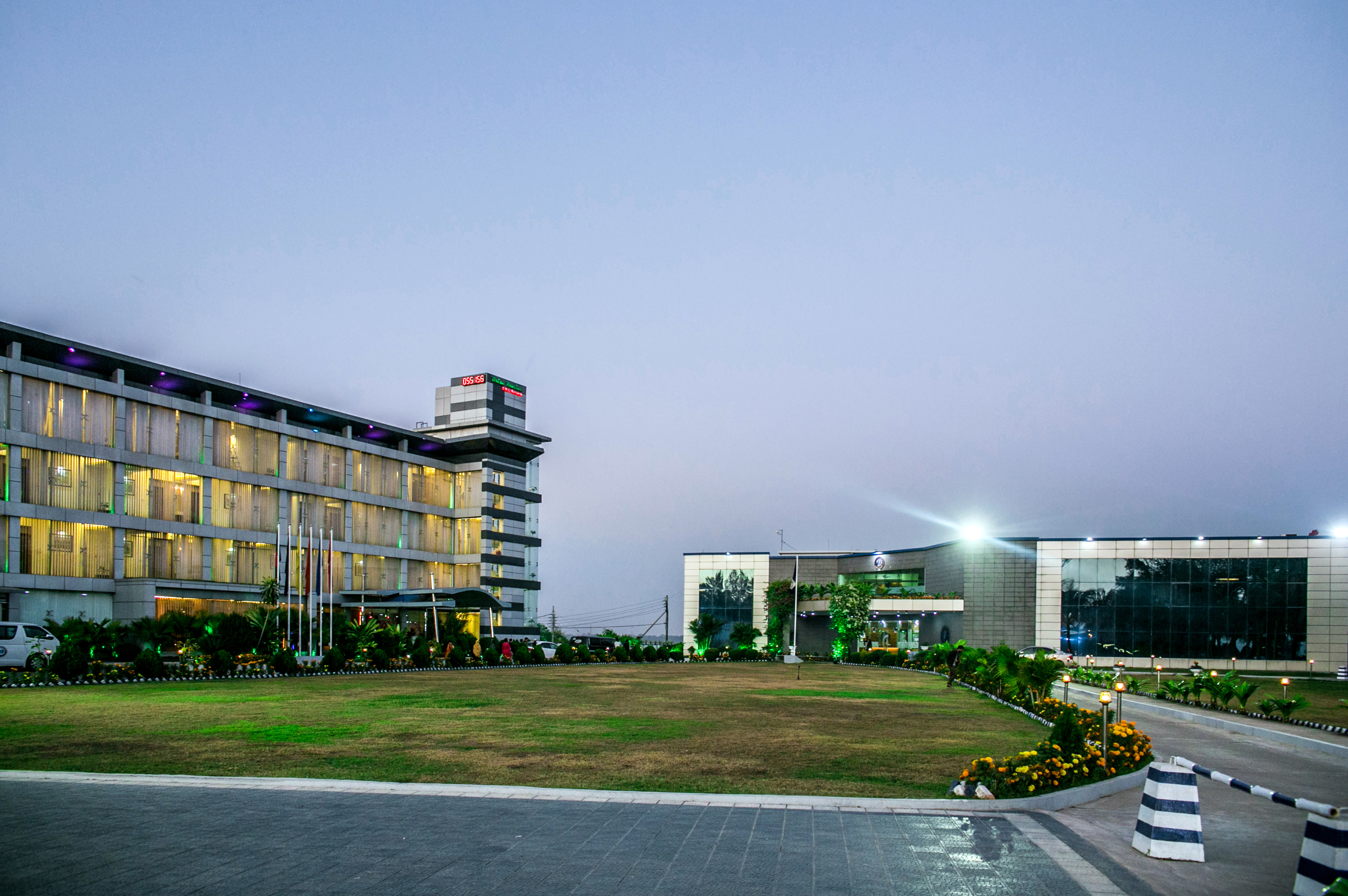
- Guest House, Chittagong Boat Club
- Nickname: CBC
- Formation: 1986; 40 years ago
- Founder: Sultan Ahmed
- Founded at: Chittagong
- Legal status: Active
- Purpose: Club facilities including aquatic sports
- Headquarters: Chittagong, Bangladesh
- Coordinates: 22.2651°N 91.8295°E
- Region served: Chittagong District
- Owner: Bangladesh Navy
- President: Admiral Mohammad Nazmul Hassan
- Website: www.chittagongboatclub.com

Chittagong Boat Club (CBC) is a boat club in the port city of Chittagong, Bangladesh. Since 1986 the club provided several facilities for the elite to enjoy the club facilities as an offshore tourist spot.

== Location ==
CBC is located on 2.1 acres (0.85 ha) of land beside Bangladesh Marine Academy Jetty at East Patenga in Chittagong. The Bangladesh Navy leased the land from the Chittagong Port Authority.

== History ==
The club was inaugurated by former Chief of Naval Staff Sultan Ahmed on 8 August 1990. In 2012, the CBC bought a river cruise ship from Western Marine Shipyard.

== Governing body ==
The Chief of Bangladesh Naval Staff would be the President of the club, and then Commodore Commanding Bangladesh Navy Flotilla (COMBAN) would be the vice president and later Commodore Commanding Chittagong (COMCHIT) became vice president for the club governing body.

== Gallery ==
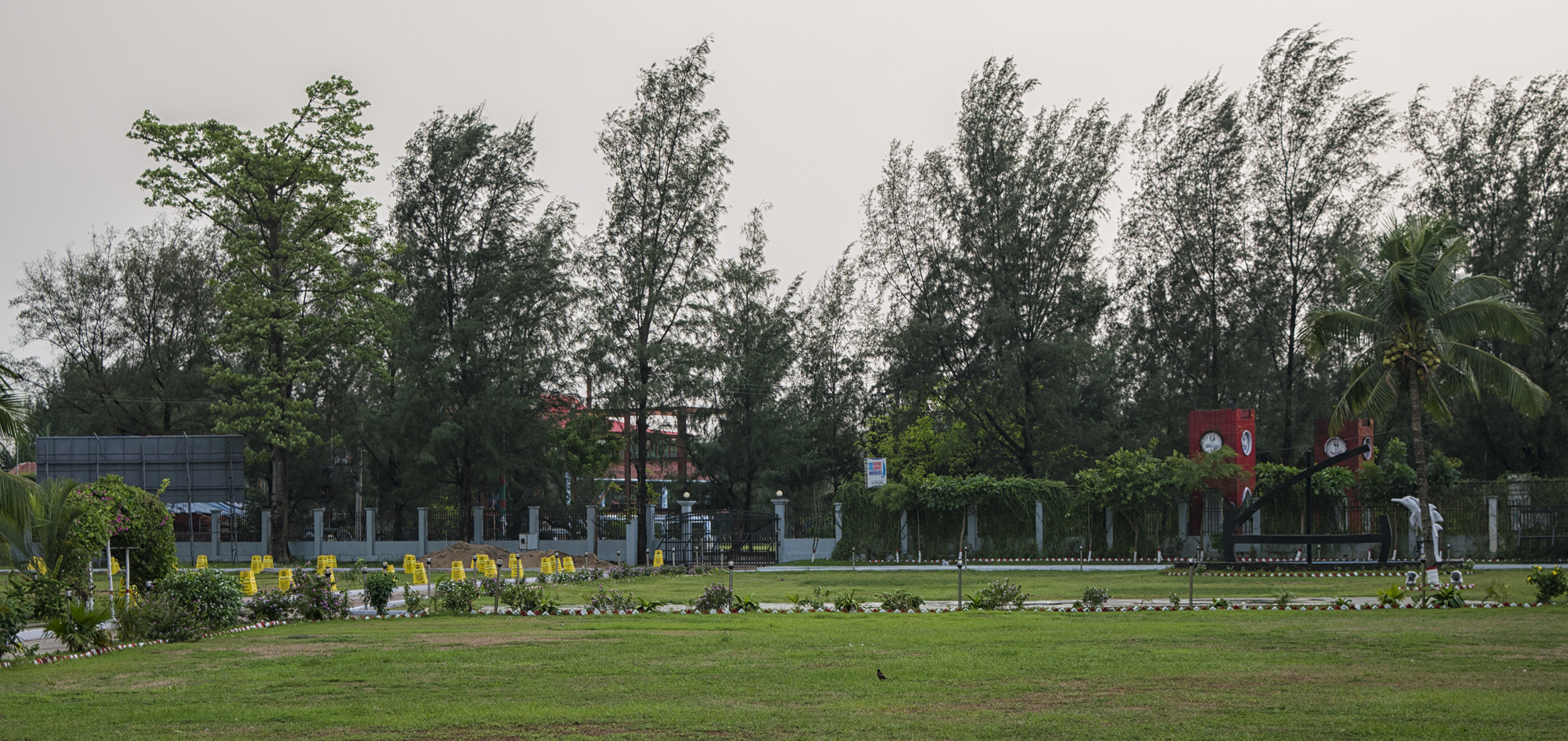
Chittagong Boat Club

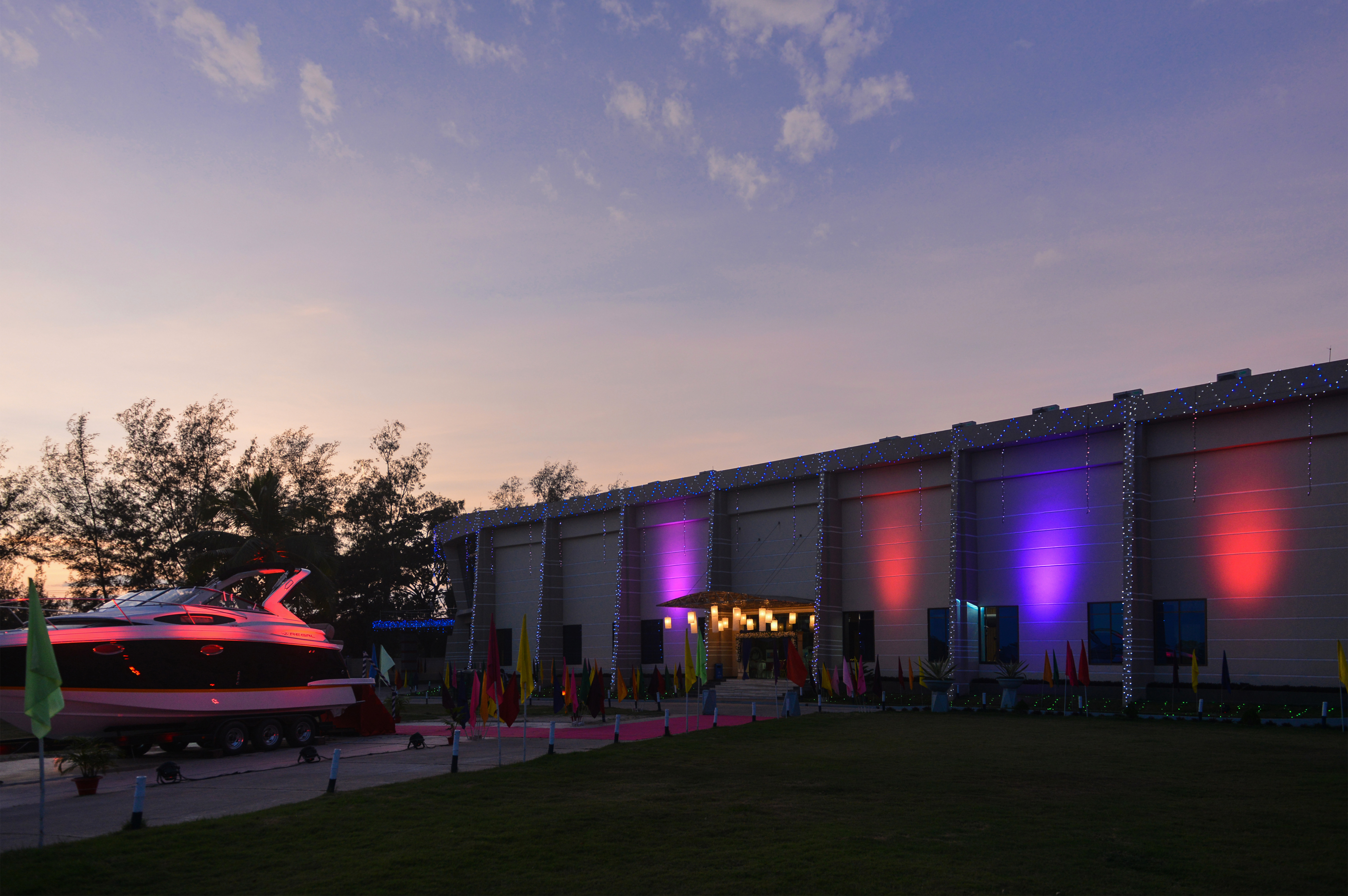
Convention Hall

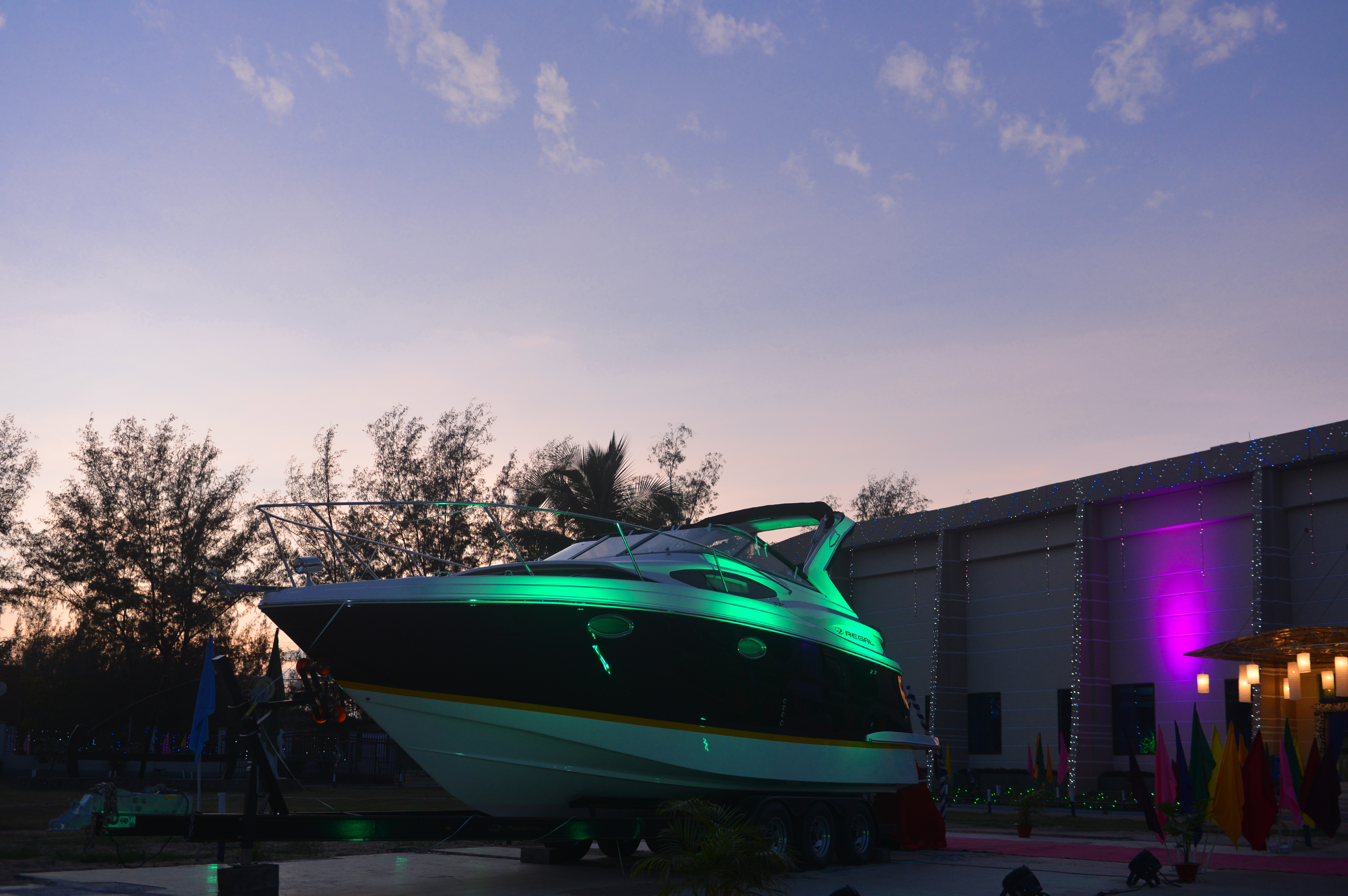
Convention Hall

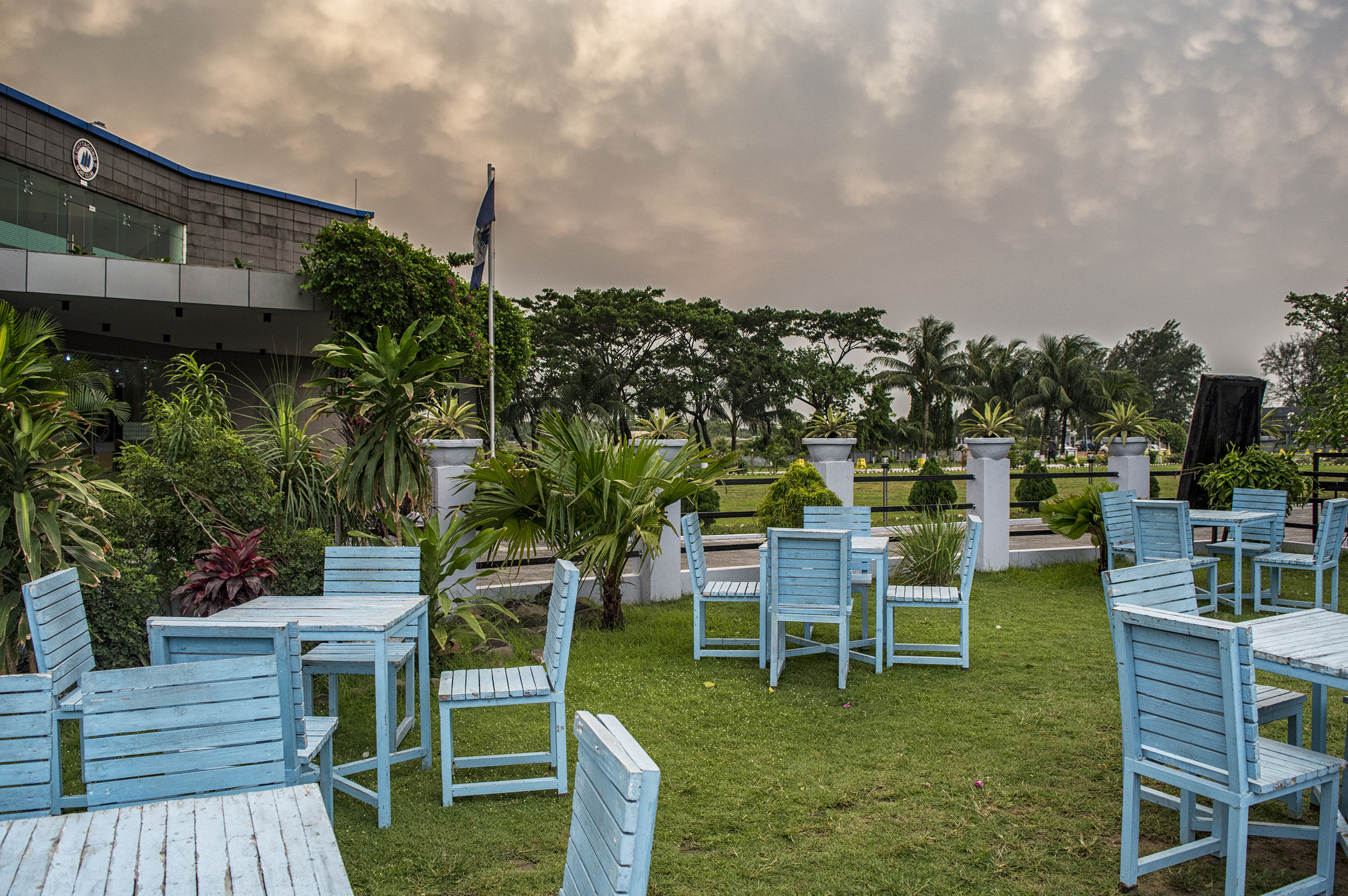
Chittagong Boat Club
