= Muhammad Nazmul Islam =

Bangladeshi diplomat

- নাজমুল ইসলাম
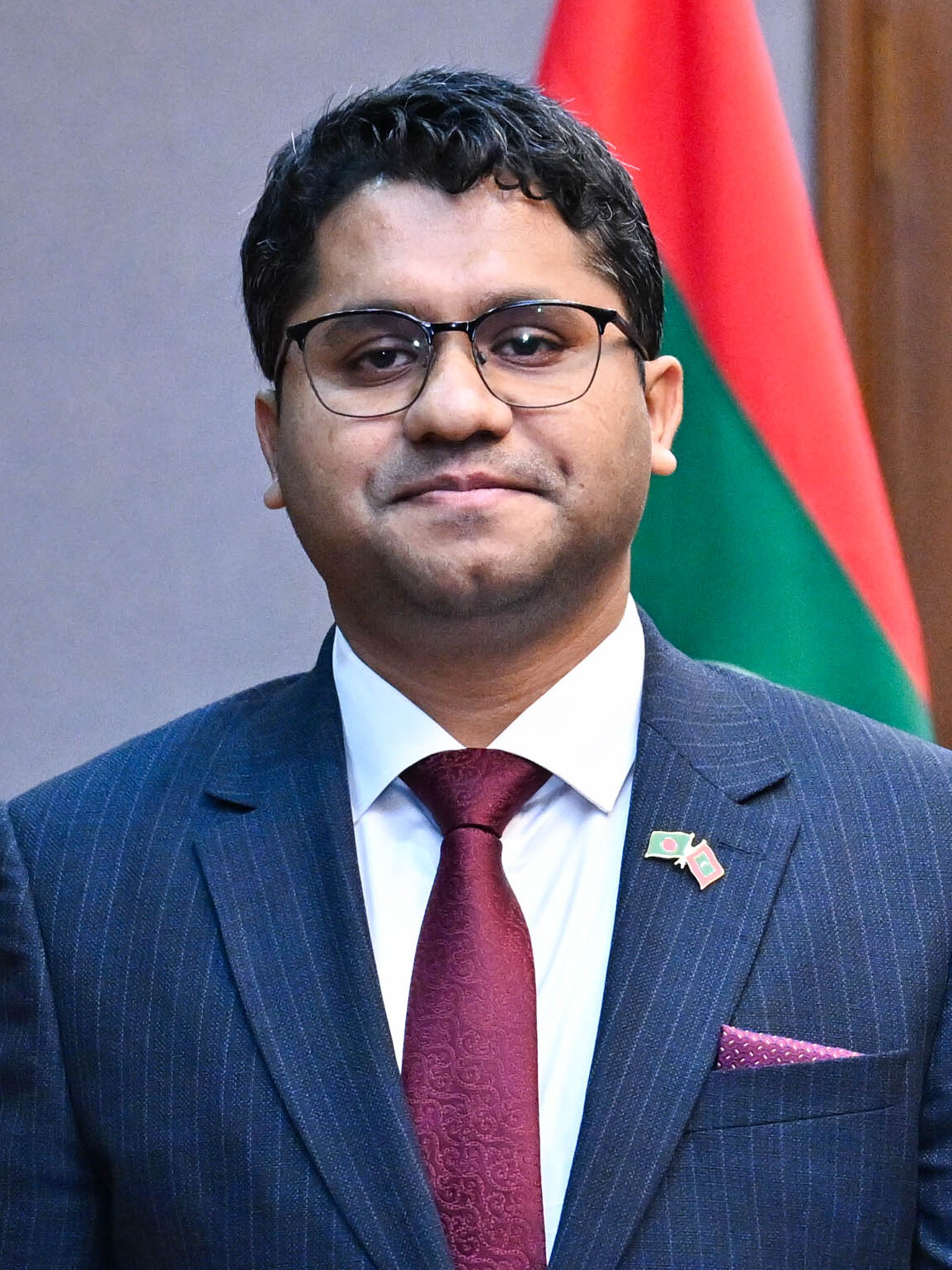
- Islam in 2025

Bangladesh High Commissioner to the Maldives
- In office 8 August 2025 – 30 June 2027
- President: Mohammed Shahabuddin
- Prime Minister: Muhammad Yunus (acting); Tarique Rahman
- Preceded by: Abul Kalam Azad

Personal details
- Education: University of Dhaka; Saarland University; George Mason University; Middle East Technical University; Ankara University; Ankara Yıldırım Beyazıt University (Ph.D.)
- Website: mnazmulislam.com

Muhammad Nazmul Islam is a Bangladeshi diplomat and political scientist who serves as the Bangladesh High Commissioner to the Maldives since August 2025.

== Background and education ==
Islam is native to Noakhali District. He earned in BS and MS from the Department of Peace and Conflict Studies at the University of Dhaka by 2014. He completed his second Masters of Law (LLM) from the Department of European and International Law at the Saarland University, Germany and third MSc (Coursework) from the Department of Conflict Analysis and Resolution at the George Mason University, USA. He earned his PhD in the Department of Political Science and Public Administration from Ankara Yildirim Beyazit University under Turkish Government and European Union Erasmus+ scholarships and a Postdoc in the Faculty of Communication from Ankara University.

== Career ==
After graduation, he joined Ankara Yıldırım Beyazıt University in the department of political science as an associate professor.

He previously worked with OIC, UNDP, ILO, Foreign Service Institute (FSI) of U.S. Department of State, Turkish Parliament, BRAC, and the University of Cambridge.

He taught post-graduate courses at the University of Greifswald, Saarland University, University of Trento, Bangladesh University of Professionals (BUP), Social Sciences University of Ankara, and Ankara University.

On 8 August 2025, the Ministry of Public Administration of Bangladesh government appointed Islam as the new High Commissioner of Bangladesh to the Republic of Maldives on a contractual basis for a period of two years.
