= Payra Port Authority =

Bangladeshi sea port

- Abbreviation: PPA
- Formation: 2013
- Headquarters: Patuakhali, Barisal, Bangladesh
- Location: Kalapara, Barisal, Bangladesh
- Region served: Bangladesh
- Official language: Bengali
- Chairman: Rear Admiral Syed Shaif-ul-Islam
- Website: ppa.gov.bd

Payra Port Authority is an autonomous statutory body in charge of the Port of Payra, the third seaport of Bangladesh located in Patuakhali.

== History ==
The port authority and the port were established on 19 November 2013 through the Payra Sea Port Act 2013. The port started commercial operations from August 2016 under the port authority. In 2016 China Harbour Engineering Company and China State Construction Engineering signed an agreement with the authority to improve the port. The deals were worth more than US$500 million and were signed in the Ministry of Shipping in Dhaka. The same year the port authority signed an agreement with Bangladesh Navy to build the approach road to the port.

In December 2017 Jan De Nul started proceeding on a 550 million euro dredging contract. Payra Port is the 3rd sea port of Bangladesh located in the general area between latitude 21^{o}15’- 22^{o}00’ North and longitude 90^{o}00’- 90^{o}30’.
