= Bangladesh Inland Water Transport Authority =

Authority who controls the inland water transport in Bangladesh

Agency overview
- Formed: October 31, 1958
- Preceding agency: East Pakistan Inland Water Transport Authority
- Type: Department
- Headquarters: BIWTA Bhaban, 141/143, Motijheel, Dhaka, Bangladesh
- Employees: 3076
- Annual budget: BDT 4,000 Million (2018-2019). Development budget =BDT 15,000 Million
- Ministers responsible: Shaikh Rabiul Alam, MP. Honorable Minister, Ministry of Shipping; Razib Ahsan, MP. Honorable State Minister, Ministry of Shipping
- Agency executive: Md Muhidul Islam, Chairman
- Website: biwta.gov.bd

The Bangladesh Inland Water Transport Authority (Bengali: বাংলাদেশ অভ্যন্তরীণ নৌপরিবহন কর্তৃপক্ষ) also known as BIWTA is the authority which controls the inland water transport in Bangladesh. It's also responsible for managing development and maintenance of inland water transport system.

== History ==
=== Formation ===
The department was first established in 1958 by the former East Pakistan government as East Pakistan Inland Water Transport Authority (EPIWTA). It was established for overall control, management, and development of inland water transports in the entire region. This agency was introduced on October 31, 1958, under the East Pakistan Inland water Transport Authority Ordinance 1958 (E.P. Ordinance, NO LXXV of 1958). Later the government appointed three constituted authority of this institution on November 4, 1958. After independence of Bangladesh this department was renamed Bangladesh Inland Water Transport Authority. Today, an appointed advisory committee advises in respect of all related development, maintenance, and operations of inland water transport and of inland waterways in Bangladesh.

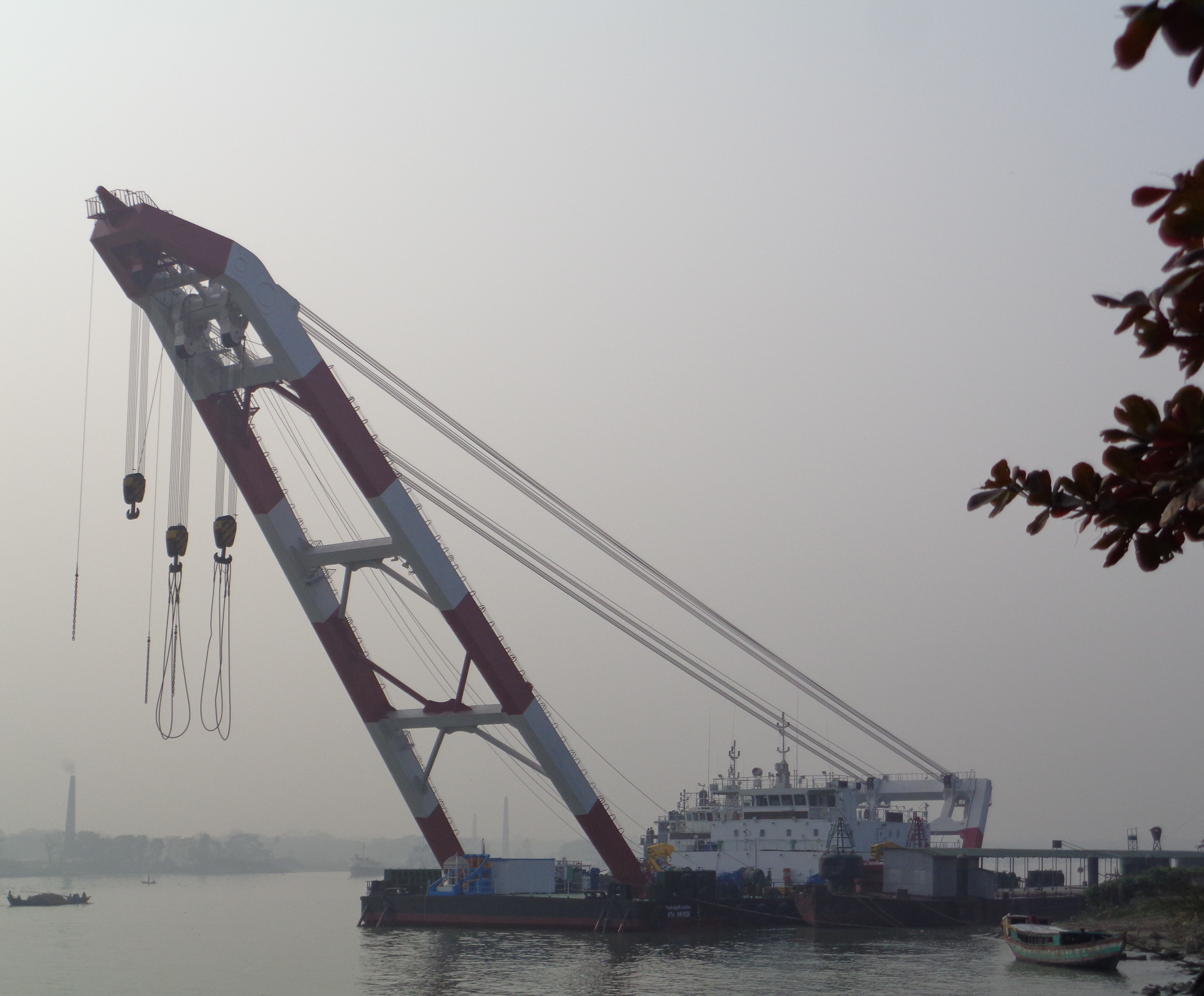
A salvage vessel of BIWTA

== Authority ==
BIWTA is headed by a chairman, who normally comes from the Bangladesh Navy. In previous it was a Grade 2 post, then a Naval officer, Rank Commodore, headed this organization. From 2 December 2025, the government uploaded an official order that from now, the BIWTA Chairman would become a Grade 1 official, equivalent to Rear Admiral rank in the Bangladesh Navy.

== List of Chairman ==
Chairman Grade 2

Chairman Grade 1
