= Chittagong Port Authority =

Government agency of Bangladesh

Coordinates: 22.3131°N 91.7995°E

Chattogram Port Authority
- চট্টগ্রাম বন্দর কর্তৃপক্ষ
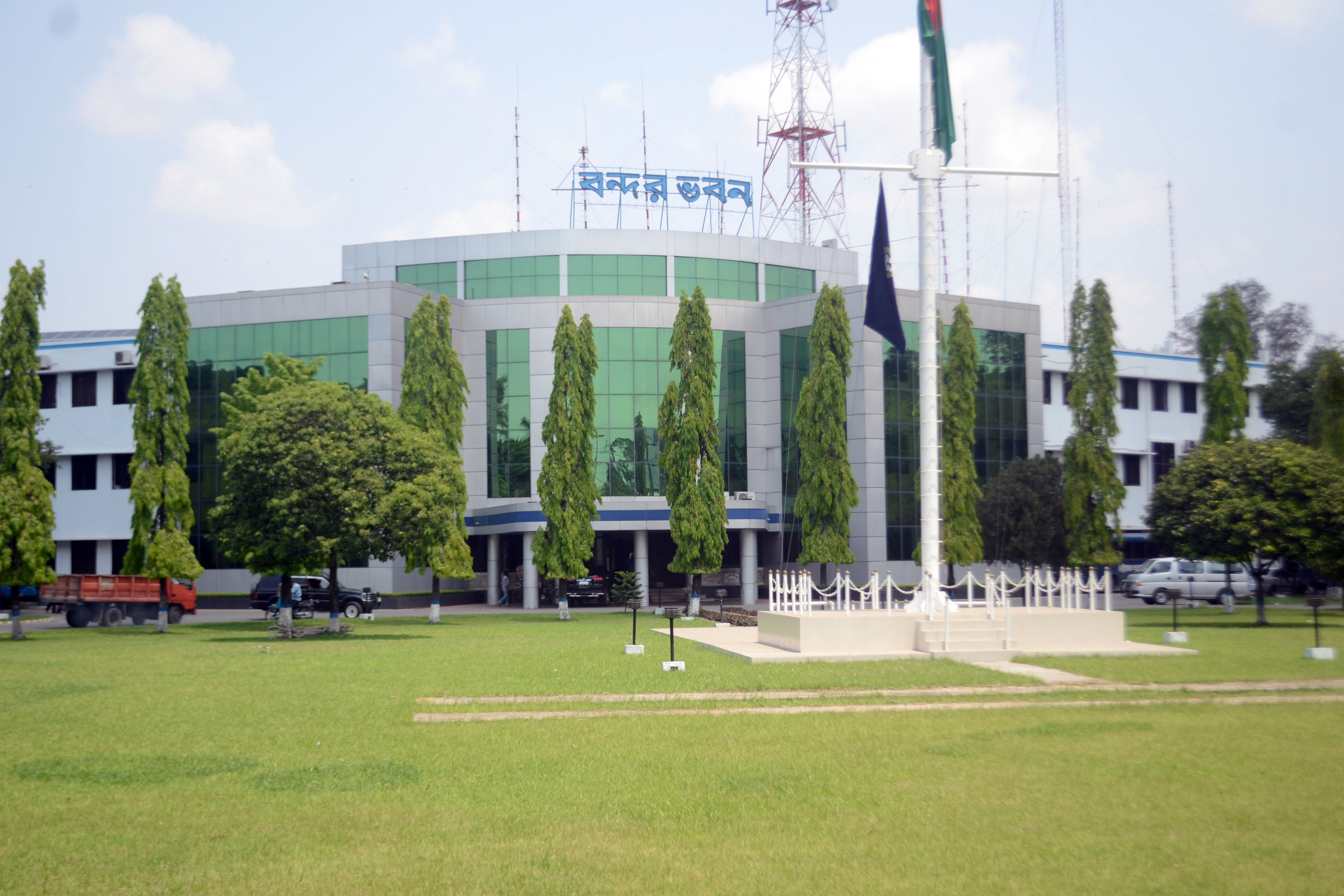
- Chattogram Port Authority building

Agency overview
- Formed: 1 October 1950; 75 years ago
- Jurisdiction: Port of Chittagong
- Headquarters: Bandar Bhaban, Po Box: 2013, Chattogram - 4100
- Agency executive: Rear Admiral S M Moniruzzaman, Chairman
- Parent department: Government of Bangladesh
- Parent agency: Ministry of Shipping
- Website: cpa.gov.bd

Chittagong Port Authority (CPA) is a government agency of Bangladesh responsible for the management, maintenance and governance of the country's major port of Chittagong, located in the city of Chittagong on the Karnaphuli River nine nautical miles from the shore of the Bay of Bengal of the Indian Ocean. The CPA is part of the Ministry of Shipping.

== Chairman of Chittagong Port Authority ==
Rear Admiral S M Moniruzzaman the current chairman of CPA.

== History ==
The port of Chittagong has been in operation since at least the 4th century BC, and in modern times was governed by Port Commissioners and the Port Railway following the Port Commissioner's Act of 1887 in British India. After the partition of India in 1947 and a subsequent rise in port traffic, the modern Chittagong Port Authority began its existence in 1960 as the Chittagong Port Trust. Due to continued expansion and lack of effective governance, after the Bangladesh Liberation War the Port Trust was granted semi-autonomous status within the government, and renamed to Chittagong Port Authority, in 1976.

== List of Chairmen ==
Name	Term start	Term end	Ref
Engineer M. A. Barry	1 October 1950	30 September 1961	
Major General S. M. Afzal	1 October 1961	17 June 1965	
Commodore Md Asie Al Avi	18 June 1965	31 December 1970	
Commodore I. H. Malik	1 January 1971	15 December 1971	
Gholam Kibria	16 December 1971	30 December 1977	
Engineer Mahmudul Islam	1 January 1978	12 February 1978	
Syed Mansur-ul Haque	13 February 1978	30 June 1981	
Engineer Mahmudul Islam	30 June 1981	25 February 1982	
Engineer Mahmudul Islam	26 February 1982	18 February 1984	
Nurul Momen Khan	19 February 1984	5 December 1985	
AZM Nasir Uddin	6 December 1985	18 April 1987	
Captain Sufi Ashraful Islam	19 April 1987	31 May 1987	
Captain S. Y. Kamal	1 June 1987	11 July 1988	
Engineer Md. Shahdat Hossain	12 July 1988	18 May 1990	
M. A. Kamal	19 May 1990	15 July 1990	
Captain M. Zakaria	16 July 1990	20 July 1991	
M. A. Kamal	21 July 1991	31 July 1992	
AKM Amanul Islam Chowdhury	1 August 1992	24 February 1994	
Captain Zahir Uddin Mahmood	25 February 1994	8 March 1994	
Engineer Md. Omar Hadi	9 March 1994	30 October 1994	
Captain Zahir Uddin Mahmood	1 November 1994	1 December 1994	
Engineer Md. Omar Hadi	2 December 1994	23 March 1995	
Captain Zahir Uddin Mahmood	24 March 1995	25 June 1997	
Zulfiquer Haider Chowdhury	26 June 1997	21 September 1997	
Md. Rezwanul Haque	22 September 1997	12 May 1999	
Commodore Ghulam Rabbani, psc, BN	12 May 1999	25 July 2002	
Commodore Zulfiqar Ali	25 July 2002	24 July 2003	
AMM Shahadat Hossain	25 July 2003	15 November 2006	
Md. Mosleh Uddin	10 May 2007	24 May 2007	
Captain Yahaya Syed	16 November 2006	10 May 2007	
Commodore M. Farooque	24 May 2007	9 July 2008	
Commodore Riaz Uddin Ahmed	9 July 2008	12 February 2011	
Commodore M. Anwarul Islam	13 February 2011	26 February 2012	
Commodore Mohammad Nizamuddin Ahmed	26 February 2012	11 March 2012	
Rear Admiral Mohammad Nizamuddin Ahmed	12 March 2012	24 January 2016	
Commodore Zulfiqur Aziz	24 January 2016	31 March 2016	
Rear Admiral Mohammad Khaled Iqbal	31 March 2016	29 January 2018	
Commodore Zulfiqur Aziz	29 January 2018	6 November 2018	
Rear Admiral Zulfiqur Aziz	7 November 2018	12 April 2020	
Rear Admiral S.M Abul Kalam Azad	12 April 2020	31 January 2021	
Rear Admiral M Shahjahan	31 January 2021	2 May 2023	
Rear Admiral M Sohail	2 May 2023	10 August 2024	
Rear Admiral S. M. Moniruzzaman	11 August 2024		

== Leadership and management ==
The port authority is governed by a management board consisting of the Chairman and four Members responsible for different operational areas. As of January 2026, the board comprises:

Position	Name	Rank/Designation
Chairman	S. M. Moniruzzaman	Rear Admiral, OSP, ndc, ncc, psc
Member (Harbour & Marine)	Ahamed Amin Abdullah	Commodore, BSP, psc, BN
Member (Admin & Planning)	Md Mahbub Alam Talukder	Additional Secretary
Member (Finance)	Md Mahbub Alam Talukder	Additional Secretary
Member (Engineering)	Md. Mazharul Islam Jewel	Commodore (E), psc, BN

== Gallery ==
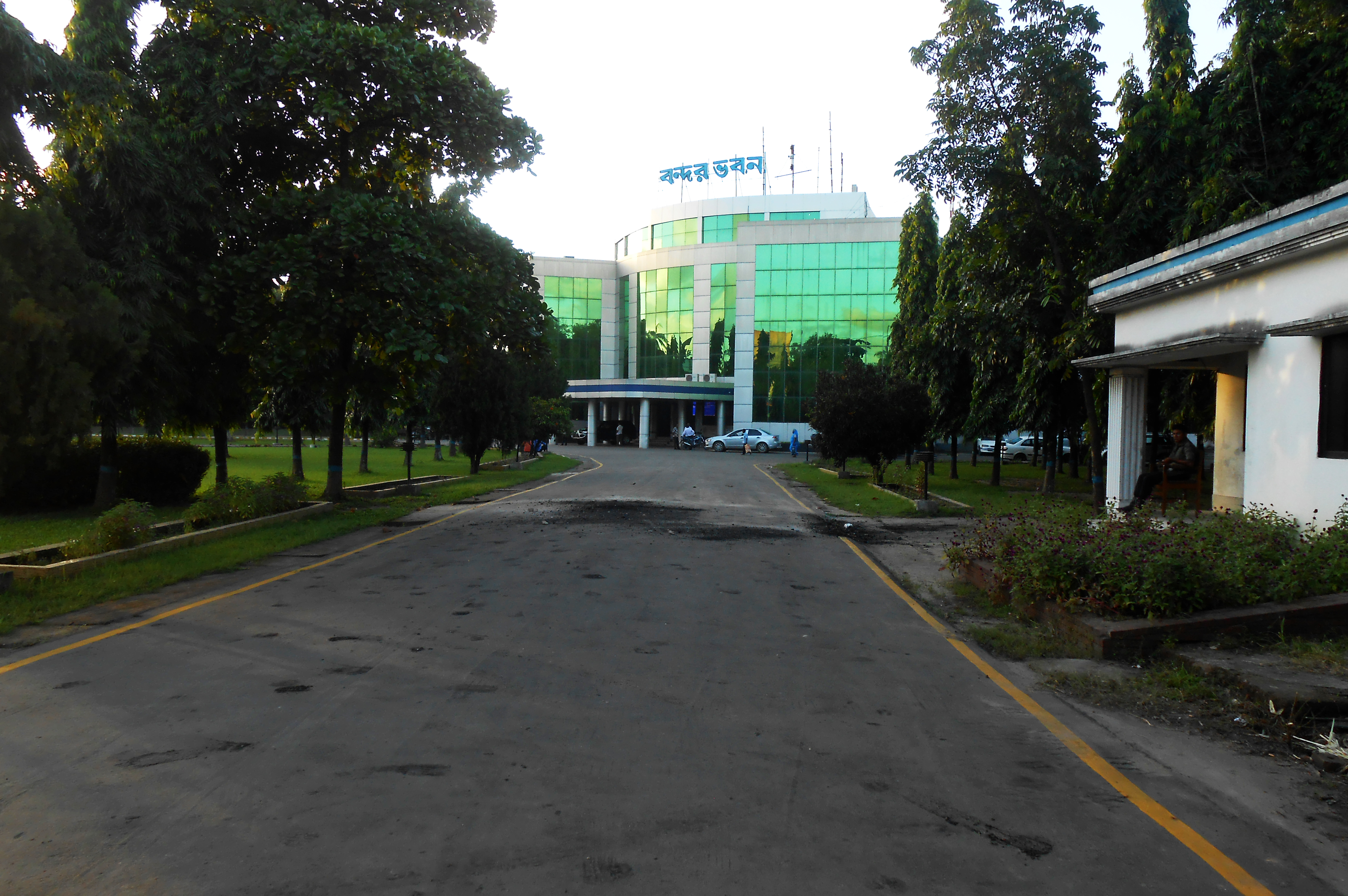
Entrance of Bandar Bhaban

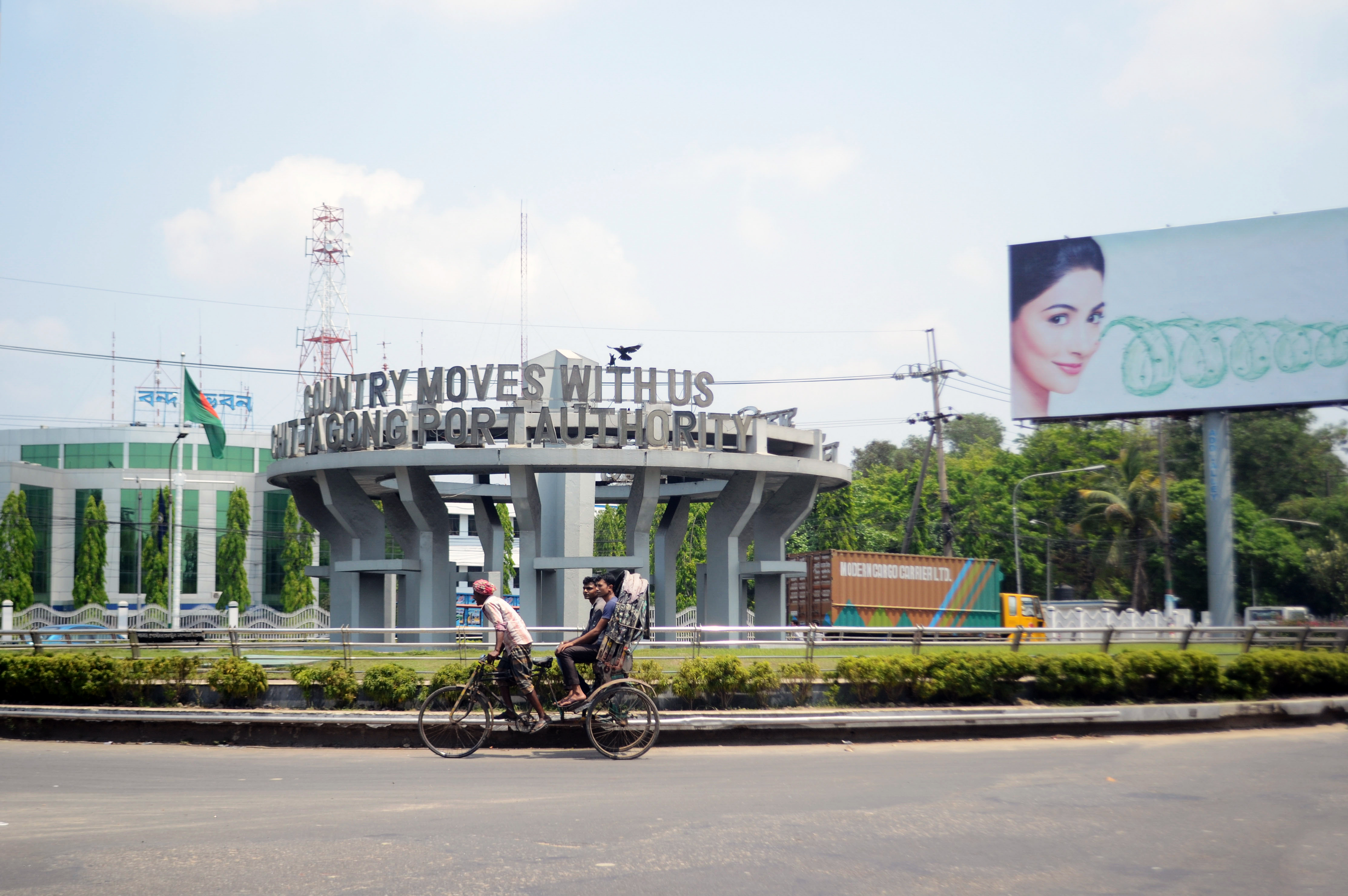
Chittagong Port Authority Circle

== See also ==
- Government of Bangladesh
- Transport in Bangladesh
- Bangladesh Marine Fisheries Academy
