= BNS Titumir =

- বানৌজা তিতুমীর
- Khalishpur, Khulna, Bangladesh

Site information
- Type: Naval base
- Controlled by: Bangladesh Navy

Site history
- Built: 1976
- In use: 1974 - Present

Garrison information
- Current commander: Rear Admiral Golam Sadeq

BNS Titumir (Bengali: বানৌজা তিতুমীর) is a naval base of the Bangladeshi Navy, founded after the Bangladesh Liberation War of 1971, and located in Khulna. Till 1971 it was titled as PNS Titumir as Bangladesh was then part of Pakistan.

== Career ==
Naval base Titumir is currently under the command of the Commander Khulna Naval Area. About 2500 personnel serve at BNS Titumir, which is one of the largest bases in the Bangladesh Navy. It also provides some naval training. Some training schools located here are

- School of logistics and management: Providing relative Bachelor degrees under the Bangladesh National University.
- New Entry Training school (NET school): Providing initial training for sailors under the naval syllabus.

== See also ==
- List of active ships of the Bangladesh Navy
- Titumir
