= School of Logistics and Management (SOLAM) =

- Part of Khulna Naval Area
- Lobonchora, Khulna Division.
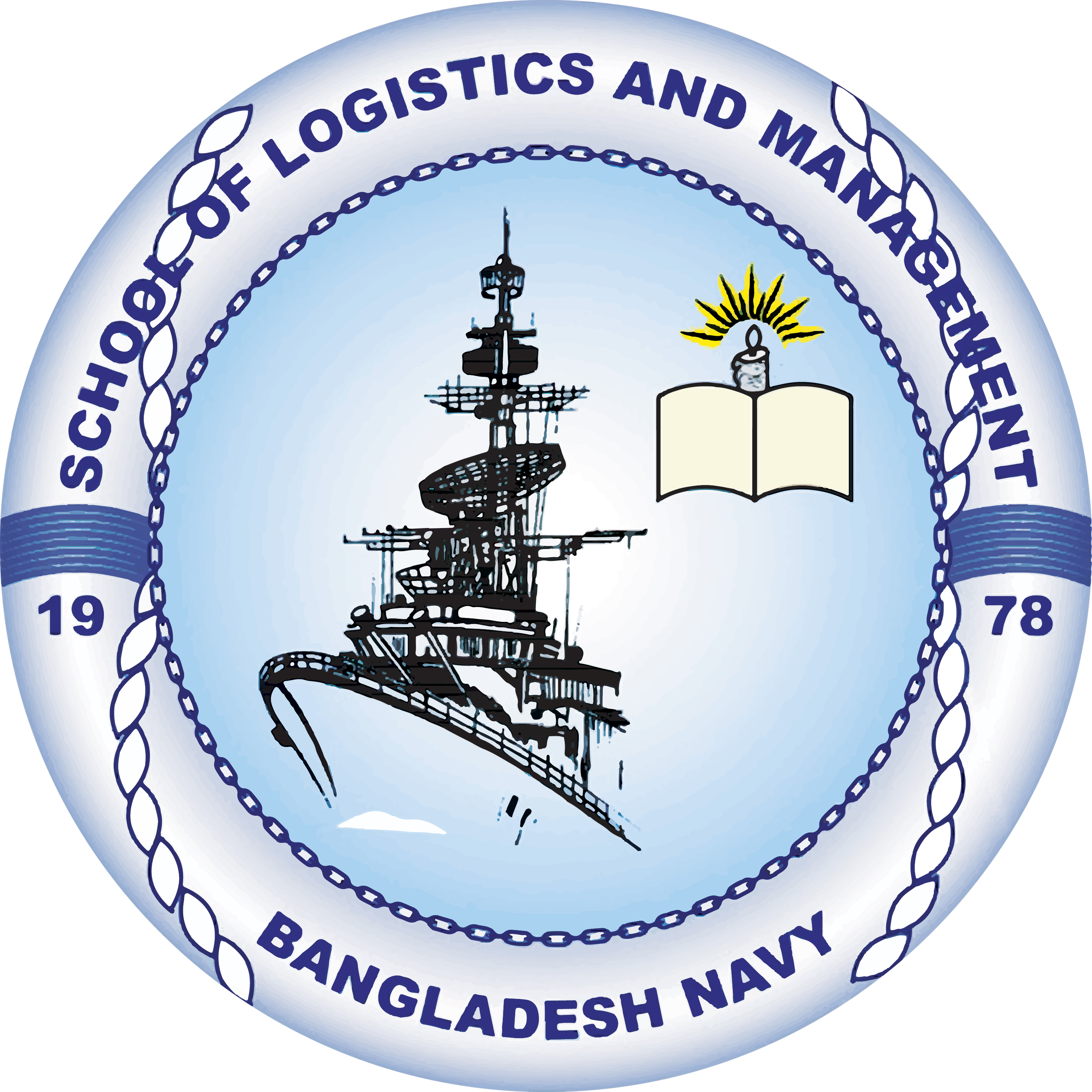

Site information
- Type: Naval Base
- Owner: Bangladesh Navy
- Controlled by: Commander Khulna Naval Area
- Website: infotrainingbd.com/bangladesh_navy/solam.php

Location
- Coordinates: 22.7722°N 89.5787°E

Site history
- Built: 2011

The School of Logistics and Management (SOLAM) is the only logistics training base of the Bangladesh Navy.

== History ==
SOLAM, formerly known as School of Supply and Secretariat (S&S) was established in 1976 under naval base BNS Shaheed Moazzem. Subsequently, the unit was shifted to BNS Titumir in 1978. Later the School of Supply and Secretariat (S&S) renamed as the School of Logistics & Management (SOLAM) at its current location Lobonchora, Khulna in 2008. In view of the increase in the number of logistics personnel in Bangladesh Navy, the logistic training base was inaugurated on 5 March 2011 by the Prime Minister Sheikh Hasina.

== Functions ==
The main functions of this logistic base is to provide modern and effective training to the officers and sailors of logistics branch of Bangladesh Navy by fulfilling the requirement of Bangladesh Navy.

== See also ==
- List of ships of the Bangladesh Navy
- Bangladesh Navy Hydrographic & Oceanographic Center
