= Bangladesh Shipping Corporation =

State-owned autonomous corporation in Bangladesh

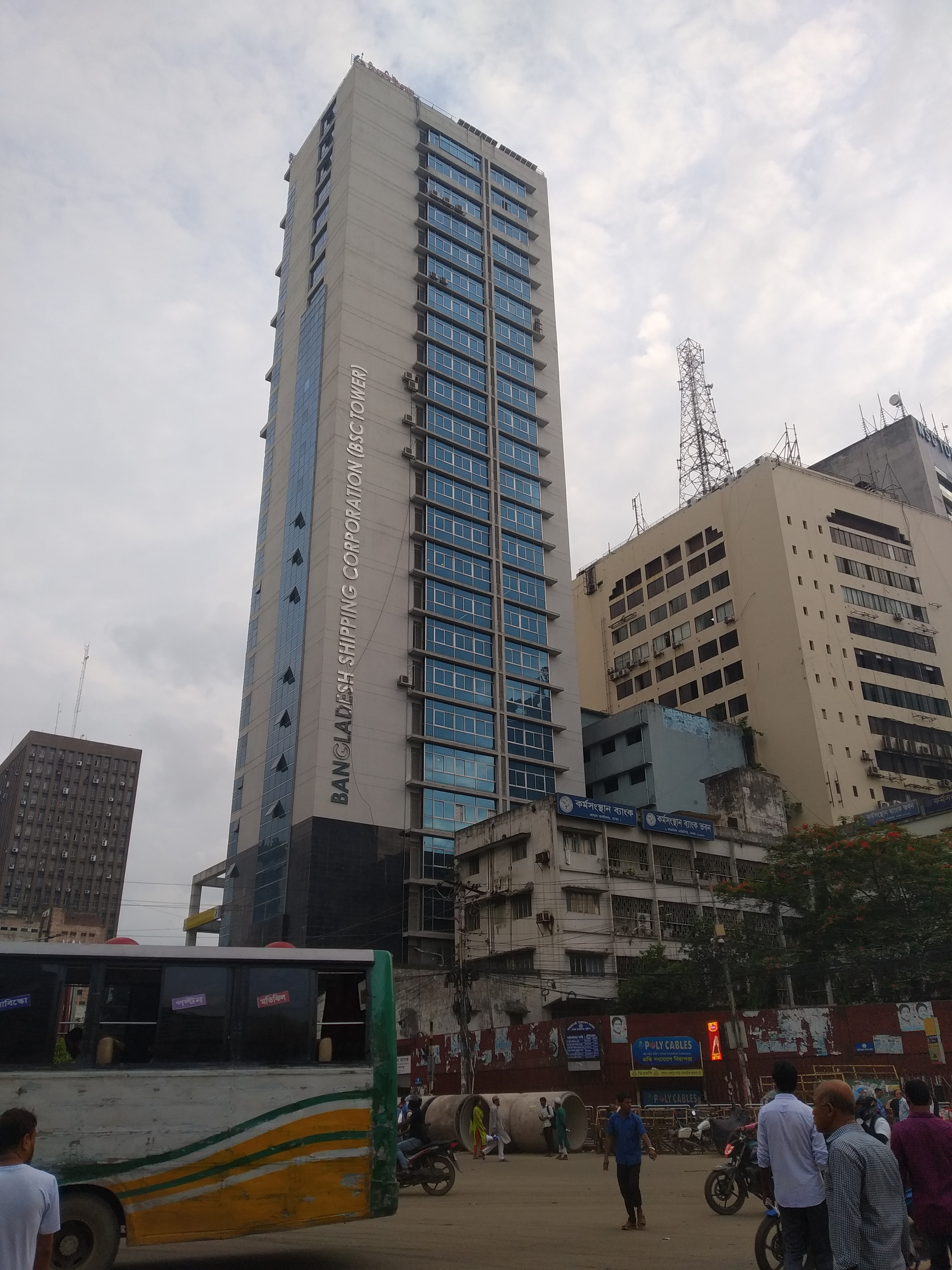
- Bangladesh Shipping Corporation headquarter
- Formation: 5 February 1972; 54 years ago
- Headquarters: Dhaka, Bangladesh
- Region served: Bangladesh
- Official language: Bengali
- Managing Director: Commodore Mahmudul Malek
- Revenue: ▲US$32.93 million (2018)
- Website: Bangladesh Shipping Corporation

Bangladesh Shipping Corporation is a state-owned, autonomous corporation in Bangladesh. It owns a number of ships and oil tankers, and also charters sea-going vessels from other operators. The vessels are used to carry ready-made garments and other export items, and also to import crude oil from Saudi Arabia and UAE.

== History ==
In 1971, Pakistan's National Shipping Corporation took all the merchant fleet. Beginning in 1972, Bangladesh inherited no merchant vessel registered under its flag. Sheikh Mujibur Rahman realized the importance of the shipping sector at that time. On 5 February 1972, he established 'Bangladesh Shipping Corporation (BSC) under the President Order no-10 of 1972. On 10 June of the same year, BSC acquired the first national ship 'Banglar Doot' which was the first registered ship in independent Bangladesh. Soon after, BSC acquired 'Banglar Sampad'. It purchased its first ship in 1974. The ship was named Banglar Doot (Ambassador of Bengal). As of 2001, the corporation owned 13 ships, two of which are oil tankers.

In March 2022, Bangladesh Shipping Corporation requested $22.4M from its insurer, Sadharan Bima Corporation, after its cargo ship Banglar Samriddhi was hit by a missile while docked at the Olvia port in Ukraine during the Russian invasion of Ukraine.

== Headquarters ==
The main headquarters is in the port city of Chittagong. There are branch offices in both Dhaka and Khulna. Although it is a semi-autonomous body, the minister of shipping of the Government of Bangladesh acts as the chairman of the corporation. The corporation also run its own modern marine workshop in Chittagong.
