= BN Dockyard =

Bangladesn Naval base in Chattagram

Bangladesh Naval Dockyard
- Part of Bangladesh Navy
- Patenga, Chattagram
- Seal of the Commodore Superintendent Dockyard

Site information
- Type: Naval base
- Owner: Bangladesh Armed Forces
- Controlled by: Bangladesh Navy
- Website: http://csd.navy.mil.bd/

Site history
- Built by: BN DOCKYARD CHATTAGRAM
- In use: 1980–present

Garrison information
- Current commander: Rear Admiral Ruhul Minhaz

Bangladesh Navy (BN) Dockyard is a dockyard of the Bangladesh Navy located in Patenga, Chattagram which provides technical support to Bangladesh Navy. BN Dockyard is solely responsible for keeping operational of Bangladesh Navy warships by providing continuous repair and maintenance support through its skilled manpower and different workshops.

== History ==
BN Dockyard has started its journey with a small base workshop and a slipway after liberation of Bangladesh. There were only four small workshops, namely platter shop, diesel engine workshop, machine shop, and Electrical workshop. First missile guided Frigate BNS UMAR FAROOQ joined BN fleet in 1977. Initially, frigates were sent to Singapore for docking, which involved huge amount of money. Gradually the necessity of owning a dock felt strongly. Consequently, Floating Dock SUNDARBAN purchased from Yugoslavia in 1980. Since then Repair facility has grown its manifold over the years.

Over the last four decades, the Bangladesh Navy is being transformed from a small navy into a three-dimensional brown water Navy by adding Naval Aviation and Submarine Arms including several modern ships having state of the art machinery, guns, sensors, and systems. Commodore Superintendent Dockyard is the premier organization that plays a key role in maintaining this growing navy by providing invaluable technical support.

== Functions ==
To ensure maximum operational availability of BN Fleet by repair and maintenance support and to contribute in technical advancement to keep pace with modernization of ships/crafts. Besides the operational roles of BN Dockyard is to provide repair and maintenance support for hull and misc fittings, mechanical machinery, and equipment, electrical and radio electrical machinery equipment and system, combat system, naval guns, small arms and web equipment, calibration of various equipment and gauges and docking naval ships. Additionally, it plays few special roles, like organizing and storing spare parts, materials for repair and maintenance, it also provides FW and electricity to BN ships, maintenance of pontoons and jetties for berthing, repair and maintenance of all workshop machinery as well as provide crane and utility vehicle support. BN Dockyard is the sole technical adviser to all the naval agencies of Bangladesh Navy.

== Organization ==
BN Dockyard got national standard from prime minister of Bangladesh in 2018. This org is headed by the Area Superintendent Dockyard or in short ASD rank of Rear Admiral, who works directly under the Chief of Naval Staff (Bangladesh). The whole range of technical activities in BN Dockyard and the administration of industrial workers are directly controlled by the ASD, who executes it through four senior ranking Managers, namely General Manager Planning and Estimating GM (P&E), General Manager Production GM (Prod), General Manager Administration GM (Admin), General Manager Yard service GM (YS) and in addition Director Centre For Naval Research & Development and Director Identification of Friend & Foe Centre. CSD also exercises administrative control over BN Dockyard, other units like BNFD SUNDARBAN, and the Naval Armament Stores Depot through his respective Commanding Officers and Officer-In-charges.

== Units ==
BN Dockyard has 24 different workshops which are distributed under four sections, each headed by a Deputy General Manager namely

- Hull and Miscellaneous
- Mechanical
- Electrical
- Radio Electrical and Ordnance

== See also ==
- Bangladesh Navy
- Chittagong Dry Dock Limited
- Dockyard and Engineering Works Limited
- Khulna Shipyard
