= Mongla Port Authority =

Government agency of Bangladesh

- Abbreviation: MPA
- Formation: 1987
- Legal status: Active
- Headquarters: Mongla, Bagerhat, Khulna, Bangladesh
- Region served: Bangladesh
- Chairman: Rear Admiral Arif Ahmed Mostafa
- Affiliations: Ministry of Shipping
- Website: mpa.gov.bd

Mongla Port Authority is an autonomous organisation responsible for Mongla Port and is located in Mongla, Bagerhat, Bangladesh. They also got a administrative head office in Khulna The Chairman of Mongla Port Authority is Rear Admiral Shaheen Rahman, nup, ndc, psc.

== History ==
The port authority was established on 1987. In 2013, Mongla port awarded the contract for 5 vessels from Timblo Drydocks in Goa, India. Mongla Port Authority Chief Engineer Altaf Hussain was under investigation of Bangladesh Anti Corruption Commission for alleged grafts in awarding contracts. The same year the port authority signed a US$250 million deal with China for the modernisation of the Port. Dredging Corporation of India won a 1 billion rupee contract to dredge Mongla port from Mongla Port Authority in 2017.

== Port management ==
Mongla is the 2nd sea port of Bangladesh. The port is under the administrative control of the ministry of shipping, Govt. of the people's republic of Bangladesh. Chairman is the Chief Executive of the port authority. There is a board consisting of a chairman and three members i.e. Member (Finance), Member (Harbour & Marine), Member (Engineering & Development). The Board formulates the policy of operation, administration, finance & development of the port. there are 12 (Twelve) Departments to carry out day-to-day work of the authority. All activities of the port are controlled by the Ministry of shipping and monitoring by high powered parliamentary & Advisory Committees. The authority will recruit some personnel to speed their work in the port.
