= Muhammad Ziaul Hoque =

Bangladeshi admiral

Muhammad Ziaul Hoque OSP

18th Director General of Bangladesh Coast Guard
- In office 29 September 2024 – 10 September 2026
- President: Mohammed Shahabuddin
- Prime Minister: Muhammad Yunus (chief adviser); Tarique Rahman
- Preceded by: Mir Ershad Ali
- Succeeded by: Md Moinul Hassan

Personal details
- Awards: Oshamanno Sheba Padak (OSP); CNS Commendation

Military service
- Allegiance: Bangladesh
- Branch/service: Bangladesh Navy; Bangladesh Coast Guard
- Years of service: 1989–present
- Rank: Rear Admiral
- Commands: Director General of Bangladesh Coast Guard; Commander Chattogram Naval Area, COMCHIT; Senior Directing Staff (navy) at National Defence College; Commodore Naval Aviation, COMNAV; Managing Director of Bangladesh Shipping Corporation; Director of Naval Operations; Commander, BNS Shaheed Moazzem; Commander, BNS Ulka; Senior Instructor (Navy), Defence Services Command and Staff College (DSCSC); Commander, Operational Sea Training Guide; Commander, BNS Umar Farooq

Muhammad Ziaul Hoque (Note: OSP, ndc, afwc, psc, MPhill) is the 18th director general of the Bangladesh Coast Guard. He is the former managing director of the Bangladesh Shipping Corporation.

== Education ==
Hoque joined the Bangladesh Naval Academy in 1987. He was commissioned on 1 January 1989 as torpedo anti-submarine coordinating (TAS) officer. In 1991, he completed a naval officers' course in Germany. He was also trained at the Bangladesh Public Administration Training Centre, National Defence College, India, Armed Forces Command and Staff College of Saudi Arabia, and the Defence Services Command and Staff College. He completed two courses on submarines from India and Turkey as well.

== Military career ==
Hoque commanded five warships including a Frigate, two patrol craft, one minesweeper craft, BNS Shaheed Moazzem and BNS Ulka under the Chittagong naval area. He was also an instructor at the Torpedo Anti-Submarine School and the Defence Services Command and Staff College. He was the training coordinating officer of the Bangladesh Naval Academy. He served as Commander of Operational Sea Training Guide, Staff Officer for operations and planning and Director Operations at Naval Headquarters. He also served as a military observer in United Nations Operation in Côte d'Ivoire.

Hoque was the director of naval aviation and naval submarines at naval headquarters. He also served as the managing director of Bangladesh Shipping Corporation in 2022-2023, when Hoque cited plans to purchase an additional 18-21 ships for the corporation.

Hoque was promoted to rear admiral in January 2024 and was designated as the senior directing staff at the National Defence College. Hoque was appointed director general of the Bangladesh Coast Guard by the Yunus administration in October 2024.

== Parsonal life ==
The Rear Admiral is married to Mrs Farhana Begum and blessed with two sons and one daughter. He likes to pass his time reading, travelling and occasionally playing golf.
