= Mohammed Mahbub-ul-Islam =

Bangladeshi admiral

- Native name: মোহাম্মদ মাহাবুব উল ইসলাম
- Allegiance: Bangladesh
- Branch: Bangladesh Navy
- Service years: 1983 – 2022
- Rank: Rear Admiral
- Commands: Assistant Chief of Naval Staff (Logistics); Assistant Chief of Naval Staff (Personnel); Commander, Bangladesh Navy Fleet (COMBAN); Chairman of Bangladesh Inland Water Transport Authority; Commodore, BNS Sheikh Mujib
- Awards: Bisishtho Sheba Padak (BSP)
- Alma mater: Bangladesh Naval Academy; United States Naval War College; National Defence College

Mohammed Mahbub-ul-Islam, BSP, ndc, psc is a retired two star admiral of the Bangladesh Navy who served as assistant chief of naval staff (logistics). Prior to this appointment, he served as assistant chief of naval staff (personnel) .

== Career ==
He was promoted to rear admiral on 16 January 2020. Before that, M Mahbub Ul Islam was the chairman of Bangladesh Inland Water Transport Authority while he was commodore. He was promoted to commodore from captain on 24 November 2013. Mohammed Mahbub-ul Islam has served as the acting chairman of Bangladesh Institute of Maritime Research and Development (BIMRAD) until retirement.

== Family ==
Mahbub-ul-Islam is married to Kazi Rehana Sharmin Kanta and has two daughters.
