= Mohammad Musa =

Bangladeshi admiral

- মোহাম্মদ মুসা
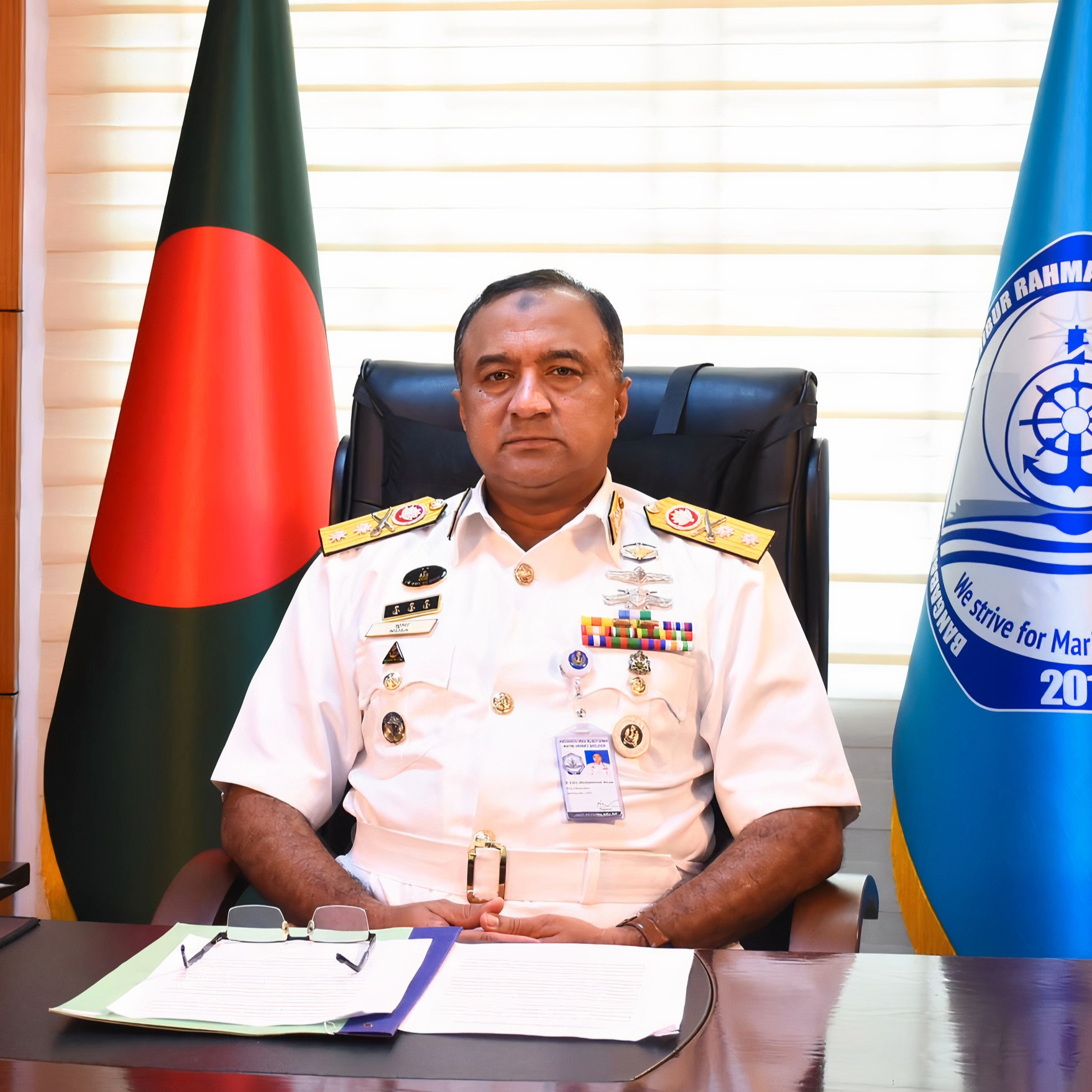
- Musa in June 2023.
- Born: 1 September 1967 (age 59); Narayanganj, East Pakistan, Pakistan
- Spouse: Nishat Rahman
- Children: 2
- Relatives: Muhammad Mafidur Rahman (brother)
- Military career
- Allegiance: Bangladesh
- Branch: Bangladesh Navy
- Service years: 1987 – 2026
- Rank: Rear Admiral
- Commands: Assistant Chief of Naval Staff (Operations); Assistant Chief of Naval Staff (Personnel); Vice Chancellor of Bangabandhu Sheikh Mujibur Rahman Maritime University; Chairman of Mongla Port Authority; Commander, Khulna Naval Area (COMKHUL); Commander, BNS Khalid Bin Walid; Director of Naval Aviation
- Awards: Oshamanno Sheba Padak (OSP); Nou Parodorshita Padak (NPP); CNS Commendation (four times)

Mohammad Musa (Note: (G), OSP, NPP, rcds, afwc, psc, MPhill,PhD, BN) is a retired two star officer of Bangladesh Navy and the assistant chief of naval staff (operations). He is the former vice chancellor of Bangladesh Maritime University and also the chairman of Mongla Port Authority. He also served as commander of Khulna Naval Area. On 10 August 2025, the interim government, through the Ministry of Defence issued an order extending his service tenure by one year in accordance with the provisions of the Navy Ordinance, 1961 (Ordinance No. XXXV of 1961), with the new term ending on 31 August 2026.

== Early life and education ==
Musa was born in 1967 at Narayanganj of then East Pakistan, Pakistan (now Dhaka Division, Bangladesh). He completed his elementary school in IET Government High School, Narayanganj. Musa is an alumnus of Sylhet Cadet College and joined Bangladesh Naval Academy on 27 January 1985. Musa was commissioned in executive branch on 1 July 1987 with the batch aligned to 15th BMA Long Course. He is a Naval artillery officer and has undergone officer's basic training at Royal Malaysian Navy. He has graduated from the Royal College of Defence Studies, US Naval Postgraduate School, King's College London, National Defence College and Defence Services Command and Staff College.

He holds four masters degrees and has also obtained his M Phil from Bangladesh University of Professionals in 2015 and PhD in Maritime Awareness: Bangladesh Perspective from Jahangirnagar University. Musa was also designated as Bangladesh representative in the State Party meeting in the United Nations in 2013.

== Military career ==
Musa served as chief instructor at Bangladesh Naval Academy and also commandant of Naval Gunnery and Seamanship School. He has commanded three warships including flagship, BNS Khalid Bin Walid. He also led a patrol boat, two offshore vessel and one naval base. He also served as naval secretary, commanded Naval Administrative Authority Dhaka and Khulna Naval Area. His staff roles include Director Naval Plans, Director Signals, Director of Submarines and Director Naval Aviation. Musa is notable for having rendered humanitarian assistance and support to local administration during COVID-19 outbreak as part of Bangladesh Navy's campaign of COVID-19 pandemic. Musa also served in Blue Economy Cell of Energy and Mineral Resources Division as director. He was sent to Royal College of Defence Studies (RCDS) after his assignment at Blue Economy Cell. Musa was then tenured as chairman of Mongla Port Authority from January 26, 2021. Musa implemented medical facilities for port employees and actively collaborated with local governments and civil administration in Mongla Port. He distributed goods to port laborers and engaged in talks with worker unions and trade associations. Under his leadership, the Mongla Port remained operational without interruption throughout his two-year tenure, demonstrating his commitment to seamless port activities and trade operations.

Musa's leadership and management has ameliorated into a legacy. He is regard as one of the notable chairpersons of the Mongla Port Authority and gained national attention for his efforts in revitalizing a port that was previously considered inactive. Under his guidance, the port experienced a remarkable transformation, breaking records even during the challenging period of the COVID-19 pandemic in 2021. He was then appointed as vice chancellor of Bangladesh Maritime University in January 2023. Musa returned to naval headquarters in August 2024 and designated as assistant chief of naval staff for personnel. He was re-appointed as assistant chief of staff for operations in January 2025. He is the incumbent chairman of North Indian Ocean Hydrographic Commission (NIOHC) and National Hydrographic Committee of Bangladesh.

== Personal life ==
Musa is married to Nishat Rahman and is father of two sons. he was featured as the cover focus of the magazine ICE Business Times on 15 February 2022. he was also featured in The Prestige Magazine on 3 June 2023. Musa's elder brother Muhammad Mafidur Rahman is a retired two star air officer of Bangladesh Air Force and former chairman of Civil Aviation Authority of Bangladesh.
