= M. Ashraful Haq =

Bangladeshi naval officer

Mohammad Ashraful Haque NBP, NUP, BCGM

15th Director General of Bangladesh Coast Guard
- In office 10 February 2019 – 24 August 2021
- President: Abdul Hamid
- Prime Minister: Sheikh Hasina
- Preceded by: Aurangzeb Chowdhury
- Succeeded by: Ashraful Hoq Chowdhury

Personal details
- Born: March 1, 1965 (age 61)
- Awards: Noubahini Padak (NBP); Nou Utkorso Padak (NUP)

Military service
- Allegiance: Bangladesh
- Branch/service: Bangladesh Navy; Bangladesh Coast Guard
- Years of service: 1985 – 2023
- Rank: Rear Admiral
- Commands: Assistant Chief of Naval Staff (Operations); Director General of Bangladesh Coast Guard; Commander, Khulna Naval Area (COMKHUL); Commander, BN Fleet (COMBAN); Managing Director of Dockyard and Engineering Works; Commodore, BNS Isa Khan

Mohammad Ashraful Haque NBP, NUP, BCGM, ndc, afwc, psc is a retired admiral of the Bangladesh Navy. He served as the assistant chief of naval staff (operations). Prior to that, he served as director general of the Bangladesh Coast Guard. Before that, he was the commander of the Khulna Naval Area.

== Early life and education ==
Haq was born on 1 March 1965. After successfully completing SSC and HSC, he joined Bangladesh Naval Academy on 15 October 1982 and got commissioned in the Executive Branch on 15 April 1985. He is a graduate of Mirpur Staff College & National Defence College. He completed his post graduate from National Defense College, Delhi, India.

== Career ==
Haq served as the serjeant-at-arms of the Bangladesh Parliament while he was commodore. He was managing director of Dockyard and Engineering Works Ltd and also served as commander of the Bangladesh Navy Fleet. He retired on 28 February 2023.

== Personal life ==
Haq is married to Farzana Kabir, and they have a daughter.
