= Md Moinul Hassan =

Bangladeshi admiral

19th Director General of Bangladesh Coast Guard
- Incumbent
- Assumed office 10 September 2026
- President: Mirza Fakhrul Islam Alamgir
- Prime Minister: Tarique Rahman
- Preceded by: Muhammad Ziaul Hoque

Military service
- Allegiance: Bangladesh
- Branch/service: Bangladesh Navy; Bangladesh Coast Guard
- Years of service: January 1, 1992 - present
- Rank: Rear Admiral
- Commands: Commander, Bangladesh Navy Fleet; Commander, Chittagong Naval Area; Commandant, Navy Training and Doctrine Command (NATDOC) of the Bangladesh Navy; Additional Director General, Bangladesh Coast Guard; Commodore, Naval Aviation (COMNAV) Bangladesh Navy

Md Moinul Hassan NBP, BSP, BCGM, ndc, ncc, psc is the 19th Director General of the Bangladesh Coast Guard. Prior to his appointment, he was the commander of the Chattogram Naval Area, based at BNS Issa Khan. He also served as commander of the Bangladesh Navy Fleet. Hassan was the inaugural Commandant of the Navy Training and Doctrine Command (NATDOC), an organization within the Bangladesh Navy.

== Education ==
Rear Admiral Moinul has pursued extensive training and education both in Bangladesh and abroad. He is a graduate of the Defence Services Command and Staff College (DSCSC), Mirpur, Dhaka, and the National Defence College (NDC), Mirpur, Dhaka. He also graduated from the Defence Services Staff College from Wellington, India, and is an alumnus of the Naval War College, Rhode Island, USA, where he completed the Naval Command College Course (NCC 2017). His academic qualifications include an MSc in Defence Studies (MDC) from the National University, Bangladesh, and an MSc in Strategic Studies from Tamilnadu University, India. He also attended the Senior Staff Course from Bangladesh Public Administration Training Centre in Savar, Dhaka. The Rear Admiral is pursuing PhD from Bangladesh University of Professionals (BUP).

== Military career ==
Rear Admiral Moinul joined the Bangladesh Navy on July 1, 1989, and was commissioned into the Executive Branch on January 1, 1992. His distinguished career is marked by a blend of key command, staff, and instructional roles. As a skilled navigator, he has dedicated a significant portion of his career to sea duty and navigational responsibilities. He also made notable contributions to the development of the Naval Aviation Wing while serving as both Commodore Naval Aviation (COMNAV) and Commanding Officer, Flying Wing. The Rear Admiral has commanded a diverse range of vessels, including one corvette, two offshore patrol vessels (OPV), three medium and small fast attack craft (FAC), and one missile boat. He has also proven his expertise as Commanding Officer, Flying Wing. His instructional experience includes serving as an instructor at the Navigation School and as Directing Staff (Naval Wing) at the Defence Services Command and Staff College (DSCSC). His staff appointments at Naval Headquarters include Director of Naval Plans, Director of Naval Aviation, and Naval Secretary. Additionally, he served as Deputy Director General of the Bangladesh Coast Guard under the Ministry of Home Affairs.In 2007-2008, the Rear Admiral served as a military observer for the United Nations Mission in Ivory Coast (UNOCI). He has represented the Bangladesh Navy in various international exercises and seminars, such as AMAN, IMDEX, WPNS, Aero India, IONS, EFES Turkey, EURONAVAL France etc.

== Service medal ==
In recognition of his distinguished service, the Rear Admiral was awarded the Nou Bahini Padak (NBP), the Bishista Sheba Padak (BSP) for his operational contributions to the Navy, and the Bangladesh Coast Guard Medal (BCGM) from the Coast Guard.

== Parsonal life ==
Rear Admiral Moinul is happily married to Sharmin Sultana and blessed with two daughters.
