= Sadikur Rahman Chowdhury =

Chairman of the Civil Aviation Authority of Bangladesh
- In office 27 June 2024 – 26 July 2024
- Preceded by: Muhammad Mafidur Rahman
- Succeeded by: Monjur Kabir Bhuiyan

Military service
- Rank: Air Commodore

Sadikur Rahman Chowdhury is an air commodore of the Bangladeshi Air Force, and the former Chairman of the Civil Aviation Authority of Bangladesh.

== Career ==
Chowdhury was a member of the Civil Aviation Authority of Bangladesh in charge of operations.

Chowdhury was appointed Chairman of the Civil Aviation Authority of Bangladesh by the Ministry of Public Administration on 27 June 2024. He succeeded Air Vice Marshal M Mafidur Rahman, who retired. He was removed on 26 July and replaced by Marshal Monjur Kabir Bhuiyan after the fall of the Sheikh Hasina led Awami League government.

Chowdhury was then appointed the Director of the Directorate of Flight Safety of the Bangladesh Air Force. He is a member of the trustee board of the Bangladesh Air Force Welfare Trust.
