= A. S. M. A. Baten =

Bangladeshi Admiral

A. S. M. A. Baten is a retired rear admiral of the Bangladesh Navy and former vice-chancellor of Bangladesh Maritime University. He is the secretary general of the Bangladesh Ocean Going Ship Owners Association.

== Early life ==
Baten graduated from Bangladesh University of Engineering and Technology.

== Career ==
In 2010, Baten was the Admin Authority of Dhaka Area Naval Command. He taught at the National Defence College. He was the president of the Disaster Management seminar organising committee, a joint seminar between the Bangladesh Navy and the Indian Ocean Naval Symposium.

Baten was appointed the first vice-chancellor of the Bangabandhu Sheikh Mujibur Rahman Maritime University in January 2014. He was the chief guest at an event marking the 41st death anniversary of former President Sheikh Mujibur Rahman at the university in 2016. He led a delegation of the university to the University of Hawaiʻi at Hilo and signed a memorandum between the two universities. Rear Admiral M Khaled Iqbal replaced him as the vice-chancellor of the Bangabandhu Sheikh Mujibur Rahman Maritime University in February 2018.

Baten is the secretary general of the Bangladesh Ocean Going Ship Owners Association. He is a member of the Association of Naval Architects and Marine Engineers, Bangladesh, and the Federation of Bangladesh Chambers of Commerce & Industries.
