= BNS Pekua =

Bangladeshi Navy base

- Pekua, Cox's Bazar, Bangladesh

Site information
- Type: Submarine base
- Controlled by: Bangladesh Navy

Location
- Coordinates: 21.799°N 91.905°E

Site history
- Built: 20 March, 2023

Garrison information
- Current commander: Commodore Syed Shaif-Ul Islam

BNS Pekua is a naval base of Bangladesh Navy located in Pekua, Cox's Bazar. This is the first full-fledged submarine base of Bangladesh Navy. Built at a cost of $1.21 billion, the base can simultaneously accommodate six submarines and eight warships. It will allow for safe and swift movement of the submarines in case of emergency, as the base is located at the Bay of Bengal.

== History ==
On 3 March 2017 the then Prime Minister of Bangladesh, Sheikh Hasina laid the foundation stone of a submarine base in Pekua in the coastal city of Cox's Bazar. Construction started in 2019 and the base was completed in 2023. On 20th March of the same year, the Prime Minister of Bangladesh commissioned the submarine base.

== Facilities ==
BNS Pekua is the largest submarine base in South Asia.

== See also ==
- List of ships of the Bangladesh Navy
- Bangladesh Navy Hydrographic & Oceanographic Center
