= Khandakar Akhter Hossain =

Two star officer of the Bangladesh Navy

Khandakar Akhter Hossain NBP, NUP, ndc, psc, PhD

Vice-Chancellor Bangladesh Maritime University
- In office 10 May 2025 – 10 September 2026
- Chancellor: Mohammed Shahabuddin
- Preceded by: Ashraful Hoq Chowdhury

Personal details
- Awards: Nou Utkorsho Padak (NUP); Noubahini Padak (NBP)

Military service
- Allegiance: Bangladesh
- Branch/service: Bangladesh Navy
- Years of service: 1991–present
- Rank: Rear Admiral
- Commands: Vice-Chancellor of Maritime University Bangladesh; Assistant Chief of Naval Staff (M) Bangladesh Navy; Managing Director, Khulna Shipyard

Khandakar Akhter Hossain is a rear admiral of the Bangladesh Navy and former vice-chancellor of Bangladesh Maritime University. Prior to joining BMU, he served as the assistant chief of naval staff (materiel).

== Early life and education ==
Hossain has completed his BSc. and MSc. Engineering in naval architecture and marine engineering with a distinct result from Bangladesh University of Engineering and Technology (BUET). He also holds a PhD from the same institution.

== Military career ==
Akhter Hossain was commissioned into the Engineering Branch of the Bangladesh Navy on 1 January 1991. He served as managing director of Chittagong Dry Dock Limited (CDDL), Dockyard and Engineering Works (DEW), and Khulna Shipyard (KSY). He was head of the Department of Naval Architecture and Marine Engineering at MIST while he was a commodore.

== Personal life ==
Hossain is married to Sharmin Hasan. He has four children: twin daughters and two sons.
