= Moazzem Hossain =

- Born: 18 September 1933; Pirojpur, Bengal, British India
- Died: 26 March 1971 (aged 37); Dhaka, Bangladesh
- Spouse: Kohinoor Hossain
- Military career
- Allegiance: Bangladesh; Pakistan (before 1969)
- Branch: Bangladesh Navy; Pakistan Navy
- Service years: 1950 - 1971
- Rank: Lieutenant Commander
- Awards: Independence Day Award

Moazzem Hossain was a Pakistan Navy lieutenant commander and an accused in the Agartala Conspiracy Case. He was killed by the Pakistan Army during the Bangladesh Liberation War.

== Early life ==
He was born on 17 September 1932 in Dumuritala, Pirojpur, East Bengal. His father was Mofazzel Ali, and his mother was Latifunnesa Begum. He graduated from Kachua High School. He later joined Bagerhat College and Brajamohan College.

== Career ==
In 1950, he joined the Pakistan Navy and received his commission. He completed his mechanical engineering and marine engineering degrees from the British Institute of Mechanical Engineering and the British Institute of Marine Engineering in 1958–1960. In 1966, he was made chief engineer of Chittagong Naval Base. He was promoted to the rank of lieutenant commander one year later. He was deputed to the East Pakistan Inland Water Transport Authority in Barisal. On 9 December 1967, he was arrested by the Military Intelligence Branch. He was charged under the Agartala Conspiracy Case. He was accused of supporting separatism in East Pakistan. The Agartala Conspiracy Case was withdrawn on 22 February 1969. He returned to service upon release and retired on 18 March 1970.

He joined politics after retirement. He declared his intention on 24 March 1970 to establish an independent country based on the Lahore Resolution. To that end, on 28 March 1970, he established the Lahore Prostab Bastabayan Committee. He tried to convince Sheikh Mujibur Rahman to start an armed rebellion. He asked those in his party to take military training. He traveled to different parts of East Pakistan to mobilize public opinion.

== Death and legacy ==
He was killed in his home in Dhaka on 26 March 1971 by the Pakistani army. Bangladesh Navy base BNS Shaheed Moazzem in Rangamati was named after him on 16 January 1976. On 14 December 1993, a commemorative postal stamp was issued in his name. Shaheed Lieutenant Commander Moazzem Hossain Sarak, a road in Dhaka, was named after him by the Dhaka City Corporation. In 2012, he was given the Independence Award posthumously by the government of Bangladesh.
