= Bangladesh Meteorological Department =

Department of Bangladesh Government

- বাংলাদেশ আবহাওয়া অধিদপ্তর

Agency overview
- Type: Ministry
- Jurisdiction: Government
- Headquarters: Dhaka, Bangladesh
- Agency executives: Director; Dr. Md Shadekul Alam
- Parent department: Ministry of Defense
- Website: www.bmd.gov.bd

The Bangladesh Meteorological Department (BMD) (Bengali: বাংলাদেশ আবহাওয়া অধিদপ্তর) also known as Abhawa Office (Weather Office), is the national meteorological organization of Bangladesh, working under Ministry of Defense of the Government of Bangladesh. It is responsible for maintaining the network of surface and upper air observatories, radar and satellite stations, agrometeorological observatories, geomagnetic and seismological observatories and meteorological telecommunication system of Bangladesh.

== See also ==
- Bangladesh Navy Hydrographic & Oceanographic Center (BNHOC)
