= Bangladesh Maritime University =

Public maritime university in Bangladesh

Coordinates: 23.8272°N 90.3638°E

- Bengali: বাংলাদেশ মেরিটাইম বিশ্ববিদ্যালয়
- Logo of Bangladesh Maritime University
- Other name: BMU
- Former name: Bangabandhu Sheikh Mujibur Rahman Maritime University (2013-2025)
- Motto in English: We strive for maritime excellence.
- Type: Public Research University
- Established: 2013; 13 years ago
- Accreditation: University Grants Commission of Bangladesh and Bangladesh Navy
- Chancellor: President Mirza Fakhrul Islam Alamgir
- Vice-Chancellor: Rear Admiral Md. Niyamat Elahee
- Administrative staff: 150+
- Students: 1050+
- Undergraduates: 850+
- Postgraduates: 200+
- Location: Temporary Campus: Plot# 14/06-14/23, Pallabi Mirpur-12, Dhaka-1216. Permanent Campus: Hamidchar, Chittagong, Dhaka, Bangladesh
- Campus: 106.6 acres; Urban
- Colours: Blue
- Website: bmu.edu.bd

Bangladesh Maritime University (Bengali: বাংলাদেশ মেরিটাইম বিশ্ববিদ্যালয়) is a public university in Dhaka, Bangladesh, specializing in maritime studies. It was established in 2013. It is the first maritime university in Bangladesh, the 3rd maritime university in South Asia, and the 12th maritime university in the world. Alongside this, Marine Officer Cadets are awarded an internationally recognized Bachelor of Maritime Science degree from here.

It issued its first calls for admission in December 2016. The BSc in oceanography program was started on 3 January 2017 at the university's temporary campus in Mirpur, as part of the first-ever launch of the bachelor class in the university. Then in 2018, the first batch of BSc in Naval Architecture and Offshore Engineering classes started. Two more program classes started in 2019: LLB in maritime law and BBA in port management and logistics. In January 2020, the program for a BSc in Fisheries was initialized.

== History and overview ==
Bangladesh Maritime University (BMU) came out as the first-ever maritime university of Bangladesh by an Act of the Parliament on 26 October 2013.

After the fall of the Sheikh Hasina-led Awami League government, Bangabandhu Sheikh Mujibur Rahman Maritime University was renamed Bangladesh Maritime University.

== List of vice-chancellors ==
1. Rear Admiral A. S. M. A. Baten (Retd)(2013–2018)
2. Rear Admiral M Khaled Iqbal (Retd) (2018–2023)
3. Rear Admiral Mohammad Musa (2023–2024)
4. Rear Admiral Ashraful Hoq Chowdhury (2024-2025)
5. Rear Admiral Khandakar Akhter Hossain (2025-2026)
6. Rear Admiral Md. Niyamat Elahee (2026-Present)

== Faculties ==
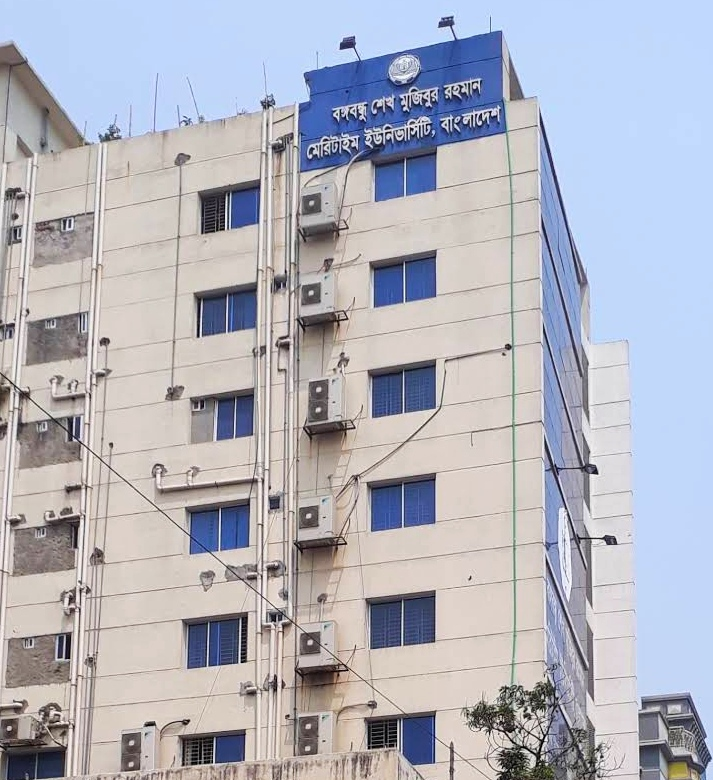
Building-1 (Dhaka Campus)

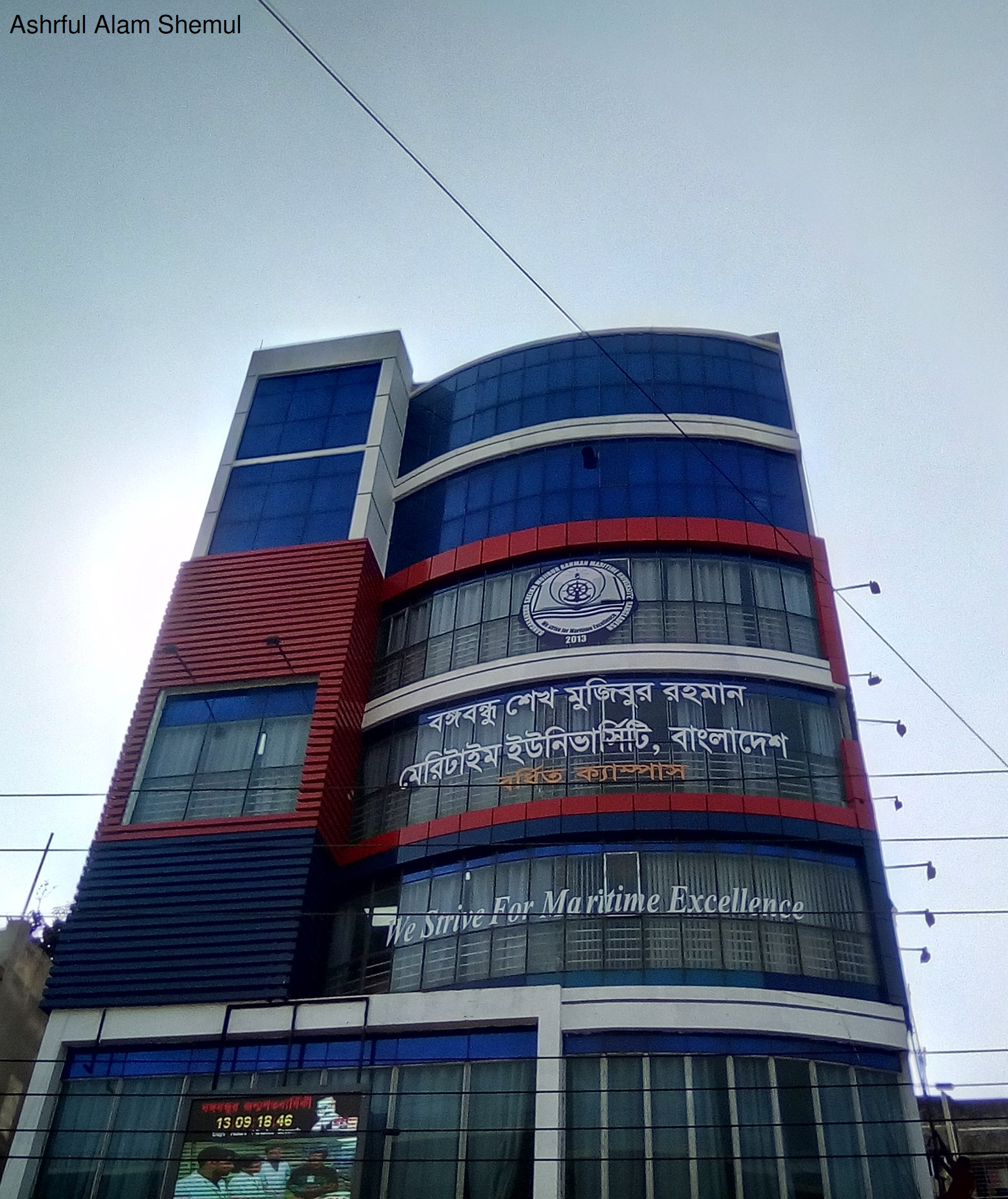
Bhaban-2 (Dhaka Campus)

The university has 36 departments under a total of 8 faculties for teaching and research at the undergraduate and postgraduate levels in marine fisheries, safe shipping management and administration, naval engineering and technology, oceanography, international maritime law, etc. However, only 5 departments are open for undergraduate level. There is also a Bachelor of Marine Science for Marine Cadets. Apart from this, post-graduate degrees are also being given in some additional subjects. In the future, bachelor's degrees will also be given from these faculties. Faculties are as follows:

- Faculty of Maritime Governance and Policy (FMGP)
- Faculty of Shipping Administration (FSA)
- Faculty of Earth and Ocean Science (FEOS)
- Faculty of Engineering and Technology (FET)
- Faculty of Computer Science and Informatics (FCSI)
- Faculty of Maritime Business Studies (FMBS)
- Faculty of General Studies (FGS)

== Affiliated institutes ==
List of Maritime Institutes in Bangladesh

Institutes details

- Bangladesh Marine Academy, Chattogram
- Bangladesh Marine Fisheries Academy, Chattogram
- Bangladesh Marine Academy, Sylhet
- Bangladesh Marine Academy, Pabna
- Bangladesh Marine Academy, Barishal
- Bangladesh Marine Academy, Rangpur
- International Maritime Academy

== Facilities ==
=== Campus ===
The university has its temporary campus at Pallabi, Mirpur-12 in Dhaka. But a permanent campus will be established on 106.6 acres at Hamidchar, Bakolia, in Chittagong.

=== Computer labs ===
Computer Lab facility is available for the students of BMU. The Computer Lab is situated on the 1st floor of the campus. The lab computers are connected by both WIFI and broadband internet networks.

=== Conference Centre ===
Maritime University Bangladesh has a large auditorium on the 5th floor in its temporary campus. The seating capacity of the auditorium is 90.

=== Industrial/study tours and visits ===
To keep pace with the practical world and to orient the students with the maritime domain, BMU organizes the industrial tour, field trip, visit, etc., to different domestic and international maritime industries and organizations. The curriculum of the master's program of the university has also been designed with mandatory study tour/ field trip to keep the visit effective. In the national boundary, the students used to visit Chittagong Port Authority, Mongla Port Authority, Bangladesh Shipping Corporation, Bangladesh Navy ships, freight forwarding companies/ agencies, Pangaon Inland Container Terminal, Inland Container Depot- Kamalapur, private inland container depots, Department of Shipping, BIWTA, BIWTC, private shipping companies, private stevedoring companies, private and govt. owned shipyard and dockyard, ship breaking yard, sea beach, oceanographic research vessel etc. On the overseas tour, the students used to visit different maritime institutes, organizations, industries, etc. in South Asian and Southeast Asian countries.

== Collaboration ==
- List of collaborated Universities/Organizations (Overseas)
  - World Maritime University
  - Shanghai Maritime University
  - Dalian Maritime University
  - Myanmar Maritime University
  - Indian Maritime University
  - Western Sydney University
  - University of Hawaii at Hilo
  - Vietnam Maritime University
  - University of Strathclyde
  - Dockyard and Engineering Works Limited
  - Institute of Water Modelling

== Academics ==
=== Undergraduate programs ===
- Faculty of Earth & Oceans Science
  - B.Sc. (Hons) in Oceanography
  - B.Sc. (Hons) in Fisheries
- Faculty of Engineering & Technology
  - B.Sc. in Naval Architecture and Offshore Engineering
- Faculty of Shipping Administration
  - BBA in Port Management and Logistics
- Faculty of Maritime Governance & Policy
  - LLB in Maritime Law

=== Postgraduate programs ===
- MBA in Tourism and Hospitality Management
- MBA in Maritime Business
- Master in Oceanography
- MSc in Naval Architecture and Offshore Engineering
- MSc in Coastal and River Engineering
- Master in Marine Biotechnology
- Master in Maritime Science
- Master in Port and Shipping Management
- Master in Maritime Development and Strategic Studies
- LLM in Maritime Law

=== Short (Certificate) Courses ===
- Ship Design Software
- Supply Chain Management
- Freight Forwarding
- Marine Insurance and Claim
- Dangerous Goods Handling and Transportation
- Maritime English
- Project Management

== Halls of residence ==
There are three residential halls on the Dhaka campus of the university to facilitate students to stay. These halls are located in Mirpur DOHS. All sorts of residential facilities are available in these halls.

- Hall-1 (Male Wing-1)
- Hall-2 (Male Wing-2)
- Hall-3 (Female Wing)
