= BNS Ulka =

- বানৌজা উলকা
- Patenga, Chittagong, Bangladesh

Site information
- Type: Naval base
- Controlled by: Bangladesh Navy

Location
- Coordinates: 22.2662°N 91.7798°E

Garrison information
- Current commander: Rear Admiral Mir Ershad Ali

BNS Ulka is an establishment of the Bangladeshi Navy.

== Career ==
The Ulka is currently serving under the Commander Chittagong Naval Area(COMCHIT). About 200 personnel serve at Ulka, which is one of the smaller bases in the Bangladesh Navy. Ulka was established as a Naval Base to assist with missile operations. It is administered by the larger BNS Isa Khan base.

== See also ==
- List of active ships of the Bangladesh Navy
