= Mir Ershad Ali =

Bangladeshi admiral

Mir Ershad Ali OSP, NPP

17th Director General of Bangladesh Coast Guard
- In office 30 January 2024 – 29 September 2024
- President: Mohammed Shahabuddin
- Prime Minister: Sheikh Hasina; Muhammad Yunus (acting)
- Preceded by: Ashraful Hoq Chowdhury
- Succeeded by: Ziaul Hoque

Personal details
- Awards: Oshamanno Sheba Padak (OSP); Nou Parodorshita Padak (NPP); Commendation Padak

Military service
- Allegiance: Bangladesh
- Branch/service: Bangladesh Navy; Bangladesh Coast Guard
- Years of service: 1989–2026
- Rank: Rear Admiral
- Commands: Assistant Chief of Naval Staff (Personnel); Commander, Chittagong Naval Area (COMCHIT); Director General of Bangladesh Coast Guard; Commander, BN Fleet (COMBAN); Chairman of Mongla Port Authority; Commander, Flotilla West (COMFLOT-W)
- Battles/wars: MONUSCO

Mir Ershad Ali is a retired two-star rear admiral of the Bangladesh Navy who served as senior directing staff at the National Defense College. Before that, he was assistant chief of naval staff (personnel) at Naval Headquarters. Prior to that, he was the commander of the Chittagong Naval Area (BNS Issa Khan) and the director general of the Bangladesh Coast Guard. He also served as chairman of Mongla Port Authority and commander of the Bangladesh Navy Fleet.

== Military career ==
Ali was enlisted into the Bangladesh Naval Academy in 1987 and was commissioned in the executive branch as a gunnery officer in 1989. Ali commanded one warship, two patrol crafts, the Bangladesh naval fleet, and the Chittagong naval area. At naval headquarters he was the director of naval intelligence, naval training and operations, and, furthermore, director of multinational operations. Ali also served as naval secretary at the Indian Ocean Naval Symposium. As commodore, he commanded the western flotilla of the Bangladesh Navy as the commander flotilla west (COMFLOT West). On 25 January 2022, Ali was promoted to rear admiral and appointed the chairman of the Mongla Port Authority. He was designated as the director general of the Bangladesh Coast Guard on 30 January 2024. Ali returned to naval headquarters in August 2025 as assistant chief of naval staff for personnel.

== Personal life ==
Ali is married to Sharmin Jahan and has 2 sons.
