= Aeronautical Institute of Bangladesh =

Aviation school

- এ্যারোনটিকাল ইন্সটিটিউট অব বাংলাদেশ
- Motto: A Landmark in Aviation Engineering and Technology.
- Type: Private
- Established: 1999; 27 years ago
- Academic affiliations: Bangladesh Technical Education Board; Civil Aviation Authority of Bangladesh; Ministry of Education
- Chairman: Air Commodore (Rtd.) Khandkar Iftekhar Ahmad, PSC
- Principal: Engr. Khandkar Farhan Atif
- Students: 300
- Location: Dhaka, Bangladesh
- Campus: House-21, Road-01, Sector-13, Uttara, Dhaka - 1230
- Website: aib.edu.bd

The Aeronautical Institute of Bangladesh (Bengali: এ্যারোনটিকাল ইন্সটিটিউট অব বাংলাদেশ, lit. 'Aeronautical Institute of Bangladesh') or AIB is an aviation school in Bangladesh. AIB is the first private aeronautical institute in Bangladesh. The institute is under the Civil Aviation Authority of Bangladesh and governed by the Bangladesh Technical Education Board and Civil Aviation Authority of Bangladesh.

== History ==
AIB was established in 1999. The institute started its program from Sector-4, Uttara Model Town, Dhaka. Now it is situated in Sector-13, Uttara Model Town, Dhaka-1230.

The institute received in 2004 approval from both Bangladesh Technical Education Board and Civil Aviation Authority of Bangladesh.

The AIB is run by the College Code – 50158 and is the only Civil Aviation Authority of Bangladesh-approved private aviation training institute in Bangladesh.

== Campus ==
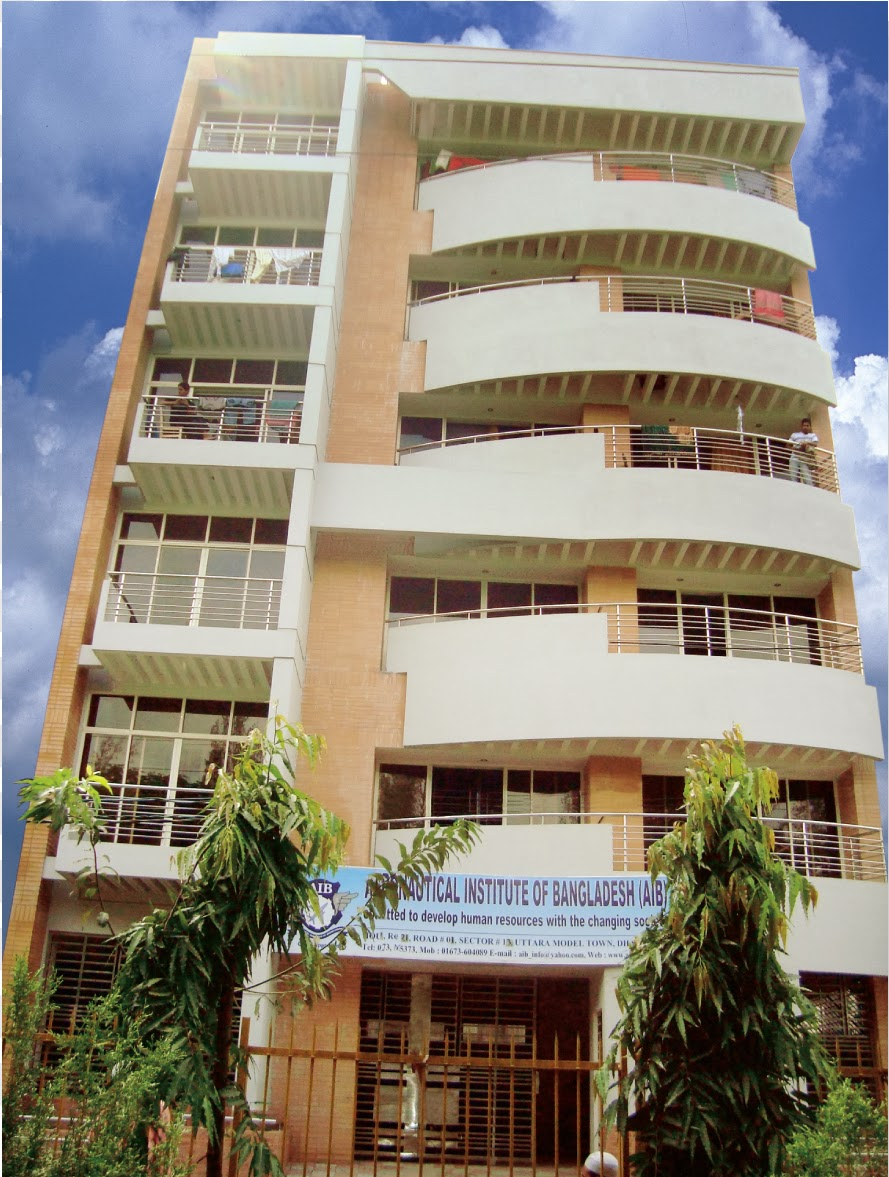
AIB campus

AIB is located at Uttara Model Town near to Hazrat Shajalal International Airport, in Sector-13, Road no. 01, in front of lake.

== Courses ==
The institute offers 4 year Diploma in Aircraft Maintenance Engineering with following specializations:

- Aerospace
- Avionics

It also offers the following basic and refresher courses:

- Airworthiness Legislation
- Human Performance and Limitations
- Rotorcraft Short Course
- Piston Engine Short Course
- AC Power Short Course
- DC Power Short Course
- Airworthiness Legislation Refresher
- Airframe Refresher
- Turbine Engine Refresher
- DC Power & AC Power Refresher
- General Aircraft Instrument & Integrated Flight Systems Refresher
- Human Performance and Limitations Refresher
- Basic Radio - Radar Refresher

♦ Special Course:

- Aviation Management
- Cabin Crew & Air Hostage
- Reservations & e-Ticketing
- Travel and Tourism

== Lab and workshop ==
The institute has a well-designed and -equipped electrical lab, high-speed WiFi computer lab, electronics and digital lab, instrumentation lab, power plant shop, general workshop, airframe workshop, component shop and tools store.

== Library and Cyber Center ==
AIB library has 2,000+ books and magazines and journals. This Institute has well designed a cyber center for Information Technology.

== Students organizations ==
- AIB Alumni Association - AAA
- AIB Aeromodeling Club

== See also ==
- List of aerospace engineering schools
- Dhaka Polytechnic Institute
