= Ashraful Hoq Chowdhury =

Retired two star officer of the Bangladesh Navy

16th Director General of Bangladesh Coast Guard
- In office 21 December 2021 – 14 January 2024
- President: Abdul Hamid; Mohammed Shahabuddin
- Prime Minister: Sheikh Hasina
- Preceded by: Ashraful Haq
- Succeeded by: Mir Ershad Ali

Personal details
- Spouse: Muslima Chowdhury
- Education: United States Pacific Fleet; National Defence College

Military service
- Allegiance: Bangladesh
- Branch/service: Bangladesh Navy; Bangladesh Coast Guard
- Years of service: 1988–2025
- Rank: Rear Admiral
- Commands: Vice-Chancellor of Maritime University Bangladesh; Commander, Khulna Naval Area (COMKHUL); Commodore, Superintendent Dockyard
- Battles/wars: MONUSCO

Ashraful Hoq Chowdhury (Note: (G), ndu, afwc, psc, BCGM, BN) is a retired two star officer of the Bangladesh Navy and former vice chancellor of Maritime University Bangladesh and director general of the Bangladesh Coast Guard. Before that, he was the commander of the Khulna Naval Area.

== Military career ==
Chowdhury joined the Bangladesh Navy in the executive branch on 1 January 1988. He completed the missile command and tactics course, a strategic studies course in China, a gunnery specialisation course in Pakistan, an armed forces war course at the National Defence College in Bangladesh and combined forces maritime component commander flag officer course in the United States Pacific Fleet headquarters.

He was a senate member of Bangabandhu Sheikh Mujibur Rahman Maritime University, Bangladesh. During his tenure in the Bangladesh Coast Guard, it received four 20-metre-long rescue boats with oil pollution control equipment supplied by the Japan International Cooperation Agency (JICA). He was appointed DG Coast Guard on 24 August 2021.

== Personal life ==
Ashraful Hoq Chowdhury is married to Muslima Chowdhury.
