= BNS Umar Farooq =

Two ships of Bangladesh Navy carried the name BNS Umar Farooq:

- BNS Umar Farooq (1976), a Salisbury-class frigate transferred from the Royal Navy.
- BNS Umar Farooq (2019), a Type 053H3 (Jiangwei II) frigate transferred from the People's Liberation Army Navy.
