= BNS Sher-e-Bangla =

Naval base of Bangladesh Navy

- Patuakhali, Barisal, Bangladesh
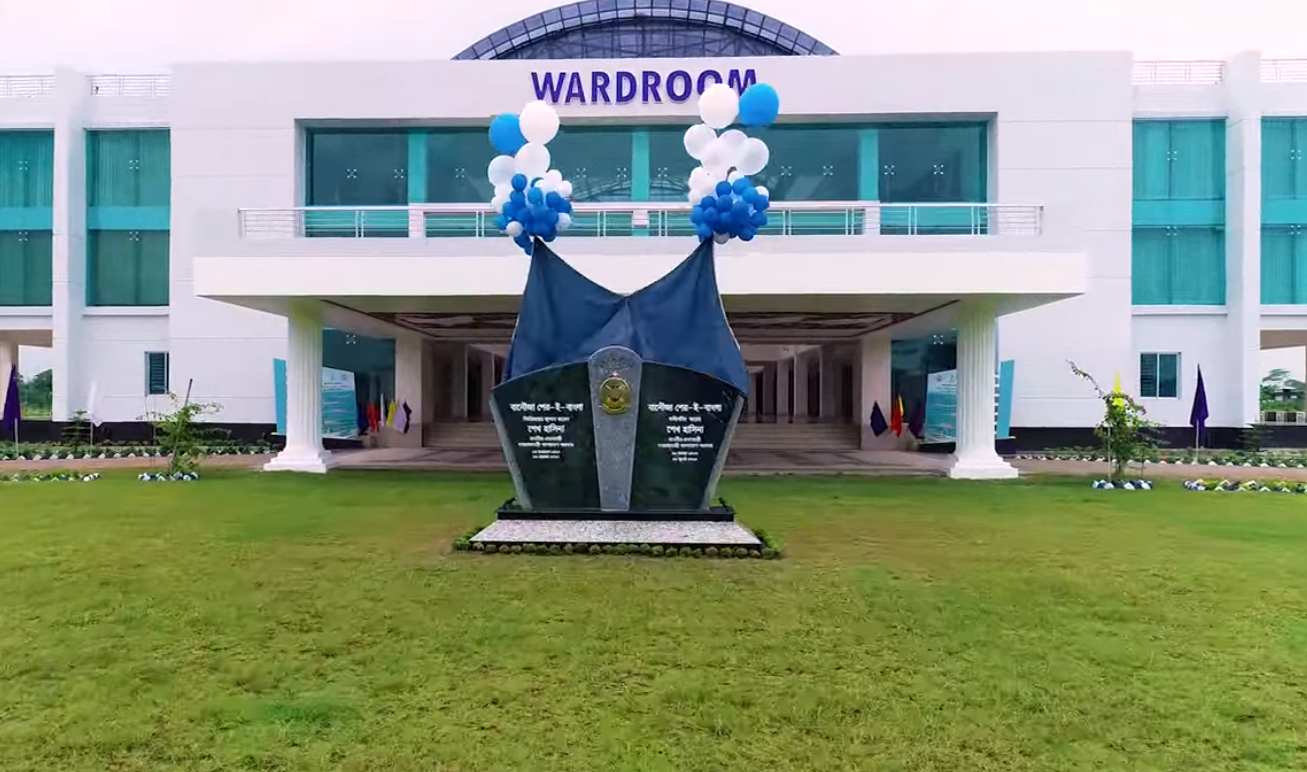

Site information
- Type: Naval base
- Controlled by: Bangladesh Navy

Location
- Coordinates: 21.9864°N 90.2960°E

Site history
- Built: 12 July 2023
- In use: 12 July 2023 - present

Garrison information
- Current commander: Rear Admiral Mohammad Maksud Alam

BNS Sher-e-Bangla is the first all service naval base being developed for the Bangladesh Navy at Rabnabad, Patuakhali. With an area of 700 acres. this is the largest naval base of the Bangladesh Navy. Of that area, 300 acres of land have been developed for naval base and 400 acres is devoted for naval aviation and submarine operations. It is named after the 1st Prime Minister of Bengal, A. K. Fazlul Huq, who was known as Sher-e-Bangla or the Tiger of Bengal.

== History ==
On 20 November 2013, Former Prime Minister Sheikh Hasina laid the foundation for BNS Sher-e-Bangla at Rabnabad, Patuakhali. On 2 January 2018, the executive committee of the National Economic Council (ECNEC) approved a project titled 'Establishment of BNS Sher-e-Bangla Patuakhali', worth Taka 1,081.50 crore. The project was overseen by The Ministry of Defence, Bangladesh Navy and the Engineer in Chief Section of Bangladesh Army. On 12 July 2023, The Prime Minister of Bangladesh commissioned BNS Sher-e-Bangla through online VTC from his office. Navy Chief Admiral M Shaheen Iqbal handed over the commissioning order to the base commander Commodore M Mohabbat Ali. After that, the name plaque was unveiled as per the custom of the Navy.

== Facilities ==
The naval base comprises training facilities of New Entry Trainee Sailors (NETS) besides aviation & submarine facilities at Kalapara, Patuakhali. The base also has a unit of diving salvage for special operations Apart from this, there are administrative buildings, aviation support and hangar facilities, multipurpose sheds, various repair and maintenance workshops to facilitate operational activities, a naval school & college and a 50-bed hospital.

== Functions ==
According to Bangladeshi officials, the main role and functions of this base will be to provide maritime and coastal protection, air support at the seaport and its adjacent areas, and resistance to attack from external enemies.
