= Muhammad Mafidur Rahman =

Bangladesh Air Force officer

Muhammad Mafidur Rahman BBP, BSP, BUP
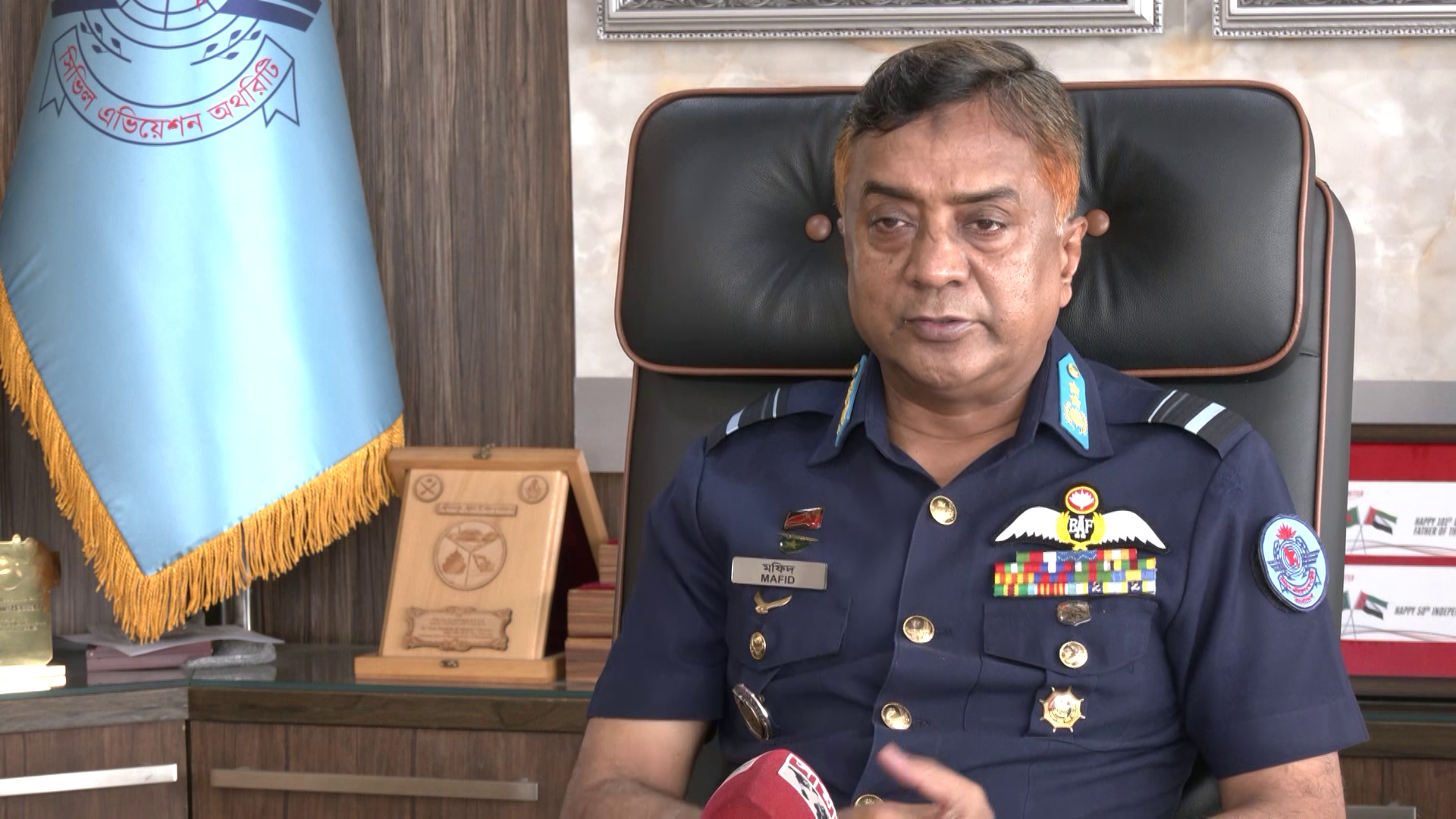

Chairman of Civil Aviation Authority of Bangladesh
- In office 28 June 2019 – 30 June 2024
- Prime Minister: Sheikh Hasina
- Preceded by: M. Naim Hassan
- Succeeded by: Sadikur Rahman Chowdhury

Personal details
- Born: 24 August 1964 (age 62) Narayanganj, East Pakistan, Pakistan
- Spouse: Sharmin Sultana
- Relations: Mohammad Musa (brother)
- Children: 2
- Education: Bangladesh Air Force Academy

Military service
- Allegiance: Bangladesh
- Branch/service: Bangladesh Air Force
- Years of service: 1985–2024
- Rank: Air Vice Marshal
- Unit: No. 21 Squadron
- Commands: AOC of BAF Base Zahurul Haque; AOC of BAF Base Bangabandhu; Chairman of Civil Aviation Authority of Bangladesh
- Battles/wars: UNPREDEP; MONUSCO

Muhammad Mafidur Rahman (Note: BBP, BSP, BUP, ndu, afwc, psc) is a retired two star air officer of the Bangladesh Air Force and former chairman of the Civil Aviation Authority, Bangladesh. Prior to that appointment, he was the air officer commanding at two important air bases, namely BAF Base Bangabandhu, Kurmitola, Dhaka, and BAF Base Zahurul Haque, Patenga, Chattogram.

== Career ==
Mafidur was enrolled at the Bangladesh Air Force Academy in 1983 and was commissioned in 1985 from the BAF Academy in the General Duties (Pilot) branch. On UN peacekeeping missions, he served as a military observer in Macedonia in 1998 and as contingent commander of aviation units in the DR Congo in 2005 and 2012. He is on the Board of Directors of Biman Bangladesh Airlines. He has been elected as vice-chairman of the 56th Conference of the Director General of Civil Aviation (DGCA) of the Asia Pacific (APAC) region. In December 2022, the defence ministry extended his service until December 2023 for the sake of public interest. For the 2nd time, Rahman's service was extended from 30 December 2023 to 30 June 2024 on the same ground.

After the fall of the Sheikh Hasina-led Awami League government, Rahman was charged in a corruption case.

== Personal life ==
He is married to Sharmin Sultana and father of twin daughters. His mother, Amena Begum, is a Ratnagarva Award winner. His younger brother, Rear Admiral Mohammad Musa, is a senior naval officer.
