= BNS Shaheed Moazzem =

Naval base of the Bangladesh Navy

- Rangamati, Chittagong, Bangladesh
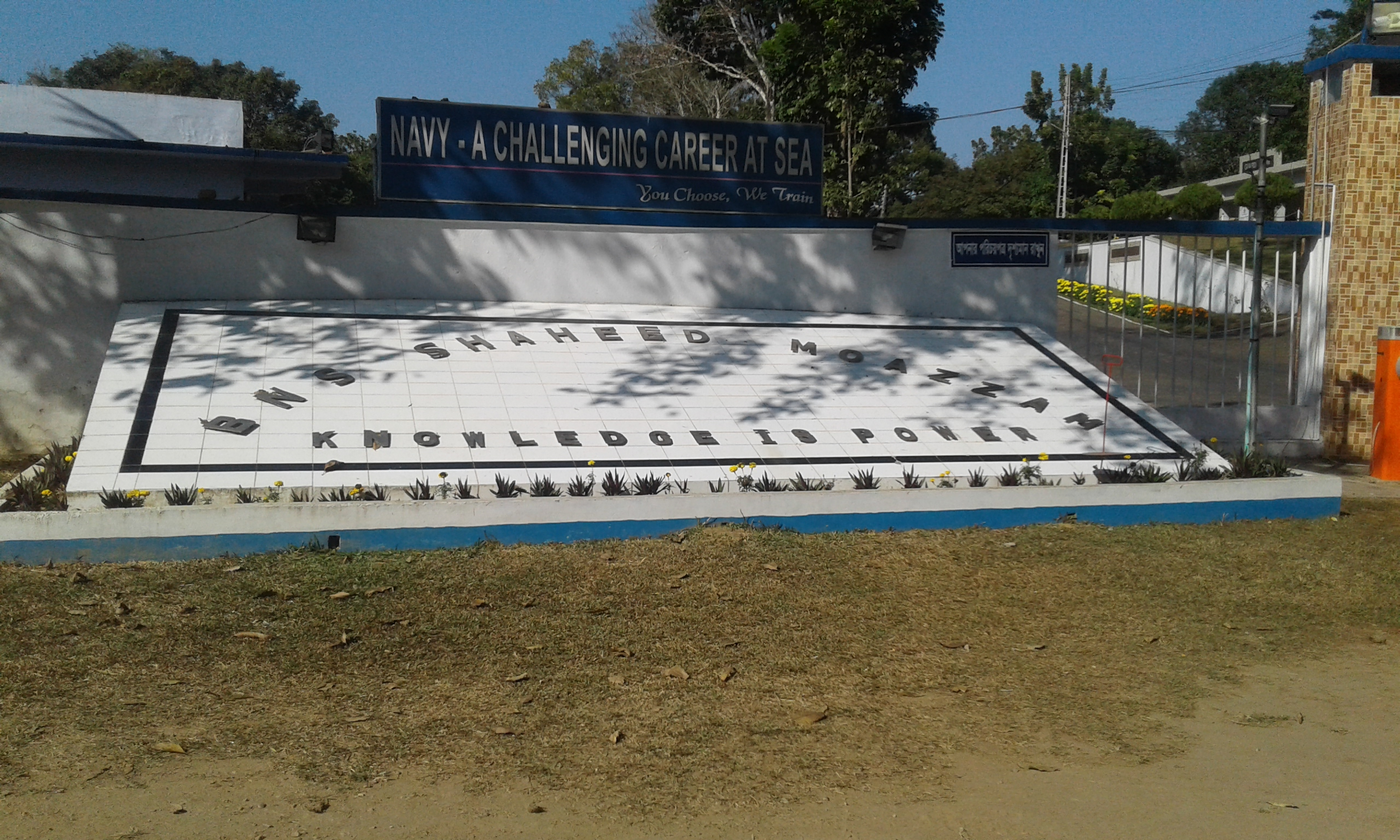
- Main Entrance to BNS Shaheed Moazzem

Site information
- Type: Naval base
- Controlled by: Bangladesh Navy

Site history
- Built: 1976
- In use: 1976 - Present

Garrison information
- Current commander: Captain Moinuddin Ahmed

BNS Shaheed Moazzem is a naval base of the Bangladesh Navy, established after the Bangladesh Liberation War of 1971, and named in honour of shaheed (Martyr) Lieutenant Commander Moazzem Hossain who had sacrificed his life for his motherland in the Bangladesh Liberation War.

== Functions ==
The Shaheed Moazzem is currently under the command of the Commander Chittagong Naval Area (COMCHIT). About 1500 personnel serve at BNS Shaheed Moazzem, which is one of the largest bases in the Bangladesh Navy. BNS Shaheed Moazzem was established to train officers and sailors. and consists of three training schools, working under the Bangladesh National University:

== Training Facilities ==
The premier technical training establishment of Bangladesh Navy, BNS SHAHEED MOAZZEM, has three Schools named Engineering School, Electrical School and Seamanship School to conduct training of the officers and sailors. The spectrum of officers training encompasses Long Electrical Course (LEC) conducted by Navy Electrical School, Marine Engineering Specialization Course (MESC) conducted by Navy Engineering School. The sailors professional training is also conducted at these schools.

- Electrical School: Providing Diplomas, Bachelors and Masters in electrical, electronics, radioing and electrical engineering.
- Engineering School (Mechanical School): Providing Diplomas, Bachelor and Masters in mechanical engineering.
- Seamanship School: Providing training in seamanship.

== Accommodation Facilities ==
BNS Shaheed Moazzem has well-furnished Wardroom/Gunroom for Officers and dormitory for sailors.

== Heritage of Rangamati ==
Rangamati is a hilly town, which is known for its panoramic view. With enchanting scenic beauty, Kaptai lake also provides sweet water fishes in abundance. Different types of fresh fruits also grow in the hilly terrain of the area. Largest Reserve Forest of the country is in this area. The town is lightly populated and most of the inhabitants are of tribal origin. The tribal cultures dominate the age old heritage of Rangamati.

== See also ==
- List of active ships of the Bangladesh Navy
