= BNS Dhaka =

Bangladeshi Navy naval base in Dhaka

- Khilkhet, Dhaka, Bangladesh

Site information
- Type: Naval base
- Controlled by: Bangladesh Navy

Site history
- Built: 2018
- In use: 2018 - Present

Garrison information
- Current commander: Rear Admiral Abdullah Al Maksus

BNS Dhaka is a full-fledged naval base of the Bangladesh Navy in Dhaka of Bangladesh. It is one of largest bases in Dhaka of Bangladesh Navy.

== History ==
With the aim of Forces Goal 2030, Bangladesh Navy is continuing to enhance its capabilities by establishing new bases to support the force in large extent especially logistics and information technological support in capital. To fulfill a goal, Prime Minister Sheikh Hasina commissioned this full-fledged naval base on November 5, 2018, to be called BNS Sheikh Mujib. Bangladesh Navy treats this installation as crucial to cater the operational needs of the force in the capital.

== Functions ==
The main objective of this naval base is to coordinate disaster response services alongside running their naval information technology programme and naval intelligence training and operating helicopters of the force. Navy helicopters are stationed and maintained as well in this floated base.

== See also ==
- List of ships of the Bangladesh Navy
