= Civil Aviation Authority of Bangladesh =

Bangladesh aviation organization

- বেসামরিক বিমান চলাচল কর্তৃপক্ষ বাংলাদেশ; Besamôrik Biman Côlacôl Kôrtṛpôkṣô Baṅladeś

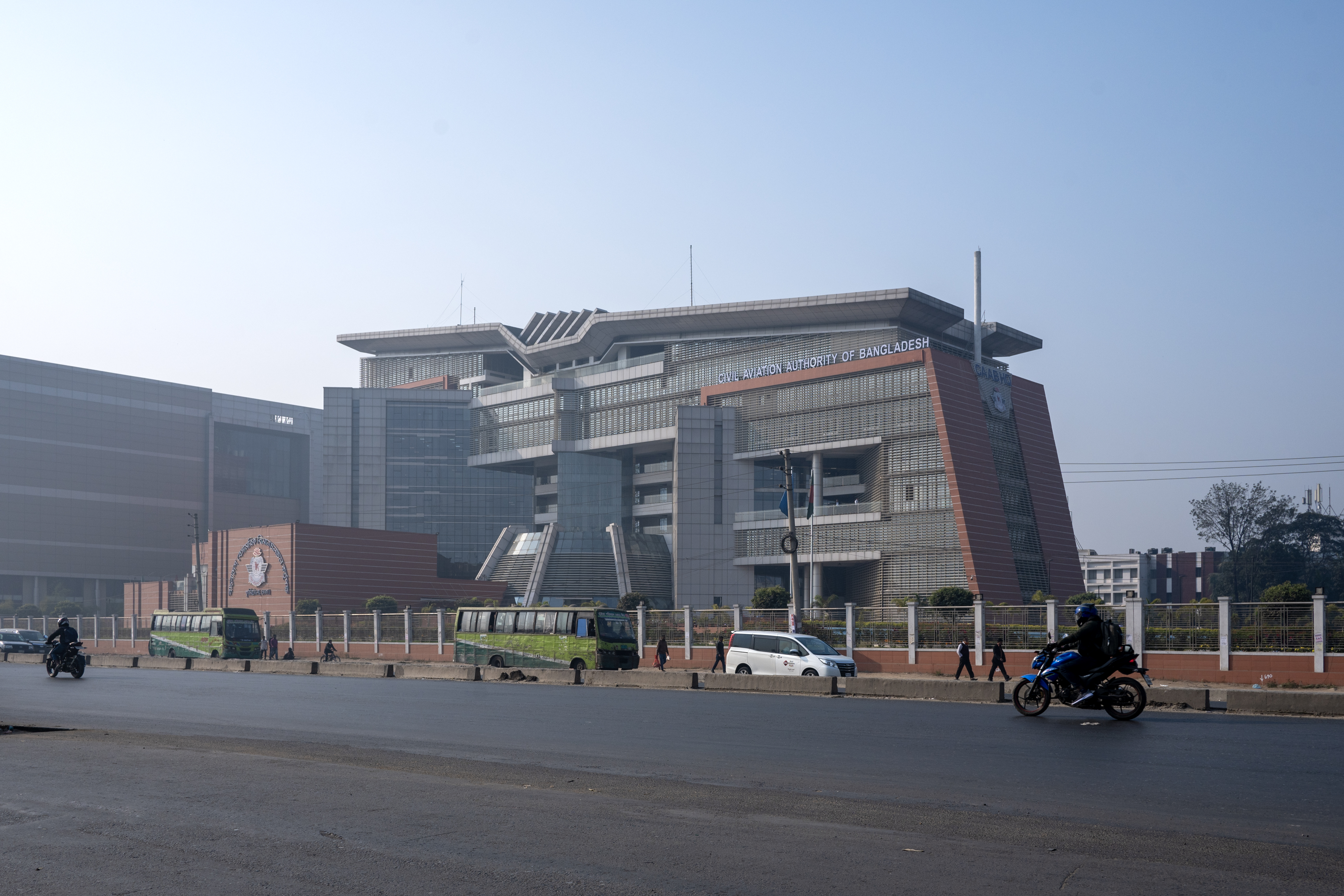

Agency overview
- Formed: 1985; 41 years ago
- Jurisdiction: Government of Bangladesh
- Headquarters: CAAB Building, Kurmitola, Dhaka-1229
- Agency executive: Air Vice Marshal Md Mostafa Mahmood Siddiq, Chairman
- Parent agency: Ministry of Civil Aviation and Tourism
- Website: www.caab.gov.bd

The Civil Aviation Authority of Bangladesh (Note: Bengali: বেসামরিক বিমান চলাচল কর্তৃপক্ষ বাংলাদেশ, romanized: Besamôrik Biman Côlacôl Kôrtṛpôkṣô Baṅladeś, IPA: [ˈbeʃaˌmoɾik ˈbiman ˈtʃɔlaˌtʃɔl ˈkɔɾt̪ɾiˌpɔkːʰoˑ ˈbaŋlaˌd̪eʃ]) (CAAB) functions as the regulatory body for all aviation related activities in Bangladesh. It is the civil aviation authority operating under the Ministry of Civil Aviation & Tourism. All nine operational airports (three international and six domestic) are operated by the CAAB. A member of International Civil Aviation Organization, it has signed bilateral air transport agreement with 52 states. It is headquartered in Kurmitola, Dhaka.

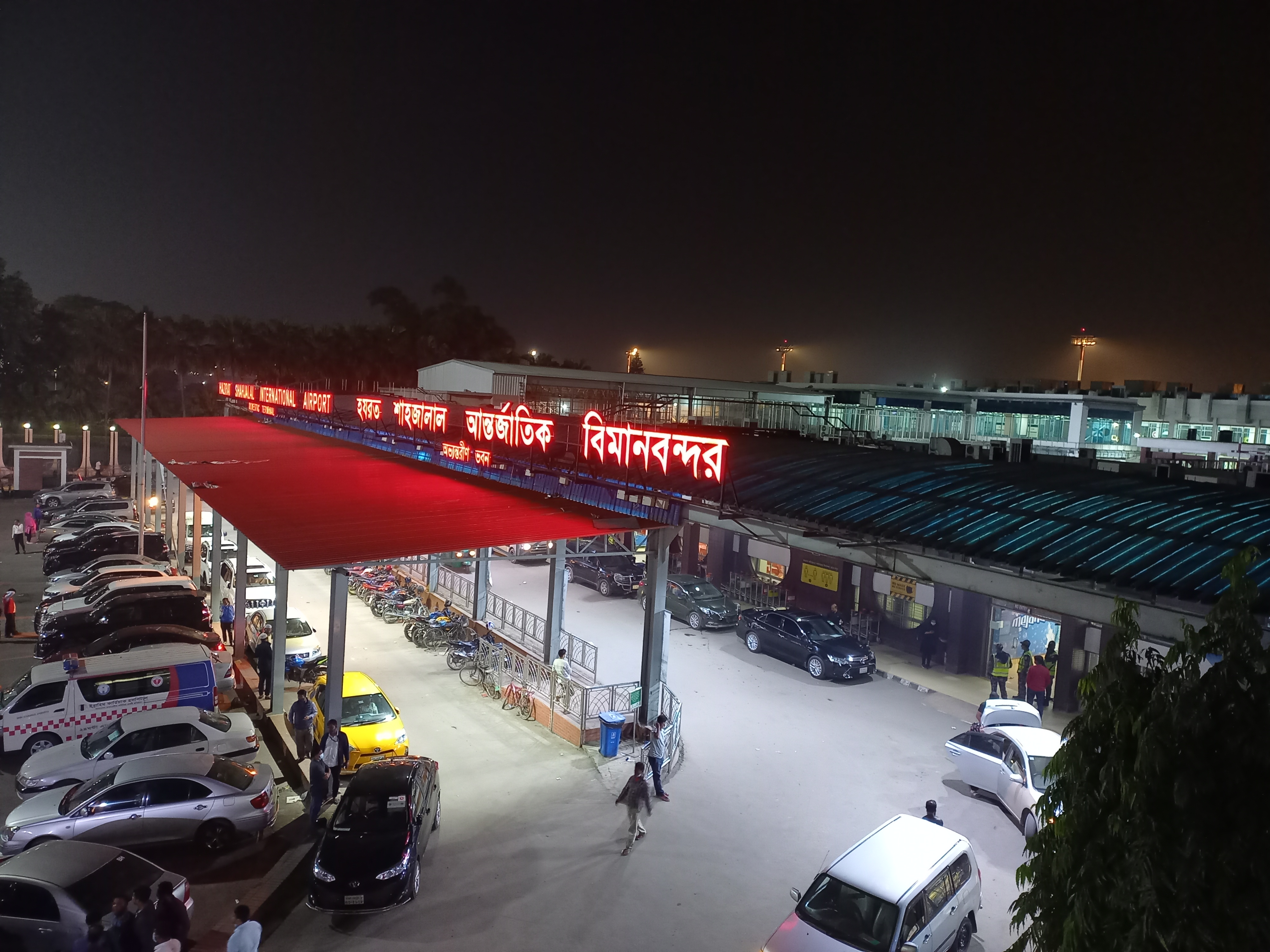
Shahjalal International Airport, Operated and maintained by the Civil Aviation Authority, Bangladesh.

== History ==
=== Pakistan period ===
After the Bangladesh Liberation War of 1971, a Department of Civil Aviation (DCA) was established. Airports Development Agency was a limited company that was working before the Independence of Bangladesh since 1965 and worked as a contractor for the Department of Civil Aviation.

The Department of Civil Aviation and the Airports Development Agency were merged by the government of Bangladesh to create Civil Aviation Authority in 1982.

In 1985, the present Civil Aviation Authority of Bangladesh (CAAB) came into existence as a body corporate with full managerial power, both organisational and financial, vested with it vide Ordinance, 1985. This ordinance repealed Ordinance, 82, dissolved the previously constituted Civil Aviation Authority and transferring all its establishment, assets and liabilities to the new authority.

== Functions ==
As a regulatory body, CAAB implements the rules, regulations and directives of the Government of Bangladesh and the standards and recommendations of the International Civil Aviation Organization (ICAO). As per the provisions laid down in Civil Aviation Ordinance 1960 and Civil Aviation Rules 1984, this organisation acts as the aeronautical authority of Bangladesh and discharges the duties and responsibilities as laid down by ICAO.

=== Flight safety and regulations ===
1. Registration of aircraft: CAAB maintains register for all Bangladeshi aircraft.
2. Certification of Air-worthiness: To ensure flight safety, airworthiness of aircraft must be ensured first. An aircraft can be regarded as airworthy if it and its components conform with design standards, are of approved type and are in sound operational condition. CAAB regularly inspects the aircraft registered in Bangladesh and issues/renews certificate of airworthiness for the worthy aircraft, and suspends/cancels such certificate of unworthy ones. Without such certificate no aircraft should attempt to fly. CAAB also continuously monitors all maintenance activities with Bangladesh aircraft, approves certificate for aircraft type and certificate for maintenance establishments, issues directions regarding maintenance, approves design modification, repair and replacement of any component.
3. Personnel Licensing: Each personnel responsible for flight operations on board – pilot, navigator, flight engineer, flight instructor, air traffic controller etc. – and aircraft maintenance engineer on ground should have appropriate license proving his ability and skill before he engages himself in respective job. CAAB tests and issues/renews licenses to the successful applicants. No member of the aircrew and no maintenance engineer should engage in flying operations and participate in maintenance works respectively without such license.
4. Bi-lateral Agreements: CAAB examines documents submitted by other countries in regard to bilateral Air Services Agreements, negotiations and prepares brief for the Government. Any foreign airline intending to operate scheduled flights in the country must be designated pursuant to such Government level agreements.
5. Air Transport Service Authorisation: CAAB issues/cancels license for Bangladeshi enterprises of air transport services, and approves, revises if required, tariff including fares, rates, charges, commissions, and terms and conditions associated with their business.

=== Air traffic services ===
1. CAAB provides air traffic control service to each aircraft flying in the national airspace and moving on manoeuvring areas of Bangladesh aerodromes to prevent collisions, and to maintain expedite and orderly flow of air traffic.
2. CAAB establishes air routes, and flying, approaching and landing procedures for each route and aerodrome belonging to the country.
3. CAAB makes all necessary arrangements for search and rescue operations in case of accident or missing of any aircraft, and conducts investigations against accidents and unwanted incidents related to aircraft.

=== Communication and navigation ===
CAAB makes provisions for facilities and services for aeronautical telecommunications and air navigation to ensure safety, regularity and efficiency of aircraft operation.

=== Airport and anti-hijack security ===
CAAB makes all necessary arrangements to ensure security to passengers and aerodromes, and to detect, prevent penetration of terrorist activists on board from within national territory.

=== Facilitation of passengers ===
CAAB makes all necessary arrangements to establish and maintain all passenger services and facilities at the terminal of Bangladesh airports. Arrangements for facilities, such as flight information, public address, entertainments, comfortable room and environment for passengers and their attendants are all accomplished by CAAB.

=== Construction and maintenance of airports ===
1. CAAB constructs, maintains and develops airports, aerodromes whenever and wherever are required to expand the aviation infrastructure and air transportation network in the country.
2. CAAB also provides operational accommodation to other organisations and agencies like airlines, Customs, Immigration, Meteorology, Health, Police etc. at the airports.

=== Development planning ===
1. CAAB studies, evaluates and plans for development of the aviation infrastructure within the country considering necessity and budget. It also maintains liaison with regional partners and ICAO in relation to future development programs masterminded by ICAO.
2. CAAB takes all necessary steps for training of its operational officers and employees both domestically and abroad. It also has a Civil Aviation Training Centre in Dhaka.

== List of chairmen ==
SL. #	Name	Term start	Term end	Reference
1	Saiful Azam	6 September 1982	3 September 1984	
2	M Shaukat-ul Islam	4 September 1984	14 September 1987	
3	Saiful Azam	15 September 1987	24 May 1988	
4	Moinul Islam	25 May 1988	28 August 1990	
5	Shameem Hussain	29 August 1990	19 October 1990	
6	Azharul Haq	20 October 1990	22 January 1993	
7	Shamsher Ali	23 January 1993	31 July 1995	
8	Erfan Uddin	1 August 1995	15 February 1997	
9	M Monjoor Alam	16 February 1997	20 September 1998	
10	T A Zearat Ali	21 September 1998	12 December 1999	
11	M Iqbal Hussain	12 December 1999	3 January 2000	
12	M Iqbal Hussain	4 January 2000	21 July 2001	
13	M Murad Hussain	22 July 2001	26 December 2001	
14	Lutfur Rahman	30 December 2001	4 November 2002	
15	Zahed Kuddus	4 November 2002	1 March 2005	
16	A K M Harun Chowdhury	2 March 2005	7 August 2006	
17	Sakeb Iqbal Khan Majlis	8 August 2006	13 January 2009	
18	Mahmud Hussain	14 January 2009	17 March 2009	
19	Sakeb Iqbal Khan Majlis	17 March 2009	18 May 2010	
20	Mahmud Hussain	17 May 2010	11 March 2012	
21	Mahmud Hussain	12 March 2012	21 October 2014	
22	M Sanaul Huq	22 October 2014	27 March 2016	
23	Ehsanul Gani Choudhury	27 March 2016	11 September 2017	
24	M. Naim Hassan	11 September 2017	28 June 2019	
25	Mafidur Rahman	28 June 2019	30 June 2024	
26	Sadikur Rahman Chowdhury	30 June 2024	18 August 2024	
27	Monjur Kabir Bhuiyan	18 August 2024	26 June 2025	
28	Mostofa Mahmud Siddique	2 July 2025	present	

== Aviation training organisations ==
This is a list of Aviation Training Organisations which are approved by the Civil Aviation Authority of Bangladesh.

- Aviation and Aerospace University, Bangladesh
- Biman Bangladesh Airlines Training Center
- Military Institute of Science and Technology
- Aeronautical Institute of Bangladesh
- Bangladesh Air Force Academy
- Aeronautical College of Bangladesh. Under German civil aviation.
- United college of aviation science and management. Under German civil aviation.
- Bangladesh Flying Academy
- Galaxy Flying Academy
