= Monjur Kabir Bhuiyan =

Bangladesh Air Force officer

Monjur Kabir Bhuiyan BBP, BSP, BUP, ndu, afwc, psc

Chairman of Civil Aviation Authority of Bangladesh
- In office 18 August 2024 – 26 June 2025
- Prime Minister: Muhammad Yunus (acting)
- Preceded by: Sadikur Rahman Chowdhury
- Succeeded by: Mostofa Mahmud Siddique

Personal details
- Born: East Pakistan, Pakistan
- Education: Bangladesh Air Force Academy

Military service
- Allegiance: Bangladesh
- Branch/service: Bangladesh Air Force
- Years of service: 1989–present
- Rank: Air Vice Marshal
- Unit: No. 9 Squadron
- Commands: AOC of Air Operation Center; AOC of BAF Base Matiur Rahman; AOC of BAF Base Zahurul Haque; AOC of BAF Base Bir Uttam Sultan Mahmud; Chairman of Civil Aviation Authority of Bangladesh

Muhammad Monjur Kabir Bhuiyan is a Bangladesh Air Force officer and air officer commanding of the Air Operation Center. He is a former chairman of the Civil Aviation Authority, Bangladesh. Prior to that appointment, he was the air officer commanding at two air bases: BAF Base Zahurul Haque, Patenga, Chattogram, and BAF Base Bir Uttam Sultan Mahmud, Paharkanchanpur.

== Career ==
Bhuiyan received his commission in the Bangladesh Air Force on 2 July 1989. He graduated from the Defence Services Command and Staff College and completed the Senior Command and Staff Course in Pakistan.

Bhuiyan commanded the BAF Base Bir Uttam Sultan Mahmud. He served as the director of overseas air operations and the director of the Cyber Warfare and IT Directorate. He was the officer commanding of the Air Defense Operation Center. He is a former pro vice-chancellor of the Bangabandhu Sheikh Mujibur Rahman Aviation and Aerospace University.

After the fall of the Sheikh Hasina-led Awami League government, Bhuiyan was appointed chairman of the Civil Aviation Authority, Bangladesh. He replaced Sadikur Rahman Chowdhury as chairman of the Civil Aviation Authority, Bangladesh. Before that, he was the commander of BAF Base Zahurul Haque.

In June 2025, Bhuiyan was terminated and transferred to the Armed Forces Division.

== Personal life ==
Bhuiyan is married to Ferdaus Nahar, an artist of Bangladesh Betar.
