= Bangladesh Navy Hydrographic & Oceanographic Center =

Bangladeshi agency

Agency overview
- Formed: 1983
- Headquarters: New Mooring, Chattogram—4218
- Agency executive: Commodore Sheikh Firoz Ahamed, Bn Chief Hydrographer
- Website: bnhoc.navy.mil.bd

BN Hydrographic & Oceanographic Center (BNHOC) is an agency for producing, procuring and distributing navigational charts, publications, Electronics Navigational Charts (ENC), BN Tide Table, BN BM Book to BN ships and establishments as well as maintenance of hydrographic, oceanographic, cartographic, meteorological and data processing instruments or equipment. It is the core establishment of the Hydrographic Department and are located in New Mooring, Chattogram. Commodore Commodore Sheikh Firoz Ahamed is the Chief Hydrographer of Bangladesh Navy Hydrographic & Oceanographic Center.

== History ==
In 1983, BN Hydrographic Department was established as the Hydrographic School at BNS Issa Khan. After that in 1996, the Bangladesh Navy with support from the French government has modernized under the Hydro Bangla Project-1. After 5 years, Hydro Bangla Project-2 was completed and Bangladesh Navy Hydrographic & Oceanographic Center was established in 2001. BNHOC received prestigious membership of International Hydrographic Organization (IHO) in the year of 2001.
