= BNS Issa Khan =

Naval base of the Bangladeshi Navy

Coordinates: 22°17′1.43″N 91°47′29.85″E

- Chittagong, Chittagong Division, Bangladesh
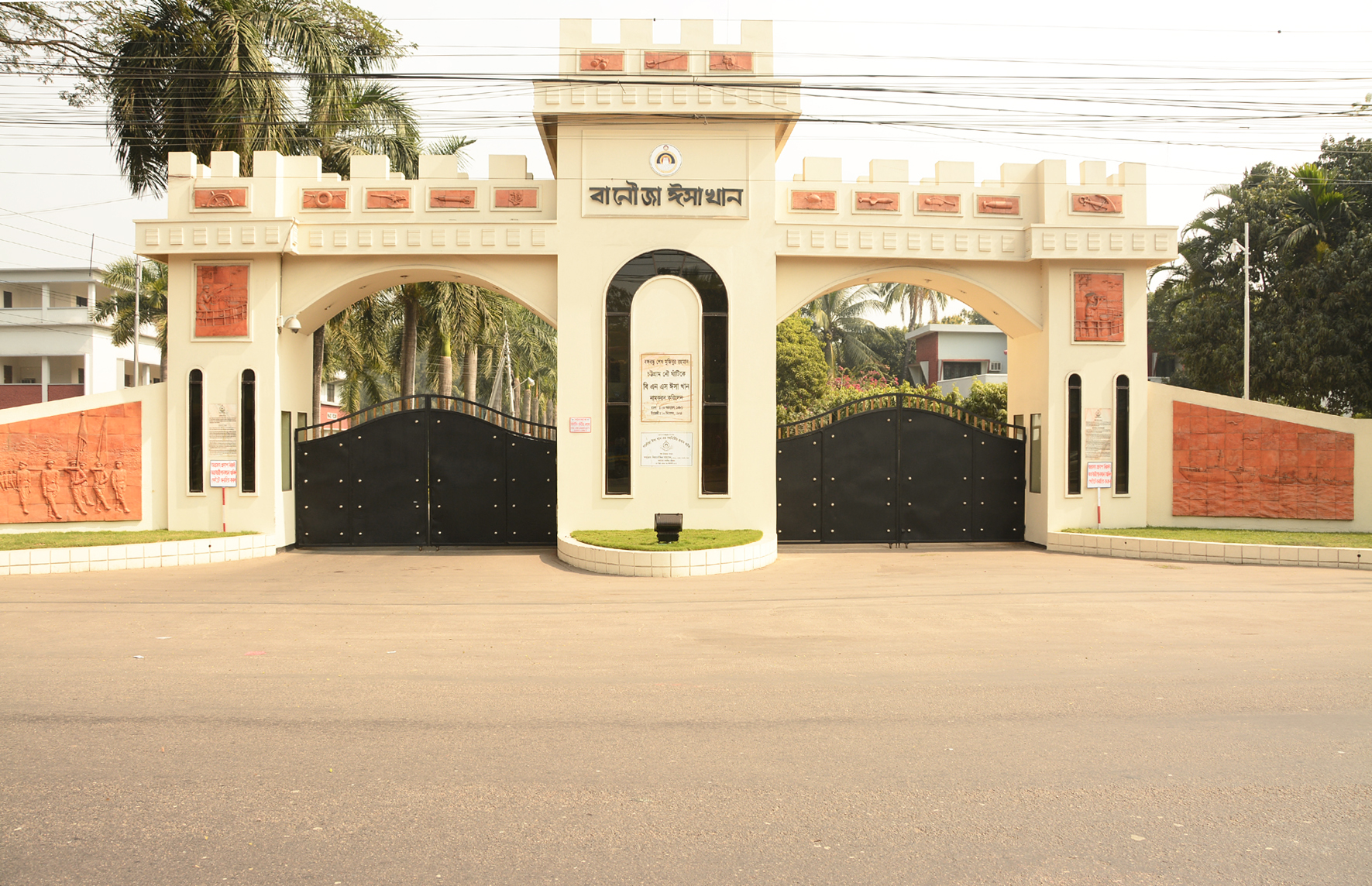
- The main entrance gate to BNS Issa Khan

Site information
- Type: Naval base
- Controlled by: Bangladesh Navy

Site history
- Built: 1974
- In use: 1974 - Present

Garrison information
- Current commander: Rear Admiral Mir Ershad Ali

BNS Issa Khan is a naval base of the Bangladeshi Navy in Chittagong district of Bangladesh. It is the second largest base of Bangladesh Navy.

== History ==
Before the Bangladesh Liberation War, the naval base was named as PNS Bakhtiar. After independence the base was named BNS Chittagong. Later, on December 10, 1974, Chittagong naval base was renamed as BNS Issa Khan by former Prime Minister of Bangladesh Sheikh Mujibur Rahman, named after the medieval Baro-Bhuyan chieftain Isa Khan. On 8 November 2016 President Abdul Hamid awarded National Standard to BNS Issa Khan.

The BNS Issa Khan is currently under the command of the Commander Chattagram Naval Area (COMCHIT). About 1800 personnel serve at Isa Khan. Issa Khan was established for the training of officers and sailors, as well as operating as a naval base. Several training schools are located here.

== See also ==
- List of active Bangladesh Navy ships
- Bangladesh Navy Hydrographic & Oceanographic Center
- Isa Khan of Bengal
