= Bangladesh Navy =

Naval warfare branch of the Bangladesh Armed Forces

- বাংলাদেশ নৌবাহিনী Bāṅlādēś Nôubāhinī
- Crest of the Bangladesh Navy
- Founded: 10 July 1971
- Country: Bangladesh
- Type: Navy
- Role: Naval warfare
- Size: 27,500 personnel
- Part of: Bangladesh Armed Forces
- Naval Headquarters: Naval Headquarters (NHQ), Banani, Dhaka
- Nickname: BN
- Mottos: শান্তিতে সংগ্রামে সমুদ্রে দুর্জয় Śāntitē Sôṅgrāmē Sômudrē Durjôẏ ("In War and Peace Invincible at Sea")
- Colors: Service uniform: White, Black; Combat uniform: Crayola's Cadet Blue, Black Coral, Rainbow Indigo, Gunmetal
- Equipment: List of equipment of the Bangladesh Navy
- Engagements: List: Bangladesh Liberation War; Operation Jackpot; 2008 Bangladesh–Myanmar naval standoff; Operation Devil Hunt
- Website: www.navy.mil.bd

Commanders
- Commander-in-chief: President Mirza Fakhrul Islam Alamgir
- Chief of Naval Staff: Admiral Khondkar Misbah-ul-Azim

Insignia
- Flag

- Ensign

- Jack

- Roundel

Aircraft flown
- Helicopter: AW-109E Power
- Patrol: Dornier 228NG

The Bangladesh Navy (Bengali: বাংলাদেশ নৌবাহিনী, romanized: Bānlādeś Noubāhinī; abbreviated as BN) is the naval warfare branch of the Bangladesh Armed Forces, responsible for defending the maritime interests and territorial waters of Bangladesh. Operating under the Ministry of Defence, the Navy conducts maritime security, naval defense, surveillance, and disaster relief operations. Established after the 1971 Liberation War, the Bangladesh Navy has developed into a modern and professional force, actively participating in United Nations peacekeeping operations and regional maritime security initiatives. The Bangladesh Navy today is typically categorized as a green-water navy both domestically and internationally.

== History ==
=== Origins ===
The Bangladesh Navy was created as part of Bangladesh Forces during Bangladesh's 1971 liberation war against Pakistan. Its official creation date is July 1971, during the Bangladesh Sector Commanders Conference 1971. In 1971, with West Pakistan imposing a brutal military crackdown in East Pakistan, the Bangladesh Liberation War was already underway. Many Bengali sailors and officers in the Pakistan Navy defected to form the nascent Bangladesh Navy. Initially, there were two ships, PADMA and PALASH, and 45 navy personnel. On 9 November 1971, the first naval fleet, consisting of six small patrol vessels, was inaugurated. These ships attempted to carry out raids on the Pakistani fleet, but were mistakenly hit and sunk by the Indian Air Force on 10 December 1971. The next major attack was launched on Mongla seaport. According to official figures from the Bangladesh Navy, a total of 334 sailors were involved with the newly created navy, with 22 being killed in action.

=== Independence to the end of the 20th century ===
The navy carried out around 45 operations during the war: traditional naval operations and unconventional commando operations, including guerrilla warfare. In the first leg of the war, defecting Bengali sailors joined the guerrilla forces. It was the eight sailors who defected from the Pakistan Navy submarine PNS Mangro, under construction in France, that pioneered the formation of the naval element during the Liberation War. Later many other naval personnel participated. During the Liberation War, East Pakistan was divided into 11 sectors. Each sector had a commander and a demarcated area of responsibility except sector 10. Sector 10 was nominally responsible for the coastal belt but actually operated over the entire country.

In 1971, it was imperative for the occupation force to keep ports and harbours operative and the sea lines of communication open. The Bangladesh Navy fought to block the sea lines of communication and to make the sea and river ports inoperative. They attacked all the seaports, including many river ports. Operation Jackpot is one of the best known and most successful operations. They carried out mining in the Pasur River Channel by patrol craft. With other fighters, they also carried out attacks against the Pakistan Army. As a result, Bangladesh became an independent state within the shortest possible time.

After independence, especially in the 1970s, additional naval infrastructure was required. Two ex-Royal Navy frigates joined the Bangladesh Navy as BNS Umar Farooq and BNS Ali Haider in 1976 and 1978, respectively. In 1982, a third ex-Royal Navy frigate joined the BN as BNS Abu Bakr. The acquisition of these three frigates is considered the principal foundation of the Bangladesh Navy.

=== 21st century ===
In 2011, the Bangladesh Navy's rescue and medical team, along with the Bangladesh Army, was deployed to Japan after the Tōhoku earthquake and tsunami. The Bangladesh Navy has been an active disaster recovery force abroad. In 2013, the navy deployed BNS Somudra Joy carrying humanitarian assistance worth $1 million. The Bangladesh Navy's medical team was also deployed to the Philippines.

The Bangladesh Navy joined in the search operation for missing Malaysia Airlines Flight 370 with BNS Khalid bin Walid, BNS Umar Faruq, and a Dornier 228NG MPA in March 2014. The aircraft was a Boeing 777-200ER which had gone missing with 12 Malaysian crew members and 227 passengers from 14 nations during the flight from Malaysia to China. Later, BNS Umar Farooq was replaced by BNS Somudra Joy. The search was renewed in May 2014, when an Australian exploration company claimed to have traced aircraft debris in the Bay of Bengal. In 2014, during the water crisis in the Maldives, the Bangladesh Navy was the first to launch humanitarian aid relief by deploying BNS Somudra Joy with 100 tonnes of bottled water.

=== Forces Goal 2030 ===
In 2009, the Bangladesh government adopted a long-term modernisation plan for its armed forces called Forces Goal 2030. As of 2013, about a third of the military hardware procured under the plan has been for the navy. It procured two refurbished Type 053H2 (Jianghu III) frigates from China in 2014. Two United States Coast Guard High Endurance Cutters joined the BN in 2013 and 2015 which are being used as patrol frigates. The navy also bought an ex-Royal Navy Roebuck-class survey vessel and two ex-Royal Navy Castle-class offshore patrol vessels (OPVs) which were converted to guided missile corvettes in 2011. Two Type 056 corvettes joined the BN in 2016, while two more were ordered in July 2015, and they are awaiting commissioning. Two Durjoy-class large patrol craft (LPCs) were built in China and joined the BN in 2013. Two more ships of the same class with dedicated ASW capabilities were commissioned in 2017. Five Padma-class patrol vessels have been commissioned into the navy in 2013. Besides, multiple indigenous built LCUs and LCTs have been added to the navy. This marks a new chapter in maritime capability as part of the vision for a Smart Bangladesh by 2041.

The Bangladesh Navy opened its aviation wing on 14 July 2011 with the induction of two AgustaWestland AW109 helicopters. Later on, two Dornier 228NG MPAs were introduced in 2013. To attain underwater operational capabilities, the Bangladesh Navy inducted two off-the-shelf Type 035G (Ming class) submarines from China on 12 March 2017.

The Bangladesh Navy,has been continuously growing its fleet. By 2020, it had more than 100 small and large ships across different classes, and is producing warships within its borders. The naval force of Bangladesh is continually strengthening its maritime capabilities through expansion efforts.

A new base for the Bangladesh Navy, named BNS Sher-e-Bangla, is being constructed at Rabanabad in Patuakhali. It will be the largest naval base of the Bangladesh Navy with submarine berthing and aviation facilities. A full-fledged South Asian largest submarine base, named BNS Pekua, was commissioned 19 March 2023 at Pekua in Cox's Bazar. A full-fledged naval base, named BNS Dhaka, has been commissioned in Khilkhet, Dhaka. Dhaka naval area.

=== UN missions, multinational exercises and naval diplomacy ===
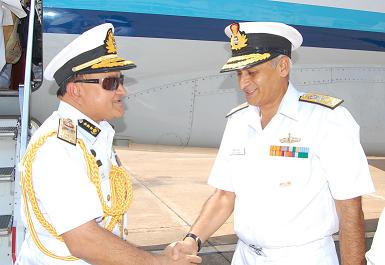
Vice Admiral Zahir Uddin Ahmed received by the Vice Chief of Naval Staff of the Indian Navy, Vice Admiral Sunil Lanba

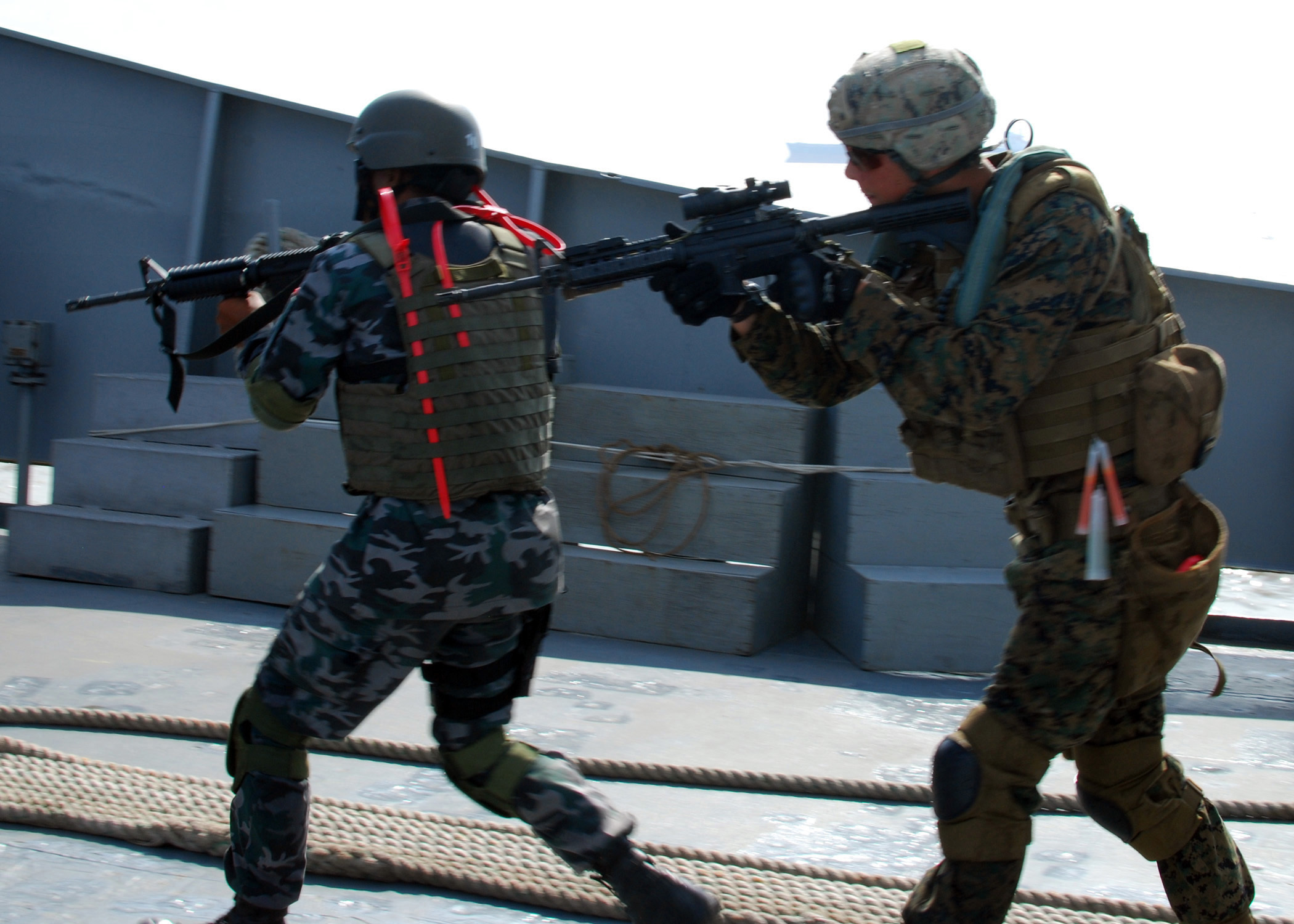
A U.S. Marine assigned to Fleet Anti-terrorism Security Team Pacific and a Bangladesh Navy sailor with Special Warfare Diving and Salvage Command engage the enemy during a noncompliant boarding exercise aboard the Bangladesh Navy offshore patrol vessel BNS Sangu (P 713) during Cooperation Afloat Readiness and Training (CARAT) 2012.

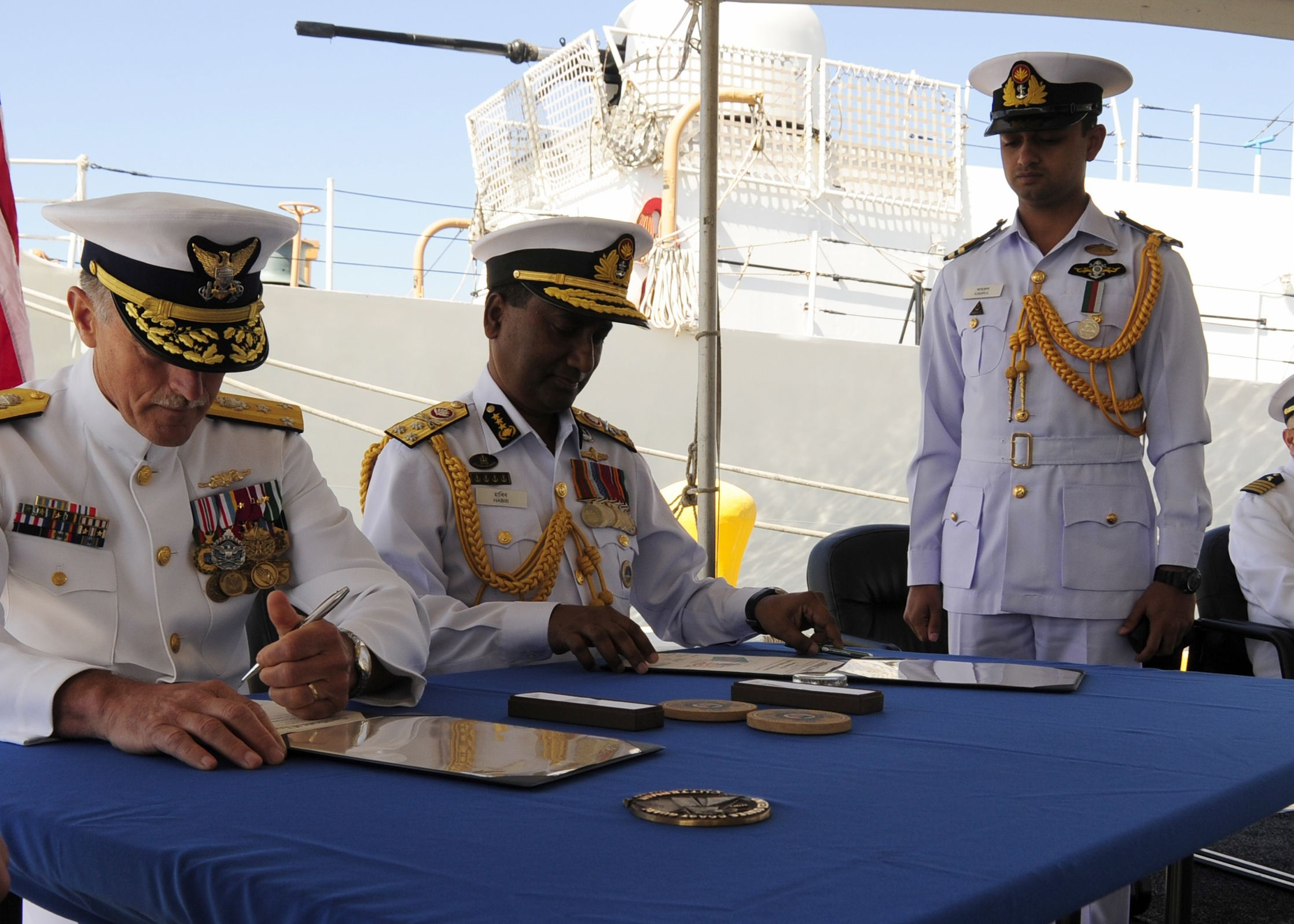
BN Chief Vice Admiral M. Farid Habib with Vice Adm. Paul F. Zukunft, commander of the United States Coast Guard Pacific Area

In 1993, the Bangladesh Navy joined United Nations Peacekeeping Operations. Its first UN mission came in 2005, when a Bangladesh Navy contingent was sent to Sudan as Force Riverine Unit (FRU). The Bangladesh Navy joined the United Nations Interim Force in Lebanon (UNIFIL) in 2010, deploying two ships to the Mediterranean Sea, the frigate BNS Osman and the patrol craft BNS Madhumati. They were replaced in June 2014 by frigate BNS Ali Haider and patrol craft BNS Nirmul. Corvette BNS Bijoy took over from them in 2018, and was in turn replaced by corvette BNS Sangram in 2020.

BN ships regularly participate in exercises with other navies, gaining valuable experience and improving their fighting capabilities. CARAT is a yearly exercise conducted with the United States Navy in the Bay of Bengal since 2011. The BN has sent an OPV to every MILAN multinational naval exercise held near the Andaman Islands since 2010. AMAN, another multinational exercise held every two years in the Arabian Sea, organised by the Pakistan Navy, has also seen participation by BN frigates since 2009. BNS Bangabandhu participated in Exercise Ferocious Falcon, a Multinational Crisis Management Exercise, held at Doha, Qatar, in November 2012, while BNS Somudra Joy participated in the same exercise in 2015. BNS Abu Bakr took part in the 14th Western Pacific Naval Symposium and International Fleet Review-2014 in Qingdao, Shandong Province of China in April 2014. She also participated in the Langkawi International Maritime and Aerospace Exhibition (LIMA-2015) held in Malaysia.

== Exercise Somudro Ghurni ==
Somudro Ghurni (Sea Vortex)
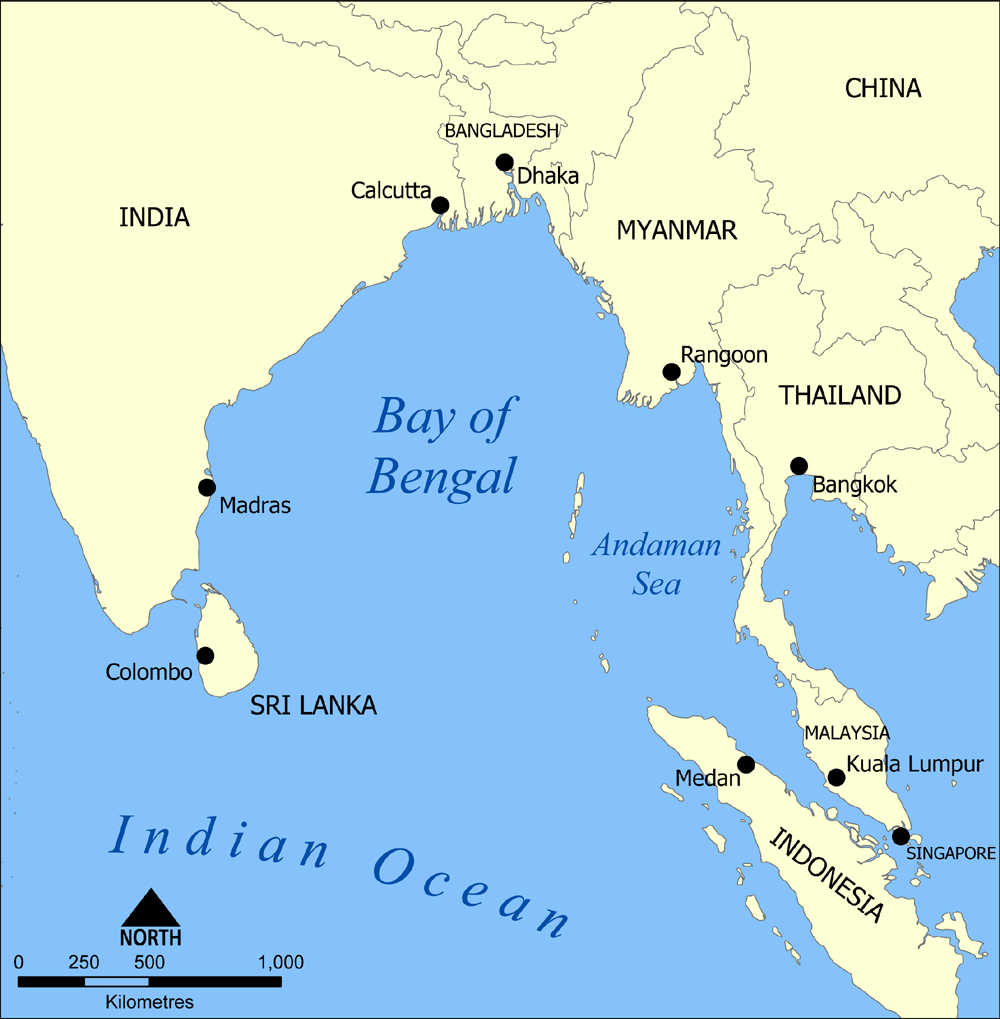
- Type: Bangladesh Navy Naval exercise
- Location: Bay of Bengal
- Planned by: Naval Operations Branch
- Objective: Deployment of Bangladesh Navy and Special Operation Forces.
- Date: 16 November 2015 – 30 November 2015
- Executed by: Commodore Khaled Iqbal, COMFLOT-W

Somudro Ghurni (Bengali: সমুদ্রঘূর্ণি English: Sea Vortex) is the codename of a series of major naval exercises conducted by the Bangladesh Navy to simulate naval warfare and the protection of the country from external maritime threats, protection of the country's maritime resources, and prevention of smuggling.

=== Overview ===
The exercise took place in the Bay of Bengal. It started on 16 November 2015 and lasted 15 days. During the exercise, the navy deployed most of its fleet, including frigates, corvettes, and maritime patrol aircraft. The exercise included search and rescue, logistical, maritime patrol, landing, and warfare exercises. During the exercise, the Navy successfully test launched missiles.

== Administration and organisation ==
Bangladesh Navy (BN) has its headquarters at Banani, Dhaka. According to the Constitution of Bangladesh, the president of Bangladesh is the commander-in chief of Bangladesh Armed Forces. The Chief of Naval Staff (CNS), a four-star admiral, is the highest admiral, directs the non-combat and combatant operations from the Naval Headquarters (NHQ) in Dhaka. The headquarters has four branches: operations (O), personnel (P), material (M), and logistics (Log). Each branch is headed by officers who are titled as principal staff officer (PSO) and known as assistant chief of naval staff (ACNS), e.g., ACNS (O). Under each PSO there are various directorates headed by directors with the rank of commodore or captain. Under each director there are deputy directors (DD) and staff officers (SO). The Bangladesh Navy has ten major combatant commands; each command is commanded by a rear admiral or commodore, who directly reports to Chief of Naval Staff.

=== Naval headquarters formation ===
Appointment	Rank & Name	Star Plate
Chief of Naval Staff	Admiral Khondkar Misbah-ul-Azim, NBP, NPP	
Assistant Chief of Naval Staff (Operations)	Rear Admiral Golam Sadeq, NBP, NGP	
Assistant Chief of Naval Staff (Personnel)	Rear Admiral Khandakar Akhter Hossain	
Assistant Chief of Naval Staff (Materiel)	Rear Admiral Mohammad Maksud Alam, BSP, NUP, BCGM, BCGMS	
Assistant Chief of Naval Staff (Logistics)	Rear Admiral Shafiqur Rahman, NUP	

=== Area commanders and administrative authority ===
Appointment	Rank & Name	Star Plate
Commander Dhaka Naval Area	Rear Admiral Abdullah Al Maksus, NBP, NGP	
Commander Chittagong Naval Area	Rear Admiral	
Commander Khulna Naval Area	Rear Admiral A K M Jakir Hossain, ndc, afwc, psc	
Commander Bangladesh Navy Fleet	Rear Admiral Mushtaque Ahmed, NPP	
Commandant Naval Training & Doctrine Command	Rear Admiral Jahangir Adil Samdany, NGP, ndc, psc	
Area Superintendent Dockyard	Rear Admiral Ruhul Minhaz, OSP	
Commander Flotilla West	Commodore M Hasan Tarique Mondal, NPP, ndc, psc, BN	
Commodore Bangladesh Naval Aviation	Commodore Waseem Maqsood (G), BCGM, ndu, psc	
Commander Submarine	Commodore	
Chief Hydrographer	Commodore Sheikh Firoz Ahmed, NGP	
Commodore Special Warfare Diving and Salvage Command	Commodore Fazlar Rahman (TAS) NGP, ndc, afwc, psc	

== Rank structure ==
=== Commissioned officers ===
Rank group	General / flag officers				Senior officers			Junior officers
Bangladesh Navy
Bangladesh Navy	এ্যাডমিরাল; Aeḍmirāl	ভাইস এ্যাডমিরাল; Bhā'is aeḍamirāl	রিয়ার এ্যাডমিরাল; Riẏār aeḍamirāl	কমোডোর; Kômōḍōr	ক্যাপ্টেন; Kaepṭēn	কমান্ডার; Kômānḍār	লেফটেন্যান্ট কমান্ডার; Lēphṭēnānṭ kômānḍār	লেফটেন্যান্ট; Lēphṭēnānṭ	সাব-লেফটেন্যান্ট; Sāb-lēphṭēnānṭ	এ্যাক্টিং সাব-লেফটেন্যান্ট; Ēyākṭiṁ sāb-lēphṭēn'yānṭ	মিডশিপম্যান; Miḍśipmaen

=== Other ranks ===
Rank group	Junior commissioned officers			Non-commissioned officer	Enlisted
Bangladesh Navy						No insignia	No insignia
Bangladesh Navy	মাস্টার চীফ পেটি অফিসার; Māsṭār chīph pēṭi ôphisār	সিনিয়র চীফ পেটি অফিসার; Siniẏar chīph pēṭi ôphisār	চীফ পেটি অফিসার; Chīph pēṭi ôphisār	পেটি অফিসার; Pēṭi ôphisār	লিডিং সীম্যান; Liḍiṁ sīmaen	এ্যাবল সীম্যান; Ēyābal sīmaen	অর্ডিনারী সিম্যান; Ôrḍinārī simaen

=== D & R ===
Serial & Branch	Seaman	Communication	Mechanical	Secretariat	Supply	Electrical	Radio Electrical	Regulating	Medical
01	OD (Ordinary Seaman)	RO(G)-II	ME II	WTR II (Writer II)	SA II (Store Assistant II)	EN II	REN II	NP II (Naval Provost II)	MA II (Medical Assistant II)
02	AB (Able Seaman)	RO(G)-I	ME I	WTR I (Writer I)	SA I (Store Assistant I)	EN I	REN I	NP I (Naval Provost I)	MA I (Medical Assistant I)
03	LS (Leading Seaman)	LRO(G)	LME	LWTR	LSA	LEN	LREN	LNP (Leading Naval Provost)	LMA
04	PO (Petty Officer)	PORS(G)	ERA-IV	PO(W) {Petty Officer(Writer)}	PO(S) {Petty Officer(Store)}	EA-IV	REA-IV	PO(R) {Petty Officer(Regulating)}	PO(Med) {Petty Officer(Medical)}
05	CPO (Chief Petty Officer)	CRS(G)	ERA-I/II/III	CPO(W) {Chief Petty Officer(Writer)}	CPO(S) {Chief Petty Officer(Store)}	EA-I/II/III	REA-I/II/III	MAA (Master at Arm)	CPO(Med) {Chief Petty Officer(Medical)}
06	SCPO (Senior Chief Petty Officer)	SCPO(COM)	SCPO(E) {Senior Chief Petty Officer(Engineering)}	SCPO(W) {Senior Chief Petty Officer(Writer)}	SCPO(S) {Senior Chief Petty Officer(Store)}	SCPO(L) {Senior Chief Petty Officer(Electrical)}	SCPO(R) {Senior Chief Petty Officer(Radio Electrical)}	SCPO(Reg) {Senior Chief Petty Officer(Regulating)}	SCPO(Med) {Senior Chief Petty Officer(Medical)}
07	MCPO (Master Chief Petty Officer)	MCPO(COM)	MCPO(E) {Master Chief Petty Officer(Engineering)}	MCPO(S) {Master Chief Petty Officer(Supply)}	MCPO(S) {Master Chief Petty Officer(Supply)}	MCPO(L)/CEA {Master Chief Petty Officer(Electrical)}	MCPO(R)/CREA {Master Chief Petty Officer(Radio Electrical)}	MCPO(Reg){Master Chief Petty Officer(Regulating)}	MCPO(Med) {Master Chief Petty Officer(Medical)}
08	Honorary Sub Lieutenant(X)	Honorary Sub Lieutenant(COM)	Hon S Lt(E)	Hon S Lt(S)	Hon S Lt(S)	Hon S Lt(L)	Hon S Lt(R)	Hon S Lt(Reg)	Hon S Lt(W/M)
09	Honorary Lieutenant(X)	Honorary Lieutenant(COM)	Hon Lt(E)	Hon Lt(S)	Hon Lt(S)	Hon Lt(L)	Hon Lt(R)	Hon Lt(Reg)	Hon Lt(W/M)

== List of bases ==
Dhaka	Chittagong	Khulna	Barisal
Naval Headquarters; BNS Haji Mohshin; BNS Dhaka	BNS Issa Khan; BNS Shaheed Moazzem; BN Dockyard; BNS Ulka; BNS Pekua; BNS Bhatiary; BNS Nirvik; SS Dockyard Pekua; BNS Bashanchor	BNS Titumir; BNS Mongla; Mongla Dockyard; SOLAM; BNS Upasham	BNS Sher-e-Bangla

== Training institutes ==
The Bangladesh Naval Academy is the home of naval cadets to be the future officers of Bangladesh Navy. The academy provides education, athletic and military training to the naval cadets. The academy also offers training programs to the officers of allied navies including navy personnel from Qatar, Sri Lanka, Maldivian and Palestinian Navy. Naval Training and Doctrine Command in Barishal is also the premier institute for naval officers.

== Equipment ==
=== Vessels ===
As of November 2025, the Bangladesh Navy has five guided missile frigates, two patrol frigates, two submarines, six corvettes, thirty-eight minor surface combatants of various types (including patrol vessels, missile boats, and mine hunters), and thirty auxiliaries as surface assets. On 12 March 2017, the Bangladesh Navy established a submarine force with the commissioning of two refurbished diesel-electric Type 035G (Ming class) attack submarines. They carry 57 personnel and 16 torpedoes with the option of loading 32 mines as well.

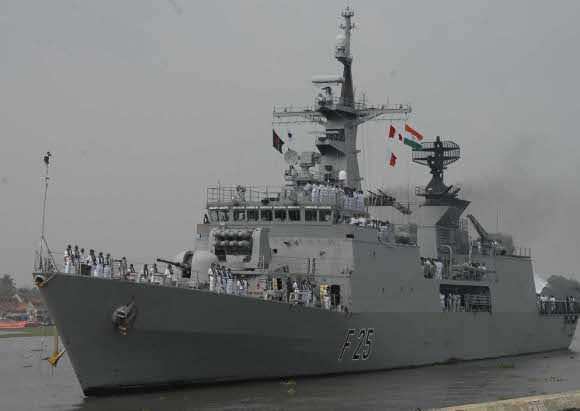
Personnel aboard BNS Khalid Bin Walid

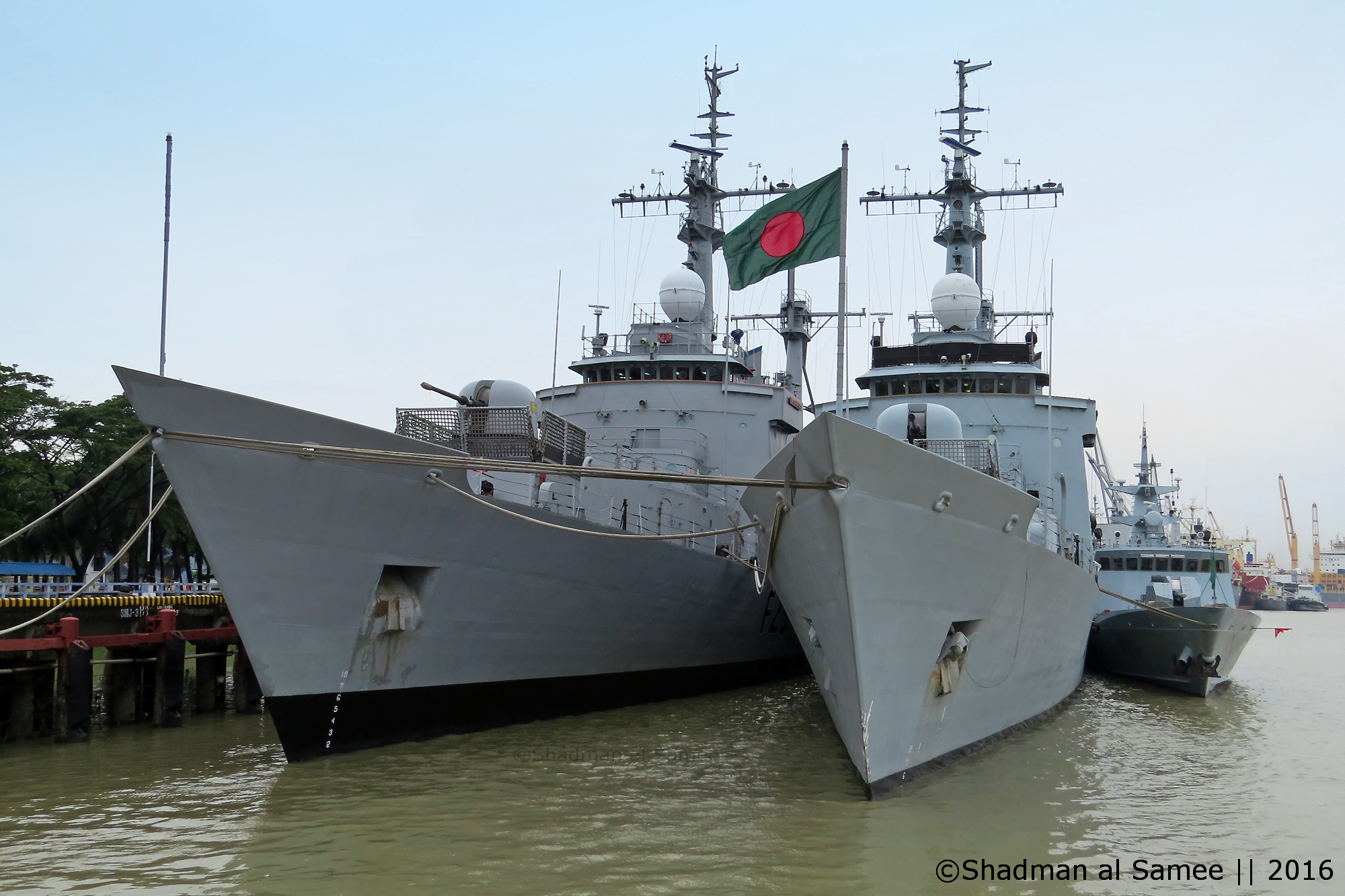
BNS Issa Khan 2016: BNS Somudro Joy (F28), BNS Somudra Avijan (F29), and BNS Nirmul (P813) side by side.

==== Ships ====
Type	Number of ships	Notes
Frigate	7	Two of these are patrol frigates.
Corvette	6	
Submarine	2	
Large patrol craft	5	
Offshore patrol vessel	5	
Inshore patrol vessel	12	
Fast attack craft-missile	4	Rearmed with C-704 AShM.
Fast Attack craft-ASW	4	
Fast attack craft-gun	5	
Minesweeper	5	Mainly used as offshore patrol vessels.
Survey ship	2	
Amphibious warfare	15	
Repair ship	1	
Tanker	2	
Floating dock	1	
Auxiliaries	11	
Dive Boat	3	

=== Aircraft ===
Aircraft in service with the Bangladesh Navy is organized in the naval aviation wing, which operates both fixed-wing aircraft and rotorcraft.

=== Infantry Equipment ===
The navy also maintains a special operations force named SWADS.

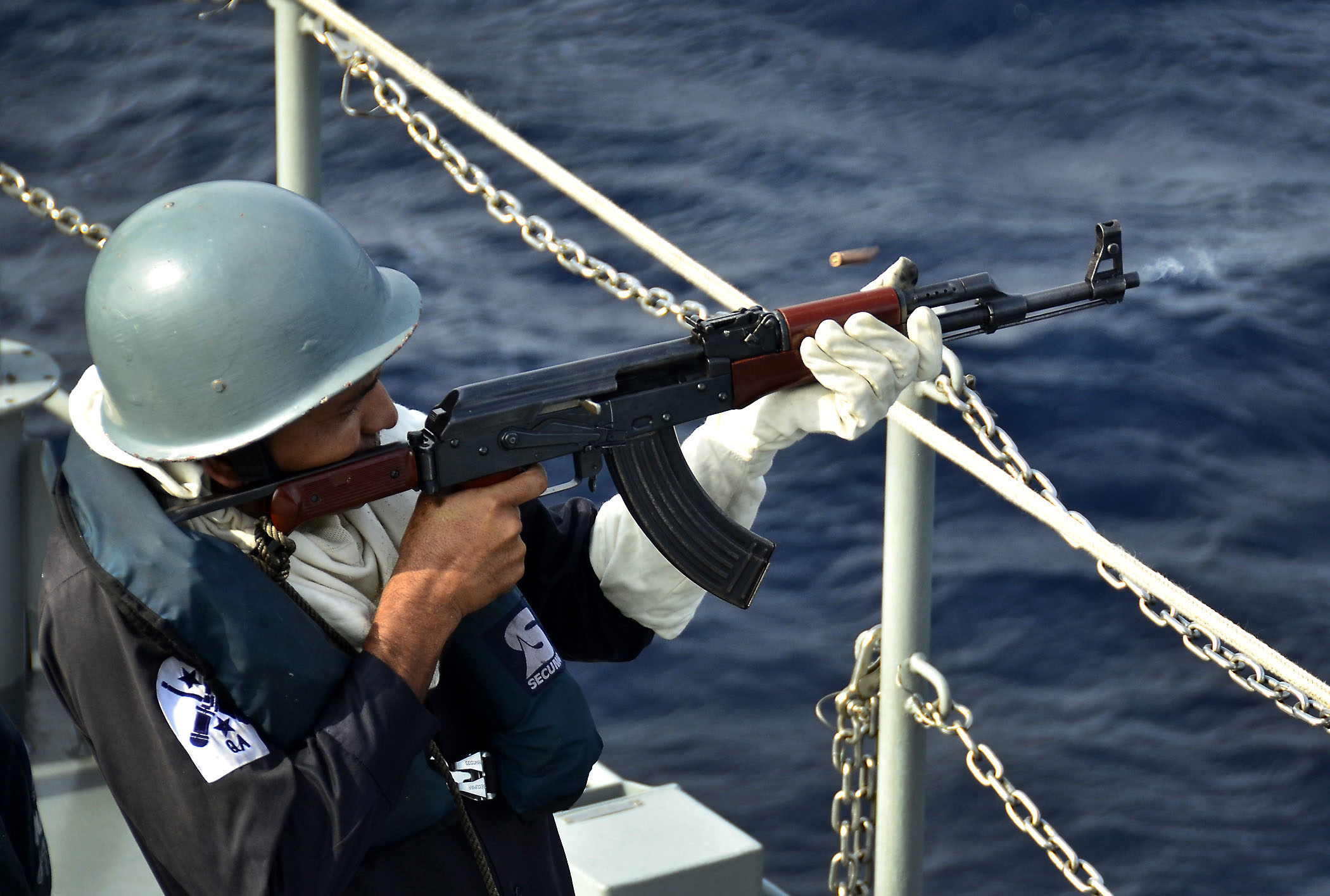
A Bangladesh navy sailor fires a Type-56 assault rifle aboard the Bangladesh navy frigate BNS Bangabandhu (F 25)

== Future modernization plans ==
Bangladesh has made a long term modernisation plan for its armed forces named Forces Goal 2030. The plan includes the modernization and expansion of all equipment and infrastructure and providing enhanced training. The Bangladesh Navy is setting up a new base at Rabanabad in Patuakhali named BNS Sher-e-Bangla, which will be the largest naval base in the country. The base will have submarine berthing and aviation facilities. A separate submarine base named BNS Pekua is under construction at Pekua in Cox's Bazar. The construction works of a fleet headquarters at the Sandwip channel of Chittagong with ship berthing facilities is already going on.

Khulna Shipyard, with the collaboration of China's Hudong-Zhonghua Shipbuilding, built five padma-class patrol vessels that entered navy service in 2013. In December 2019, they laid the keels for a further five, four of which had been delivered to the navy by February 2024. The navy commissioned two survey ships built by Khulna Shipyard, the BNS Darshak and BNS Tallashi, on 5 November 2020. The same shipyard delivered two survey boats to the navy in October 2021.

BN has issued two tenders for the procurement of four helicopters with anti-submarine warfare (ASW), anti-surface vessel warfare (ASuW), over-the-horizon targeting (OTHT), maritime search and rescue (MSAR), medical evacuation (MEDEVAC), casualty evacuation (CASEVAC), and special mission capabilities. A contract was signed for two maritime patrol aircraft on 27 March 2017.

Bangladesh Navy issued a tender for the supply of a Technical Data Link (TDL) system. The system will connect 16 platforms as 2 frigates, 4 corvettes, 1 LPC, 3 shore stations, 2 helicopters, 2 MPAs and 2 submarines. In April 2018, the Bangladesh Navy issued a tender for two X-band navigational radars with helicopter landing control facilities for two of its ships. At the same time, another tender was issued for replacing two 40 mm Fast Forty guns on-board BNS Khalid bin Walid with a new 40 mm twin-barrel gun system.

In December 2019, the prime minister discussed the past, present, and future development programs for the Bangladesh Navy at the winter passing out parade of the Bangladesh Naval Academy. She said that the process is going on for procuring more corvettes, minesweepers, oceanographic research ship and sail training ship. The process of constructing six frigates at Chittagong Dry Dock in collaboration with foreign shipbuilders is also going on. Government has taken initiative for making missiles and Identification friend or foe system in Bangladesh. She added that, there is a plan to induct more maritime patrol aircraft, anti-submarine warfare helicopters and long range MPA in the near future.

== See also ==
- Bangladesh Army
- Bangladesh Air Force
- Bangladesh Coast Guard
- Bangladesh National Cadet Corps (BNCC)
- Bangladesh Navy football team
