= Bangladesh Armed Forces =

Combined military forces of Bangladesh

- বাংলাদেশ সশস্ত্র বাহিনী
- Crest of Bangladesh Armed Forces

- Flag of Bangladesh Armed Forces
- Motto: চির উন্নত মম শির (de facto) ("Ever High is My Head")
- Founded: 21 November 1971; 54 years ago
- Current form: 12 January 1972; 54 years ago
- Service branches: Bangladesh Army; Bangladesh Navy; Bangladesh Air Force
- Headquarters: Armed Forces Division Headquarters, Dhaka Cantonment
- Website: afd.gov.bd - ispr.gov.bd

Leadership
- Commander-in-Chief: President Mirza Fakhrul Islam Alamgir
- Minister of Defence: Prime Minister Tarique Rahman
- Principal Staff Officer: Lt. General Mir Mushfiqur Rahman

Personnel
- Military age: 18 years
- Conscription: No
- Active personnel: 204,000 (2025)
- Deployed personnel: 3,000 for United Nations peacekeeping

Expenditure
- Budget: ৳ 408.51 billion ($3.34 billion) (2025)
- Percent of GDP: 0.71%

Industry
- Domestic suppliers: List: Bangladesh Machine Tools Factory; Bangladesh Ordnance Factories; Bangladesh Aeronautical Centre; Khulna Shipyard Limited; Dockyard and Engineering Works; Chittagong Dry Dock Limited
- Foreign suppliers: Australia; China; Russia; Turkey; United Kingdom; United States; France; Italy; Japan; South Korea; India; Pakistan; Serbia; Germany
- Annual imports: US$18 million (2025)

Related articles
- History: Bangladesh War of Liberation; 1972-1975 Bangladesh insurgency; Chittagong Hill Tracts Insurgency; Gulf War; Operation Clean Heart; Operation Devil Hunt
- Ranks: Military ranks of Bangladesh

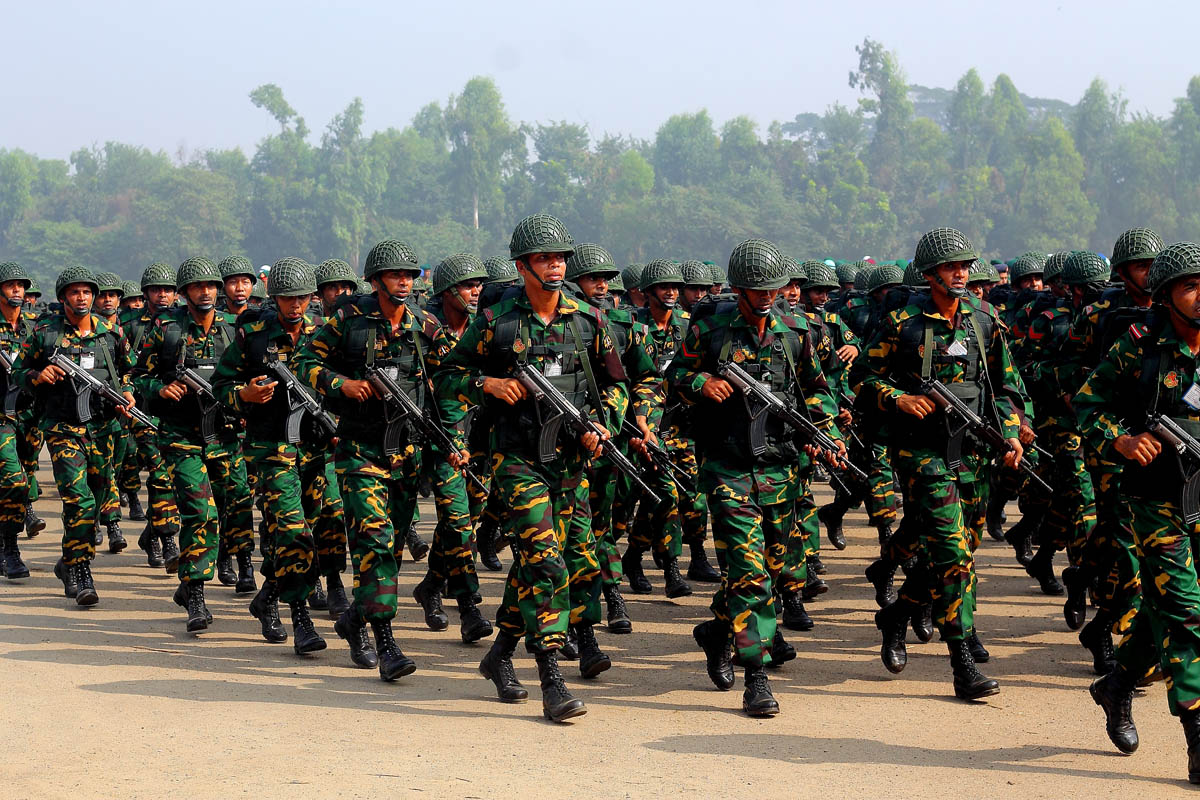
Bangladesh Army during Victory Day Parade 2011

The Bangladesh Armed Forces (Bengali: বাংলাদেশ সশস্ত্র বাহিনী, romanized: Bānlādeś Sôshôstrô Bāhinī) is the combined military force of Bangladesh, responsible for national defence, safeguarding sovereignty, and supporting civil authorities during emergencies. It consists of three uniformed branches: the Bangladesh Army, the Bangladesh Navy, and the Bangladesh Air Force.

The armed forces operate under the jurisdiction of the Ministry of Defence of the Government of Bangladesh and are directly administered by the Armed Forces Division of the Prime Minister's Office. The President of Bangladesh serves as the Commander-in-Chief of the Bangladesh Armed Forces.

Bangladesh has the third-largest defence budget in South Asia. The Bangladeshi military is also the 35th strongest in the world and the third most powerful military force in South Asia. The service branches of the Border Guard Bangladesh and Bangladesh Coast Guard are under the jurisdiction of the Ministry of Home Affairs during peacetime; however during wartime, they will fall under the command of the Bangladesh Army and the Bangladesh Navy, respectively.

Military policy is formulated and executed by the Armed Forces Division (AFD), whereas the Ministry of Defence (MoD) does not exercise any operational or policy authority over the Armed Forces. Since independence, the AFD and MoD have been led by the prime minister. To coordinate military policy with foreign and intelligence policy, both the president and the prime minister are advised by a six-member advisory board, which consists of the three military services chiefs of staff, principal staff officer of the Armed Forces Division, and military secretaries to the president and the prime minister. The directors-general of the NSI, the DGFI, and the BGB also serve in an advisory capacity when invited.

Armed Forces Day is observed on 21 November and commemorates the founding of the three services of the Armed Forces, who subsequently initiated a joint military operation against the occupying Pakistani Armed Forces during the Bangladesh Liberation War. Official functions are held across the country, including at Bangabhaban, the Armed Forces Division Headquarters at Dhaka Cantonment, all military cantonments, and at every military installation throughout Bangladesh.

Bangladesh Army Infantry

Bangladesh Armed Forces Special Forces from Army, Navy and Airforce Branch

== History ==
=== East Pakistan ===
With the partitioning of India on 15 August 1947, the territory constituting modern Bangladesh was partitioned from the province of Bengal as East Bengal, which joined Pakistan. Ethnic and sectional discrimination prevailed in various sectors of the state. Like other government sectors, Bengalis were under-represented in the Pakistani military too. Officers of Bengali origin in different wings of the armed forces made up just 5% of the entire military by 1965. West Pakistanis believed that Bengalis were not "martially inclined" unlike Pashtuns and Punjabis; the "Martial Races" notion was dismissed as ridiculous and humiliating by Bengalis. Moreover, despite huge defence spending, East Pakistan received none of the benefits, such as contracts, purchasing, and military support jobs. The Indo-Pakistani War of 1965 over Kashmir also highlighted the sense of military insecurity among Bengalis, as only an under-strength infantry division and 15 combat aircraft without tank support were in East Pakistan to repel any Indian attack during the conflict.

The East Bengal Regiment was formed on 15 February 1948 following Pakistan's independence and transition from post-British rule, composed exclusively of men from the western part of the country. The first East Bengal Regiment was composed of Bengali members of the British Indian Army Pioneer Corps and the Bihar Regiment of the abolished British Indian Army. Between 1948 and 1965, a total of eight battalions of EBR were raised.

=== Bangladesh War of Independence ===
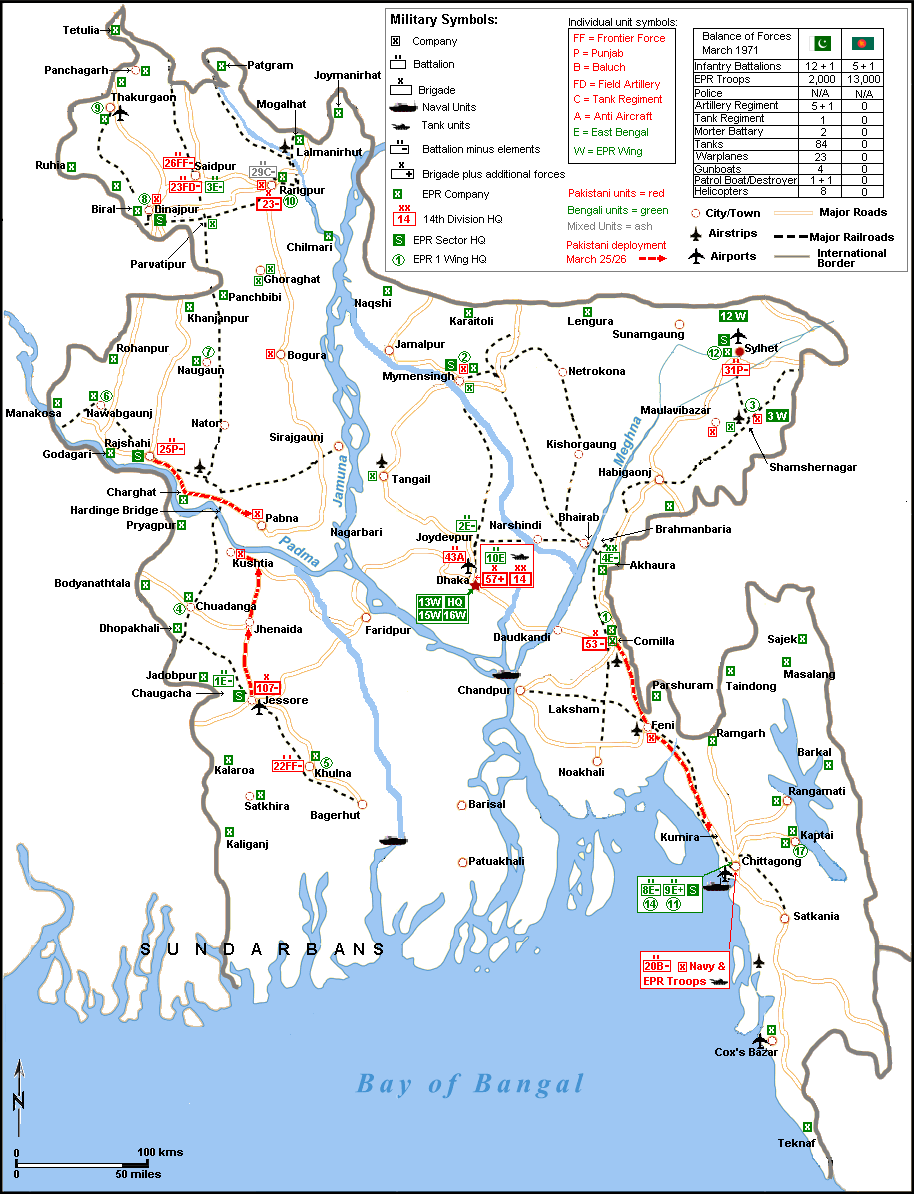
Location of Bengali and Pakistani military units in March 1971

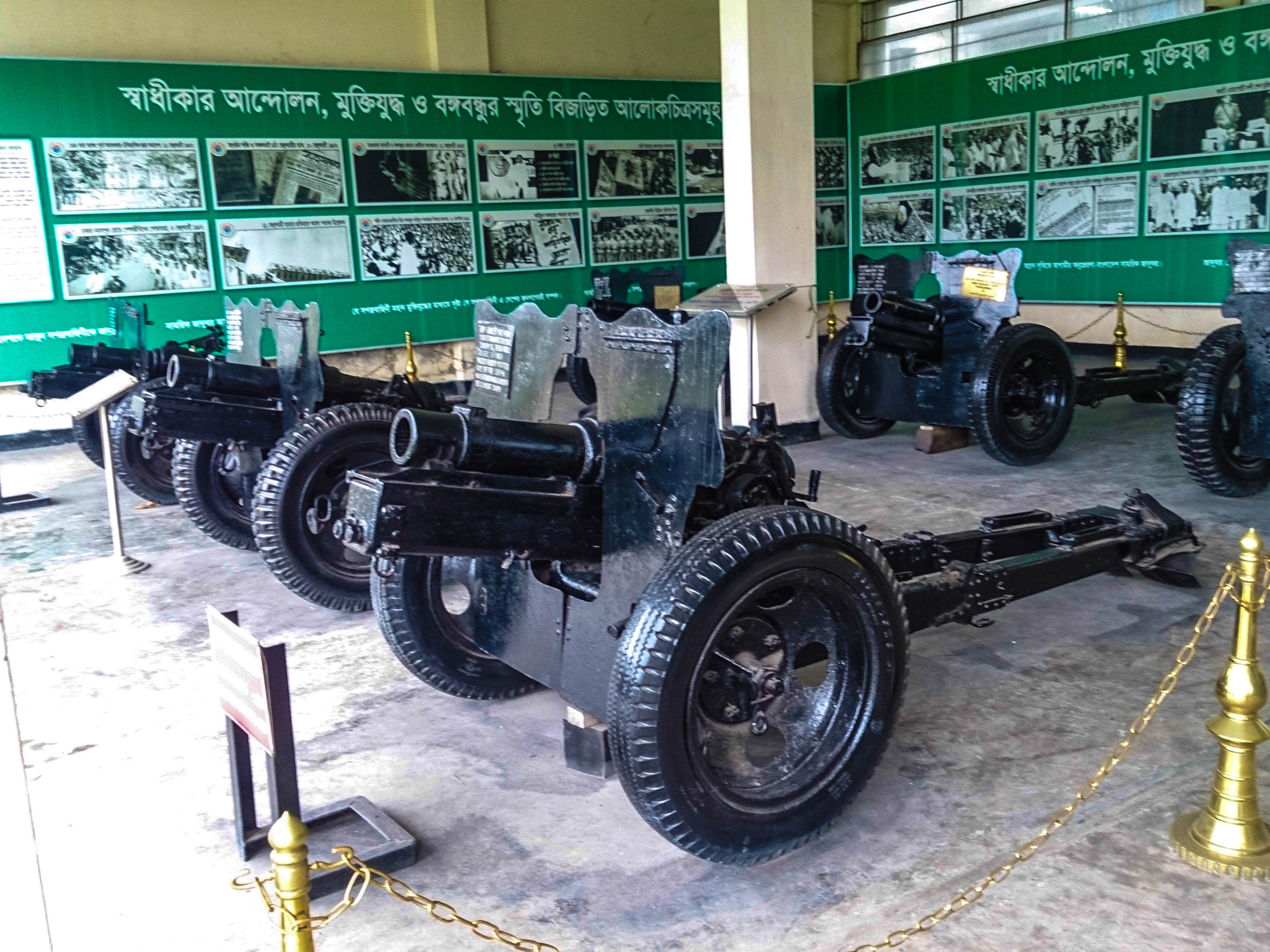
QF 3.7-inch mountain howitzers used by the Mukti Bahini

Following the victory of the Awami League in the 1970 elections, then-president General Yahya Khan refused to appoint its leader Sheikh Mujibur Rahman as the prime minister and launched a brutal attack named Operation Searchlight on the Bengali nationalists of the then East Pakistan, using the Pakistan Army to repress political movements. The number of people killed by Pakistani forces varies from a minimum of around 300,000 to a maximum of around 3 million. Responding to Mujib's call for rebellion, many students, workers, and other civilians mutinied against Pakistan and raised the Mukti Bahini, a guerrilla force. Later on, many Bengali officers and units from the Pakistan Army and East Pakistan Rifles mutinied against their West Pakistani counterparts and joined the Mukti Bahini. On 17 April 1971, M. A. G. Osmani took an oath as the commander-in-chief of Mukti Bahini. While the war raged on, the necessity of a well-trained armed force was always felt. During the first Bangladesh Sector Commanders Conference, held from 11 to 17 July 1971, the Bangladesh Forces started its journey composed of the revolting Bengali members of the Pakistan Army and EPR. In this historic conference, the field command structure, sector reorganisation, reinforcement, appointment of field commanders, and tactics of warfare were decided upon and carried out. On 21 November 1971, the Bangladesh Forces was divided into three separate services: the Bangladesh Army, Bangladesh Navy, and Bangladesh Air Force.

The Bangladesh Forces received modest assistance from the Indian Government soon after the start of the war. On 3 December 1971, the India-Pakistan war broke out, and Indian troops entered Bangladesh allied with the Bangladesh Armed Forces. On 16 December 1971, the Pakistani military surrendered to the joint Indian and Bangladeshi forces.

=== Post-independence ===
The newly formed Bangladeshi armed forces incorporated some of the units and guerrillas of the Mukti Bahini. Gen. Osmani, who had led the Mukti Bahini, was appointed the general of the Bangladesh armed forces. For many years, there was active discrimination in favour of the inductees from the Mukti Bahini against those Bengali officers who had continued service in the Pakistani armed forces or had been detained in West Pakistan. A group of angered officers assassinated the president, Sheikh Mujib, on 15 August 1975 and established a regime with politician Khondaker Mostaq Ahmed as president of Bangladesh and new army chief Maj. Gen. Ziaur Rahman. The military itself was the subject of divisions as Mujib's assassins were overthrown by the pro-Mujib Brig. Gen. Khaled Mosharraf on 3 November, who himself was soon overthrown by a socialist group of officers under Col. Abu Taher on 7 November who returned Ziaur Rahman to power—an event now called the Sipoy-Janata Biplob (Soldiers and People's Coup). Under the presidency of Ziaur Rahman, the military was reorganised to remove conflicts between rival factions and discontented cadre. However, Ziaur Rahman was himself overthrown in a 1981 coup attempt, and a year later, Lt. Gen. Hossain Mohammad Ershad took power from the elected government of President Abdus Sattar. The military remained the most important force in national politics under the regimes of Ziaur Rahman and later Hossain Mohammad Ershad until democracy was restored in 1991.

=== Modern period ===
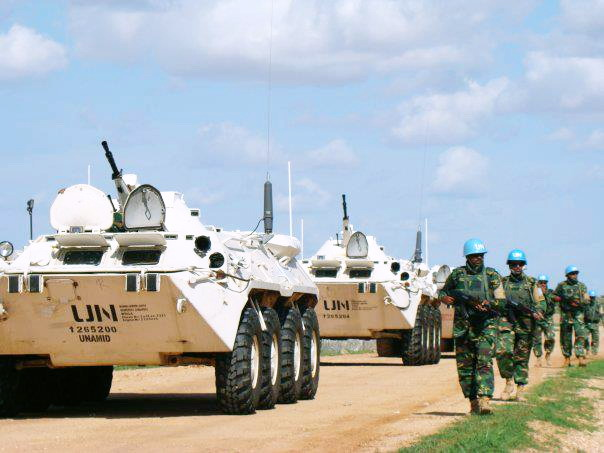
Bangladeshi peacekeepers in Darfur, Sudan

Bangladeshi Peacekeepers from Mali

Having relied primarily on India and the Soviet Union for military aid, Bangladesh has also developed military ties with the People's Republic of China and the United States. The Bangladesh Army has been actively involved in United Nations Peace Support Operations (UNPSO). During the first Gulf War in 1991, the Bangladesh Army sent a 2,193-member team to monitor peace in Saudi Arabia and Kuwait. The Bangladesh Army also participated in peacekeeping activities in Namibia, Cambodia, Somalia, Uganda, Rwanda, Mozambique, former Yugoslavia, Liberia, Haiti, Tajikistan, Western Sahara, Sierra Leone, Kosovo, Georgia, East Timor, Congo, Côte d'Ivoire, and Ethiopia. As of October 2008, Bangladesh remained the second largest contributor with 9,800 troops in the UN Peacekeeping forces.

Until a peace accord was signed in 1997, the Bangladeshi military engaged in counterinsurgency operations in the Chittagong Hill Tracts, fighting the Shanti Bahini separatist group. In 2001, Bangladeshi military units engaged in clashes with the Indian Border Security Force (BSF) along the northern border.

Several projects and schemes aiming to expand and modernize the Bangladeshi armed forces were launched by the government of former Prime Minister Begum Khaleda Zia.

Forces Goal 2030 was launched by the government of Prime Minister Sheikh Hasina to secure new equipment for the Bangladeshi military.

=== Bangladesh-Myanmar border ===
Standoffs have occasionally occurred at the Bangladesh-Myanmar border, including in 1991 and 2008. Most of the standoffs took place when Myanmar attempted to force Rohingyas into Bangladesh. In 2008, the two countries deployed warships after Myanmar attempted to explore a disputed Bay of Bengal seabed for oil and gas. The dispute was resolved at an international tribunal in 2012. Bangladesh and Myanmar have also conducted counter-insurgency operations on the border.

- 2008 Bangladesh–Myanmar naval standoff
- 2015 Bangladesh-Arakan Army border clash

== Medals and decorations ==
The following are the various gallantry, service, and war medals of the Bangladesh Armed Forces.

=== Gallantry awards ===
- Bir Sreshtho-(Bengali: বীরশ্রেষ্ঠ; literally, "The Most Valiant Hero"), the highest gallantry award
- Bir Uttom- (Bengali: বীর উত্তম; literally, "Better among Braves"), the second highest gallantry award
- Bir Bikrom- (Bengali: বীর বিক্রম; literally, "Valiant hero"), the third highest gallantry award
- Bir Protik- (Bengali: বীর প্রতীক; literally, "Symbol of Bravery or Idol of Courage"), the fourth highest gallantry award

=== Service medals ===
- Order of Military Merit
- Jestha Padak I (10 years service)
- Jestha Padak II (20 years service)
- Jestha Padak III (30 years service)

== Current deployments ==
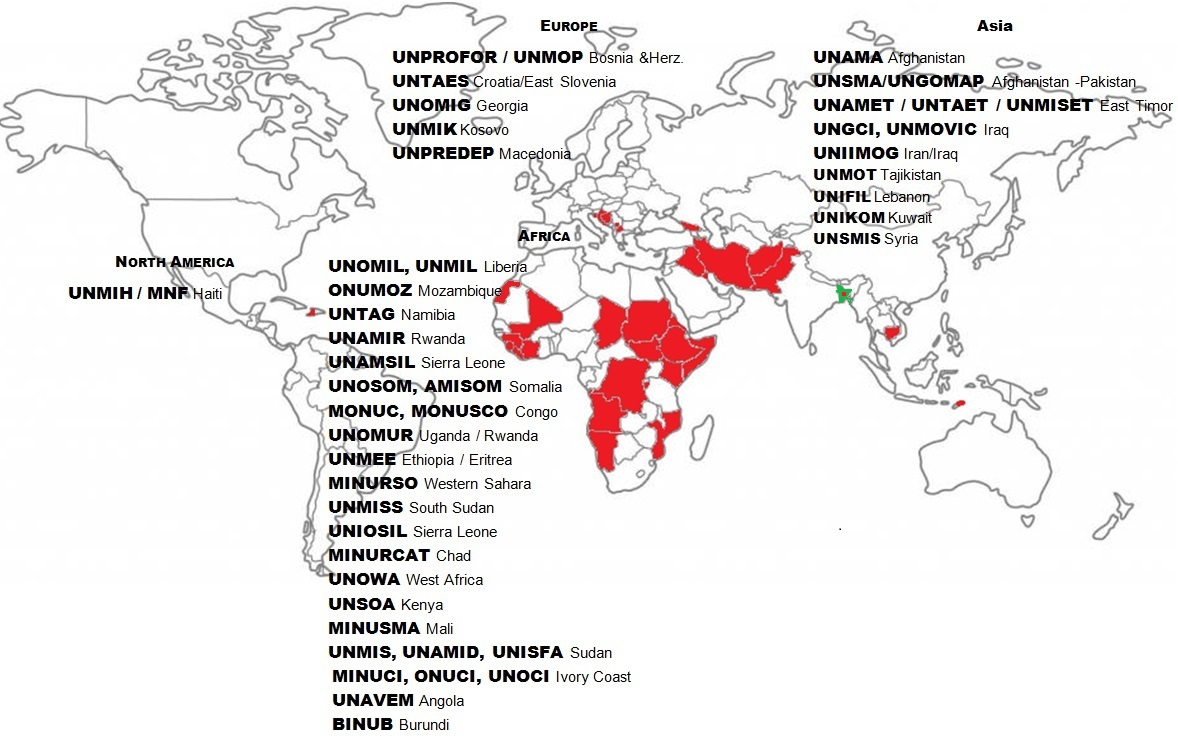
Map of Bangladeshi military UN peacekeeping forces

Bangladesh has consistently made large contributions to United Nations peacekeeping operations. As of May 2007, Bangladesh had major deployments in the Democratic Republic of Congo, Liberia, Lebanon, Sudan, Timor-Leste, and Côte d'Ivoire. With 10,736 troops deployed, it ranks first in personnel contributions to UN peacekeeping. The government declined to participate in Iraq on a request from the United States. The deployment to Liberia began in October 2003 and has remained at a level of about 3,200 who are participating in peacekeeping, charitable activities, and infrastructure development.

== Training ==
Officers are trained and educated for three years at the Bangladesh Military Academy, Bhatiary, Bangladesh Naval Academy at Patenga, both located in Chittagong, and Bangladesh Air Force Academy located in Jessore. For advanced training during their careers, officers are sent to Bangladesh Defence Services Command and Staff College at Mirpur, while senior officers attend the National Defence University for Armed Forces War Course. Many attend the Military Institute of Science and Technology while serving. Officers of the Army Medical Corps are recruited after graduation from both military and civil medical colleges. They undergo basic military training at Bangladesh Military Academy, followed by professional training at the medical corps centre and Armed Forces Medical Institute. Recently, cadets of the Armed Forces Medical College also started joining the services directly.

== Ranks ==
Bangladeshi military ranks essentially correspond to those used by the armed forces of the Commonwealth nations.

The rank insignia for commissioned officers for the armed forces respectively.

Rank group	General / flag officers				Senior officers			Junior officers
Bangladesh Army
Bangladesh Army	জেনারেল; Jēnārēl	লেফটেন্যান্ট জেনারেল; Lēphṭēnānṭ jēnārēl	মেজর জেনারেল; Mējar jēnārēl	ব্রিগেডিয়ার জেনারেল; Brigēḍiẏār jēnārēl	কর্নেল; Karnēl	লেফটেন্যান্ট কর্নেল; Lēphṭēnānṭ karnēl	মেজর; Mējar	ক্যাপ্টেন; Kaepṭēn	লেফটেন্যান্ট; Lēphṭēnānṭ		সেকেন্ড লেফটেন্যান্ট; Sēkēnḍ lēphṭēnānṭ
Bangladesh Navy
Bangladesh Navy	এ্যাডমিরাল; Aeḍmirāl	ভাইস এ্যাডমিরাল; Bhā'is aeḍamirāl	রিয়ার এ্যাডমিরাল; Riẏār aeḍamirāl	কমোডোর; Kômōḍōr	ক্যাপ্টেন; Kaepṭēn	কমান্ডার; Kômānḍār	লেফটেন্যান্ট কমান্ডার; Lēphṭēnānṭ kômānḍār	লেফটেন্যান্ট; Lēphṭēnānṭ	সাব-লেফটেন্যান্ট; Sāb-lēphṭēnānṭ	এ্যাক্টিং সাব-লেফটেন্যান্ট; Ēyākṭiṁ sāb-lēphṭēn'yānṭ	মিডশিপম্যান; Miḍśipmaen
Bangladesh Air Force
Bangladesh Air Force	এয়ার চিফ মার্শাল; Ēẏār chiph mārśāl	এয়ার মার্শাল; Ēẏār mārśāl	এয়ার ভাইস মার্শাল; Ēẏār bhā'is mārśāl	এয়ার কমোডোর; Ēẏār kômōḍōr	গ্রুপ ক্যাপ্টেন; Grup kaepṭēn	উইং কমান্ডার; U'iṁ kômānḍār	স্কোয়াড্রন লীডার; Skōẏāḍran līḍār	ফ্লাইট লেফটেন্যান্ট; Phlā'iṭ lēphṭēnānṭ	ফ্লাইং অফিসার; Phlā'iṁ ôphisār		পাইলট অফিসার; Pā'ilôṭ Ôphisār
Rank group	General / flag officers				Senior officers			Junior officers

== Organisation ==
Name	Mission	Headquarters
Warfare
Bangladesh Army	Ground warfare	Dhaka Cantonment
Bangladesh Navy	Naval warfare	Dhaka Cantonment
Bangladesh Air Force	Aerial warfare	Dhaka Cantonment
Paramilitary
Border Guard Bangladesh	Maintaining the security of the land border.	Pilkhana
Bangladesh Coast Guard	Maintaining the security of the naval border.	Agargaon
Civil and Reserve
Bangladesh Police	Enforcing and upholding laws nationwide.	Fulbari, Dhaka
Bangladesh Ansar and Village Defence Party	Preservation of internal security as auxiliary force.	Khilgaon
Bangladesh National Cadet Corps	Volunteer reserve and second line of defence for the Army, Navy, and Air Force.	Sector-6, Uttara
Specialized
President Guard Regiment	Cavalry regiment for the security of the President.	Bangabhaban
Special Security Force	Provide physical security to anyone designated as VVIP by the government.	PMO
Special Operational Combatants
Para-Commando Brigade	Counter-terrorism, hostage rescue, deep-penetration raids, and warfare both domestically and internationally.	Jalalabad Cantonment
Special Warfare Diving And Salvage	Anti-piracy and underwater demolition.	BNS Nirvik, Chittagong
41 Squadron Airborne	Functions under the directive of PCB and the Air force.	
Special Response Battalion	Counter-terrorism and crackdowns on illegal substances.	Kurmitola
Armed Police Battalion	Form to create a reserve battalion of Bangladesh Police to assist Bangladesh Army in any operation and protecting "KPI" infrastructures.	Uttara
SWAT (Bangladesh)	The Special Weapons And Tactics (Bengali: বিশেষ অস্ত্র ও কৌশল; SWAT) is a tier two police tactical unit of the Dhaka Metropolitan Police (DMP) of the Bangladesh Police. They operate under the Special Action Group of the Counter Terrorism and Transnational Crime (CTTC).The SWAT was formed to recover illegal arms and arrest hardcore terrorists and has a vital role in neutralizing any and all threats..	Dhaka

=== Military districts ===
- Savar Area Command
- Ghatail Area Command, Tangail
- Bogra Area Command
- Rangpur Area Command
- Comilla Area Command
- Chittagong Area Command
- Ramu Area Command
- Jessore Area Command
- Sylhet Area Command
- Barisal Area Command
- Army Training and Doctrine Command
- Army Logistics Area

Dhaka Cantonment

- HQ All Military Lands
- HQ Cantonment Boards
- HQ of Bangladesh Army
- Armed Forces Division (AFD)
- 46 Independent Infantry Brigade
- 24 Independent Engineers Brigade
- 18 Engineers Brigade
- 6 Air Defence Brigade
- 14 Army Signal Brigade
- HQ, President's Guard Regiment
- Inter Services Selection Board (ISSB)
- HQ's Armed Forces Medical and Nursing Corps (AFMNC)
- Central Officer's Record Office (CORO)
- HQ's Armed Forces Recruiting Centre (AFRC)
- HQ's Cantonment Public Schools
- HQ's Armed Forces Library
- Armed Forces Institute of Pathology (AFIP)
- National Armed Forces Cemetery

=== Educational and training institutes ===
- Army Institute of Business Administration (Army IBA), Savar Cantonment, Dhaka
- Bangladesh University of Professionals (BUP), Mirpur Cantonment, Dhaka
- Bangladesh Military Academy (BMA), Bhatiari, Chittagong
- Bangladesh Army International University of Science & Technology (BAIUST), Cumilla Cantonment.
- School of Infantry and Tactics (SI&T), Jalalabad Cantonment, Sylhet.
- Defence Services Command and Staff College (DSC&SC), Mirpur Cantonment, Dhaka.
- National Defence College (NDC), Mirpur Cantonment, Dhaka.
- Military Institute of Science and Technology (MIST), Mirpur Cantonment, Dhaka.
- Armoured Corps Centre & School (ACC&S), Majira Cantonment, Bogra.
- Engineer Centre and School of Military Engineering, Qadirabad Cantonment, Natore.
- Signal Training Centre and School, Jessore Cantonment, Jessore.
- Army Service Corp Centre & School, Jahanabad Cantonment, Khulna.
- Army Medical Corps Centre & School, Shaheed Salahuddin Cantonment, Ghatail, Tangail.
- Ordnance Corps Centre & School, Rajendrapur Cantonment, Gazipur
- Bangladesh Institute of Peace Support Operation Training (BIPSOT), Rajendrapur Cantonment, Gazipur.
- Electrical and Mechanical Engineering Centre and School, Saidpur Cantonment, Nilphamari.
- Corps of Military Police Centre and School, Savar Cantonment, Savar, Dhaka.
- Army School of Education and Administration, Shahid Salahuddin Cantonment, Ghatail, Tangail.
- Army School of Physical Training and Sports (ASPTS), Dhaka Cantonment, Dhaka.
- Army School of Music, Chittagong Cantonment, Chittagong.
- Armed Forces Medical College (AFMC), Dhaka Cantonment, Dhaka.
- Army Medical College Chattogram (AMCC)
- Army Medical College Comilla (AMCCo)
- Army Medical College Bogra (AMCB)
- Army Medical College Jashore (AMCJ)
- Rangpur Army Medical College (RAMC)
- Artillery Centre and School, Halishahar, Chittagong.
- School of Military Intelligence, Moynamoti Cantonment, Comilla.
- East Bengal Regimental Centre, Chittagong Cantonment, Chittagong.
- Bangladesh Infantry Regimental Centre, Rajshahi Cantonment, Rajshahi.
- Non Commissioned Officers Academy, Majira Cantonment, Bogra.

=== Training institutes of Bangladesh Air Force ===
- Aviation and Aerospace University, Bangladesh
- Bangladesh Air Force Academy (BAFA), Jessore.
- Flying Instructors School (FIS), Bogra.
- Command and Staff Training Institute (CSTI), Dhaka.
- Flight Safety Institute (FSI), Dhaka.
- Officers' Training School (OTS), Jessore.
- Aero-Medical Institute (AMI), Dhaka.
- Fighter Controller Training Unit (FCTU), Dhaka.
- School of Physical Fitness (SOPF), Dhaka.
- Recruits Training School (RTS), Shamshernagar, Moulvibazar.
- Training Wing (TW), Chittagong.
- Mechanical Transport Driving School (MTDS), Shamshernagar.
- Helicopter Simulator Institute BAF (HSI), Dhaka

=== Training Institutes of Bangladesh Navy ===
- Bangladesh Naval Academy (BNA), Chittagong.
- BNS Shaheed Moazzem, Kaptai, Rangamati Hill District, Chittagong. (For Sailor's Advanced Training)
- BNS Isa Khan, Chittagong (Home of 13 Different Training Schools)
- BNS Titumir, Khulna (Home of New Entry Training School (NETS) and School of Logistics and Management (SOLAM))
- School of Maritime Warfare & Tactics, Chittagong Port.

=== Army Cantonments ===
Cantonments are where Bangladesh Army personnel work, train, and live.

- Alikadam Cantonment (Bandarban)
- Bandarban Cantonment (Bandarban)
- Bangladesh Military Academy (Chittagong)
- Bogra Cantonment (Bogra)
- Chittagong Cantonment (Chittagong)
- Comilla Cantonment (Comilla)
- Dhaka Cantonment (Dhaka)
- Dighinala Cantonment (Khagrachhari)
- Halishahar Cantonment (Chittagong)
- Jahanabad Cantonment (Khulna)
- Jahangirabad Cantonment (Bogra)
- Jalalabad Cantonment (Sylhet)
- Jamuna Cantonment (Bhuapur, Tangail)
- Jessore Cantonment (Jessore)
- Kaptai Cantonment (Kaptai)
- Khagrachhari Cantonment (Khagrachhari)
- Kholahati Cantonment (Parbatipur, Dinajpur)
- Mirpur Cantonment (Mirpur)
- Mithamain Cantonment (Kishoreganj)
- Mymensingh Cantonment (Mymensingh)
- Padma Cantonment (Munshiganj and Shariatpur)
- Postogola Cantonment (Dhaka)
- Qadirabad Cantonment (Natore)
- Rajendrapur Cantonment (Gazipur)
- Rajshahi Cantonment (Rajshahi)
- Ramu Cantonment (Ramu, Cox's Bazar)
- Rangamati Cantonment (Rangamati)
- Rangpur Cantonment (Rangpur)
- Saidpur Cantonment (Saidpur, Nilphamari)
- Savar Cantonment (Savar)
- Shahid Salahuddin Cantonment (Ghatail, Tangail)
- Barisal Cantonment (Patuakhali)

=== Air Force bases ===
- BAF Base A.K. Khandokar (Kurmitola, Dhaka)
- BAF Base Cox's Bazar (Cox's Bazar, Chittagong)
- BAF Base Khademul Bashar (Tejgaon, Dhaka)
- BAF Base Matiur Rahman (Jessore)
- BAF Base Paharkanchanpur (Tangail)
- BAF Base Zahurul Haq (Chittagong)

=== Navy bases ===
- BNS Haji Mohshin (Dhaka)
- BNS Dhaka (Dhaka)
- BNS Issa Khan (Chittagong)
- BNS Shaheed Moazzem (Rangamati)
- BNS Pekua (Cox's Bazar)
- BNS Sher-e-Bangla (Patuakhali)
- BNS Titumir (Khulna)
- BNS Ulka (Chittagong)
- BNS Bhatiary (Chittagong)
- BNS Nirvik (Chittagong)
- BNS Mongla (Bagerhat)
- BNS Patenga
- BNS Upasham (Khulna)

== Future modernisation plans ==
Bangladesh has made a long-term modernisation plan for its armed forces named Forces Goal 2030. The plan includes the modernisation and expansion of all equipment and infrastructures and providing enhanced training.

== Gallery ==
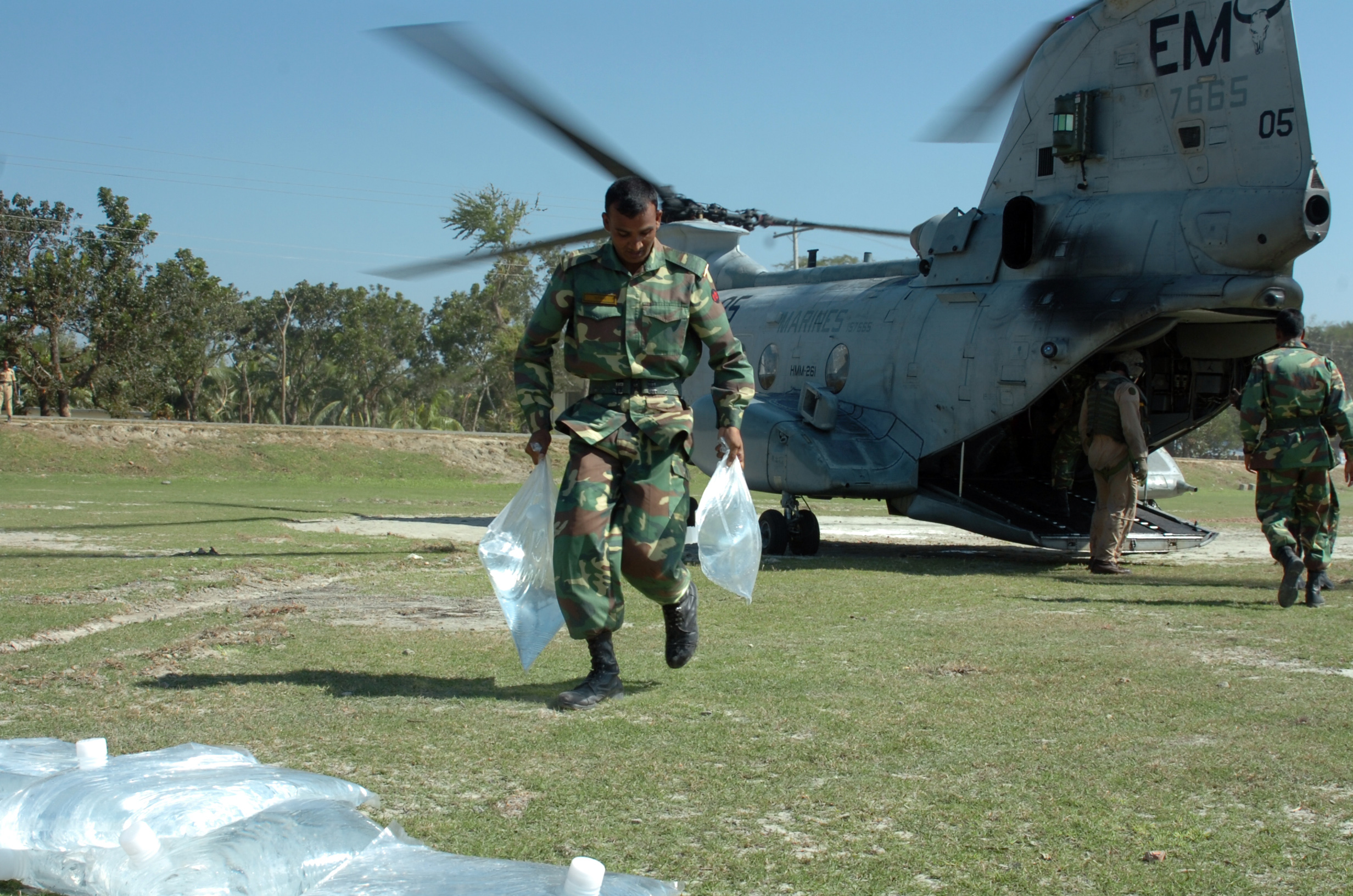
Humanitarian operation after Cyclone Sidr

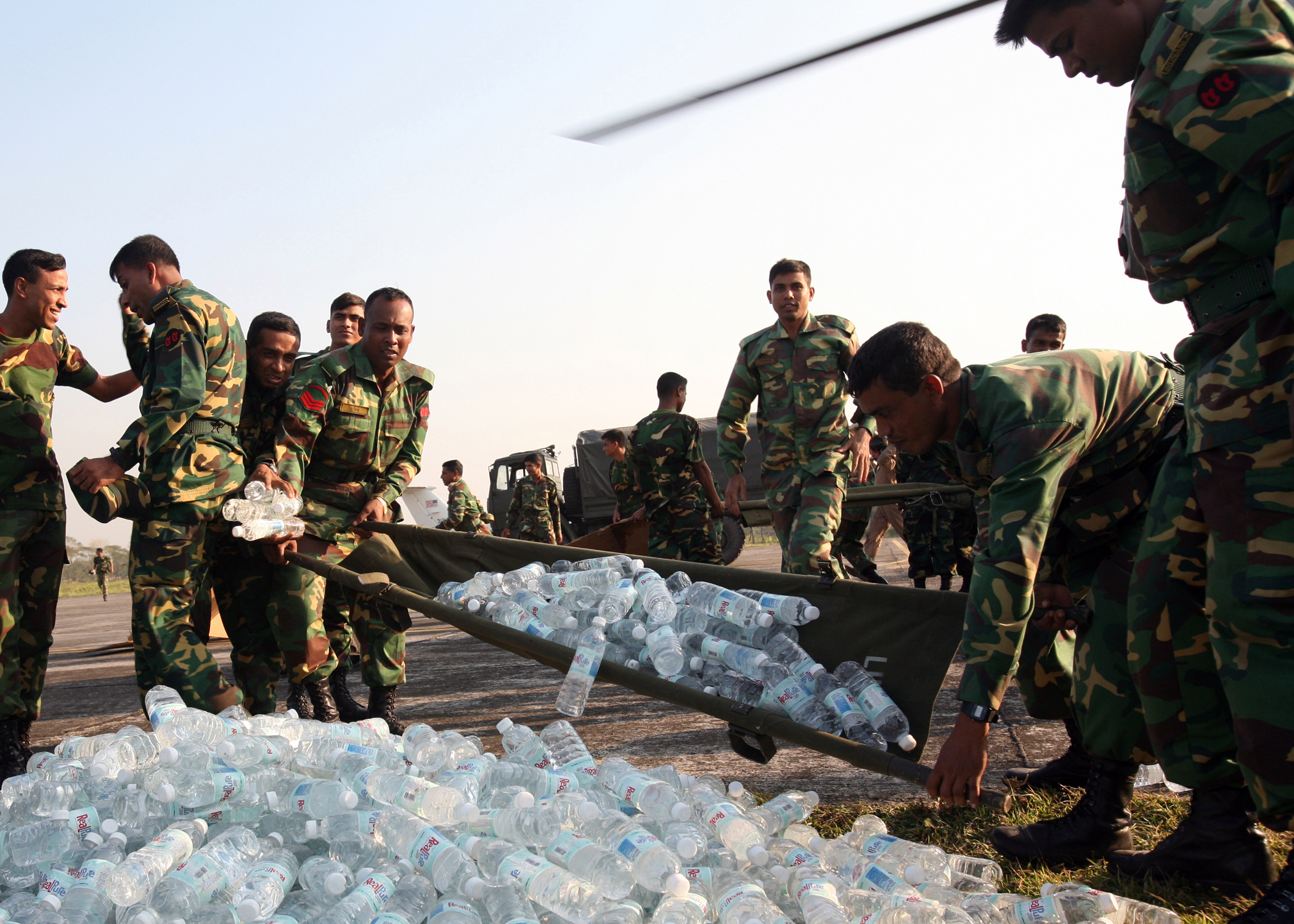
Soldiers unload water for cyclone victims.

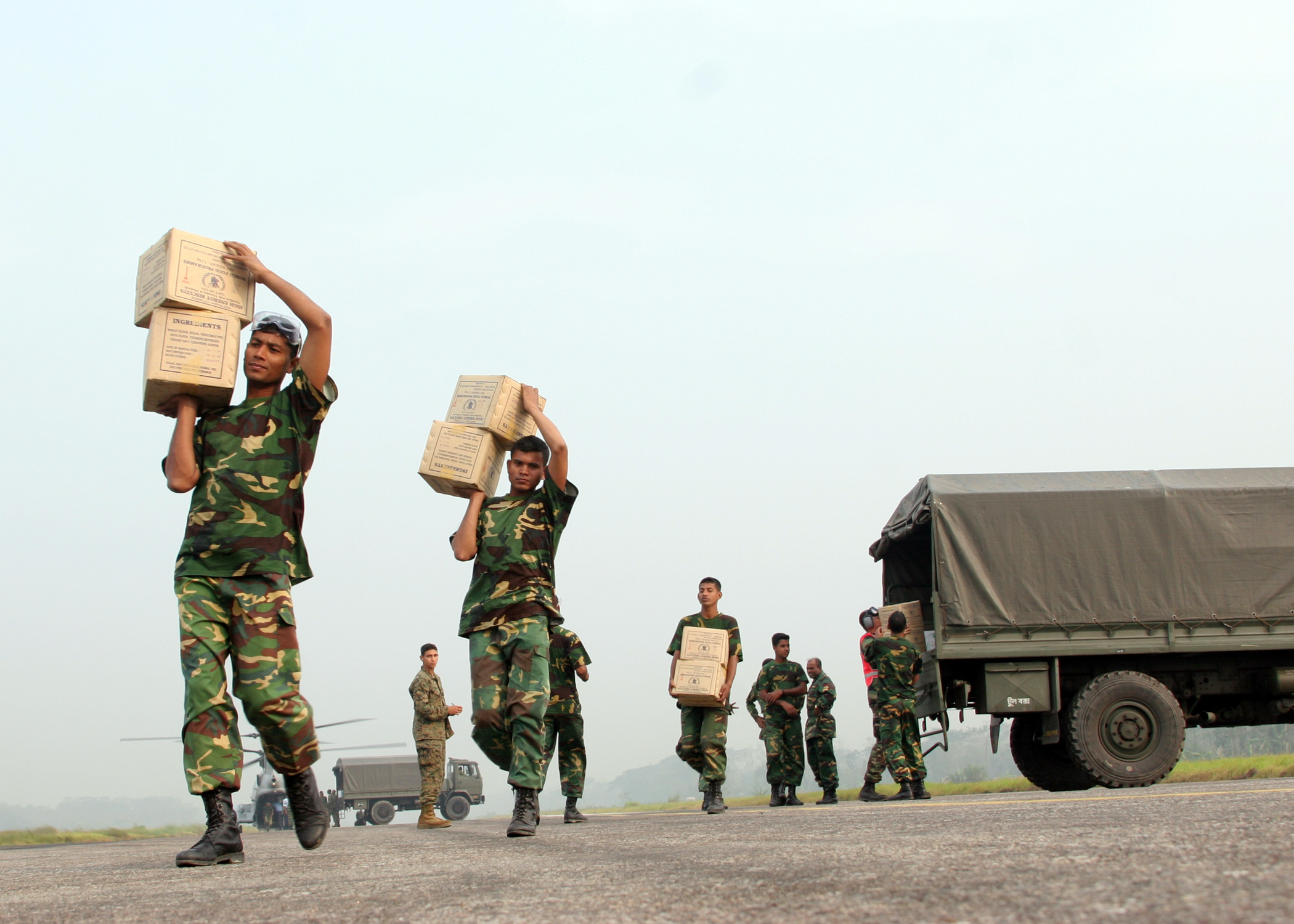
Soldiers unload food for cyclone victims

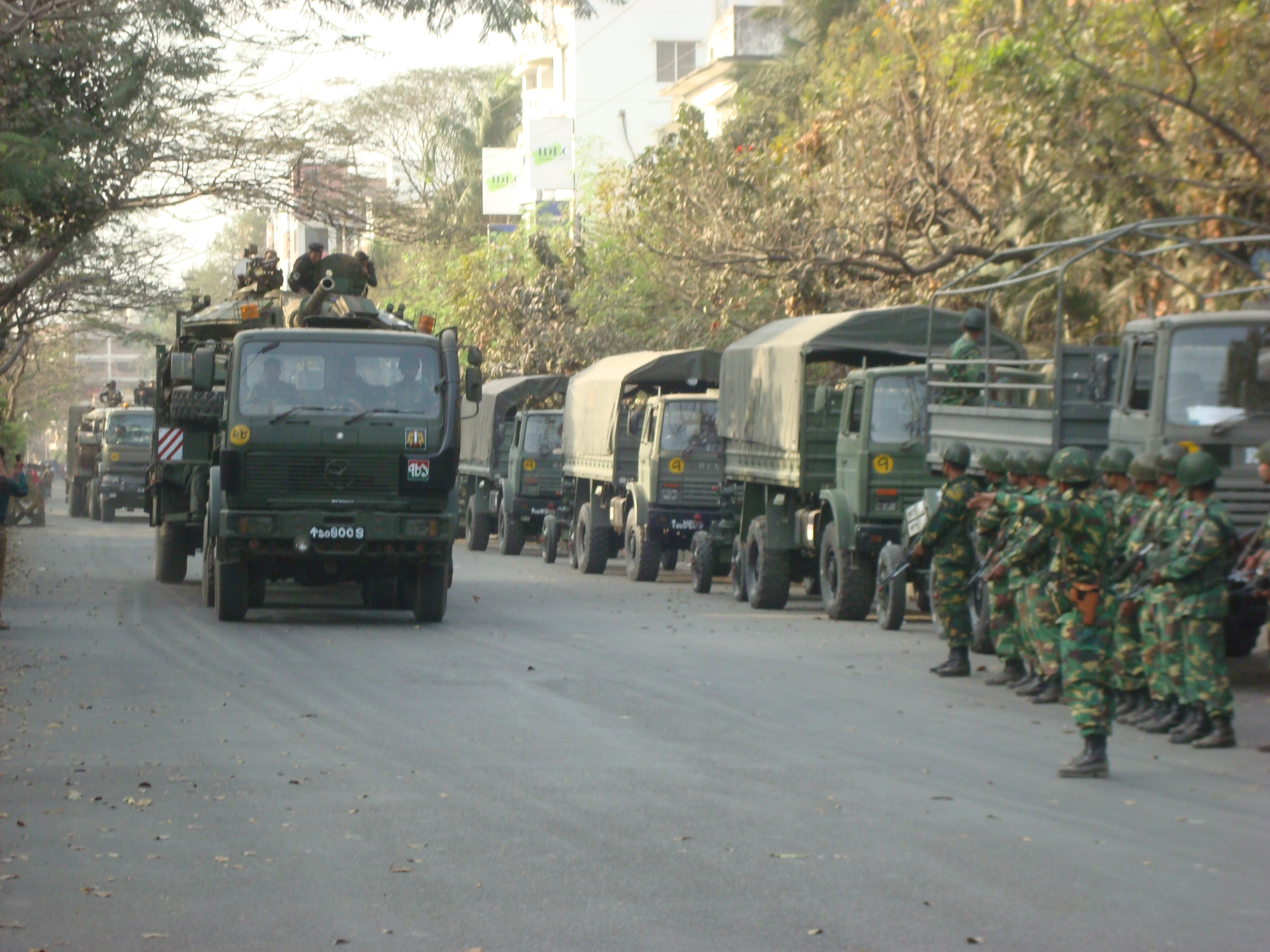
Soldiers on active duty in Dhaka

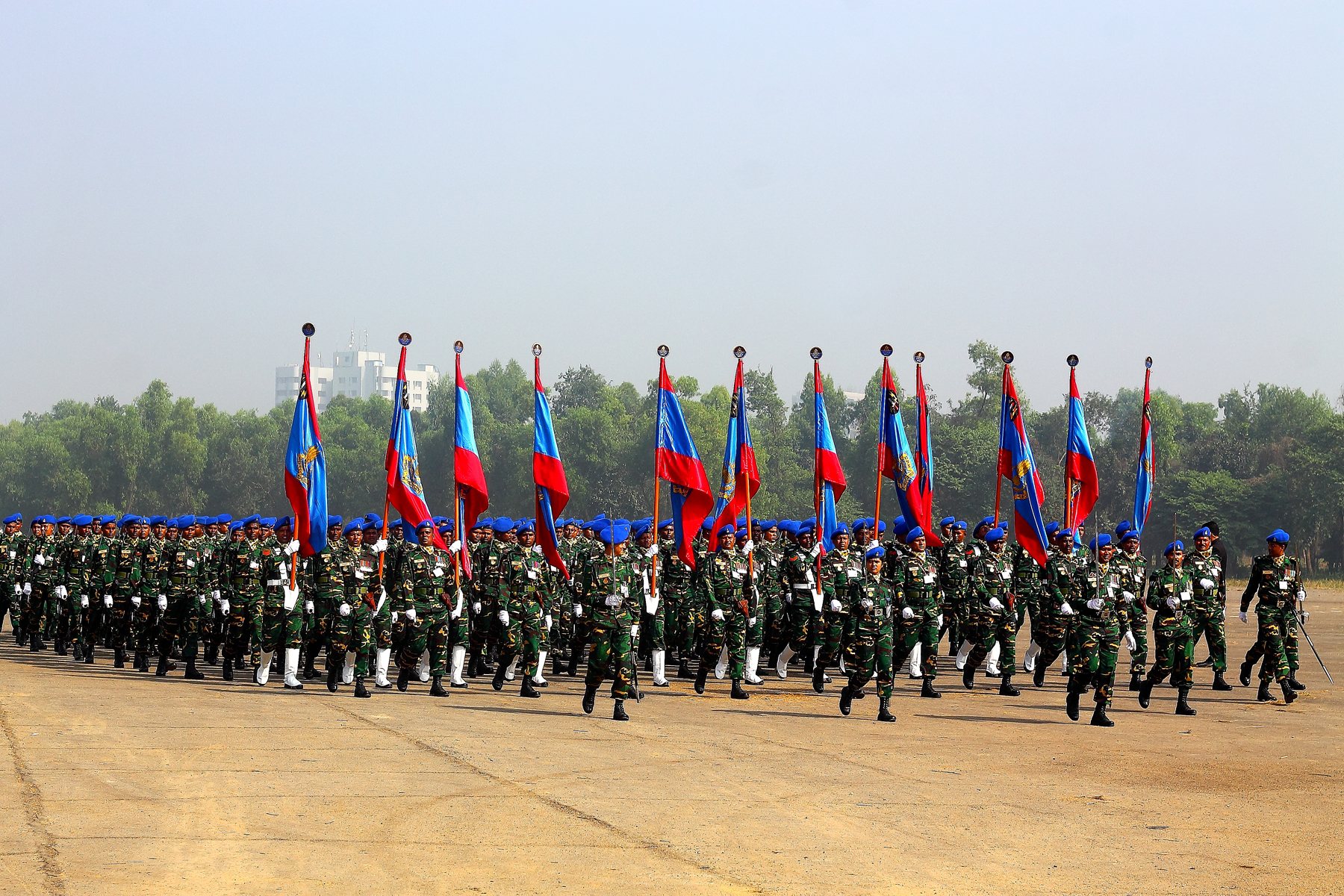
Soldiers at Victory Day Parade 2012

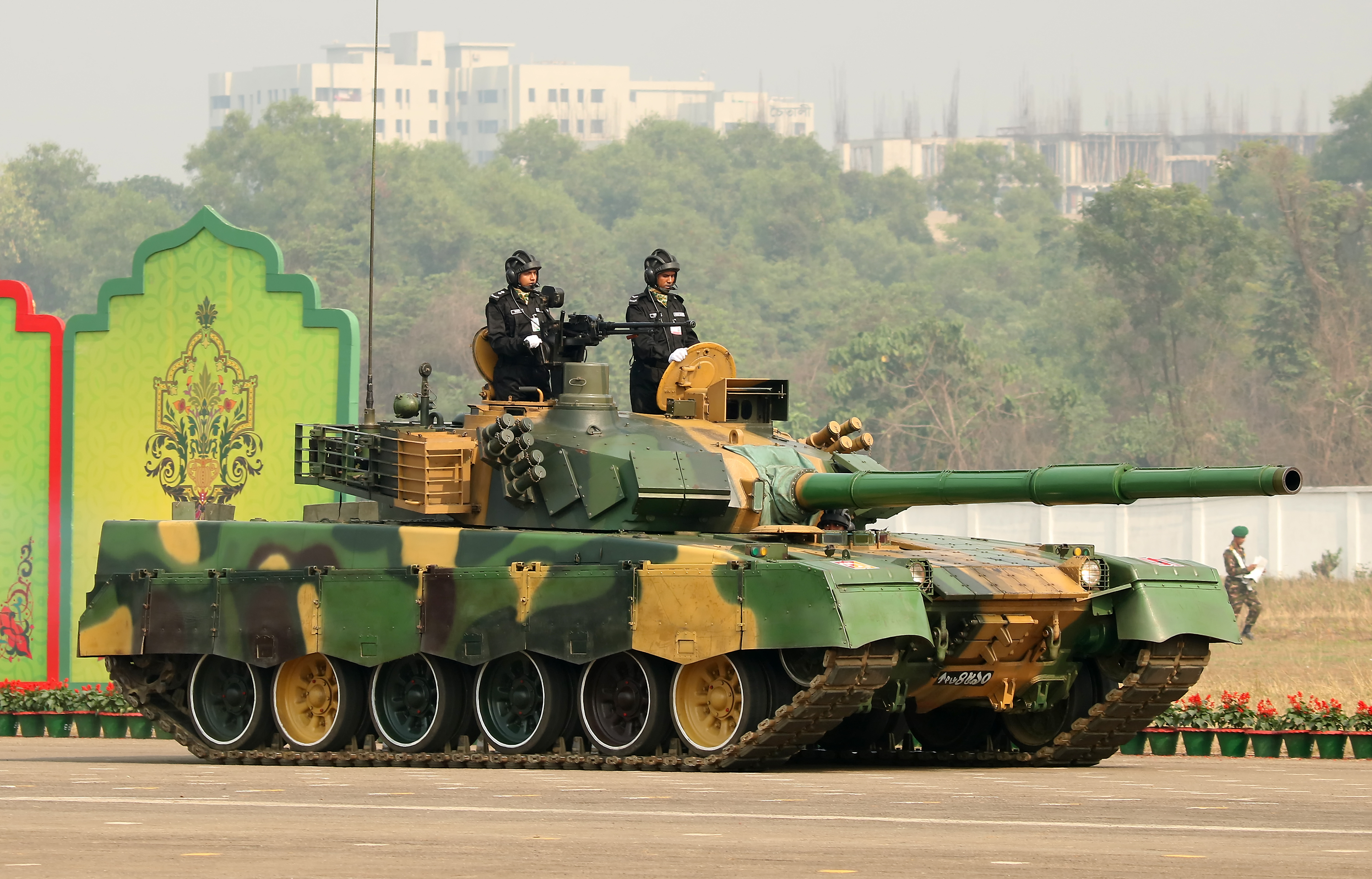
Army's MBT-2000/VT-1A main battle tank at parade in 2017

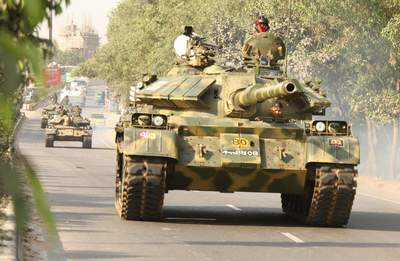
Army's Type-69 IIG main battle tank

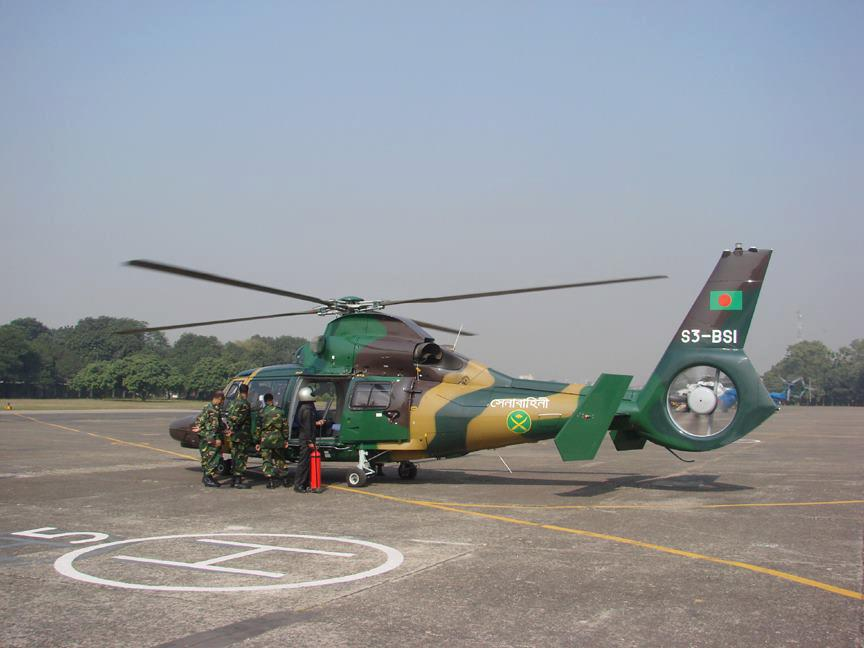
AS365 Dauphin helicopter of Army

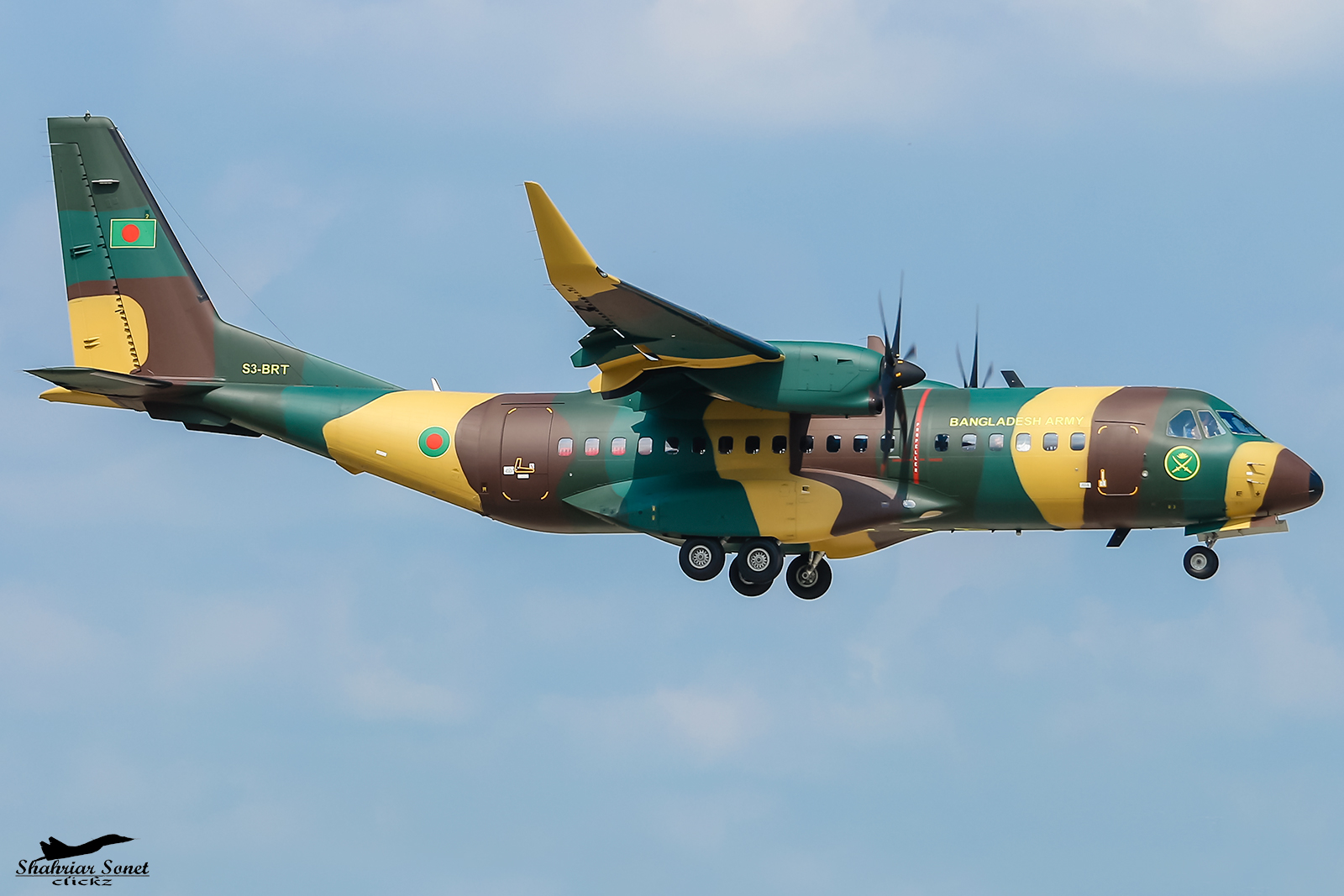
C-295 transport aircraft of Army

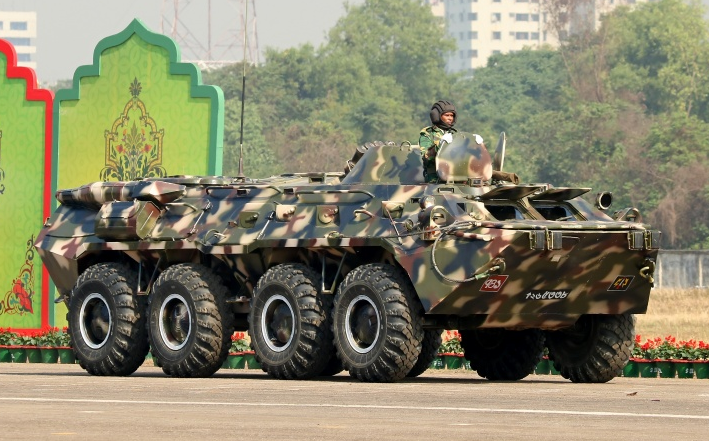
BTR-80 armoured personnel carrier

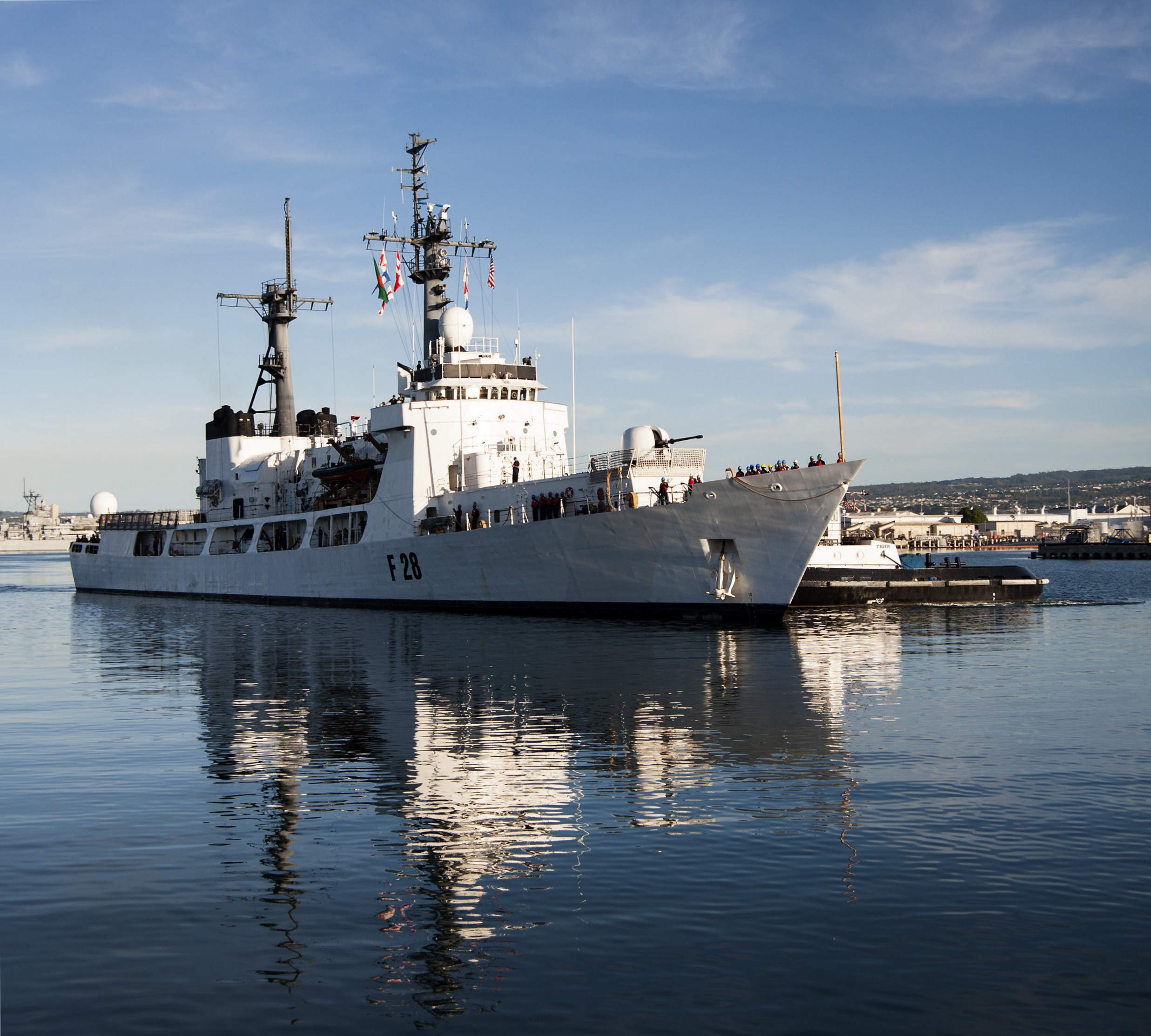
Frigate BNS Somudra Joy (F-28) in 2013

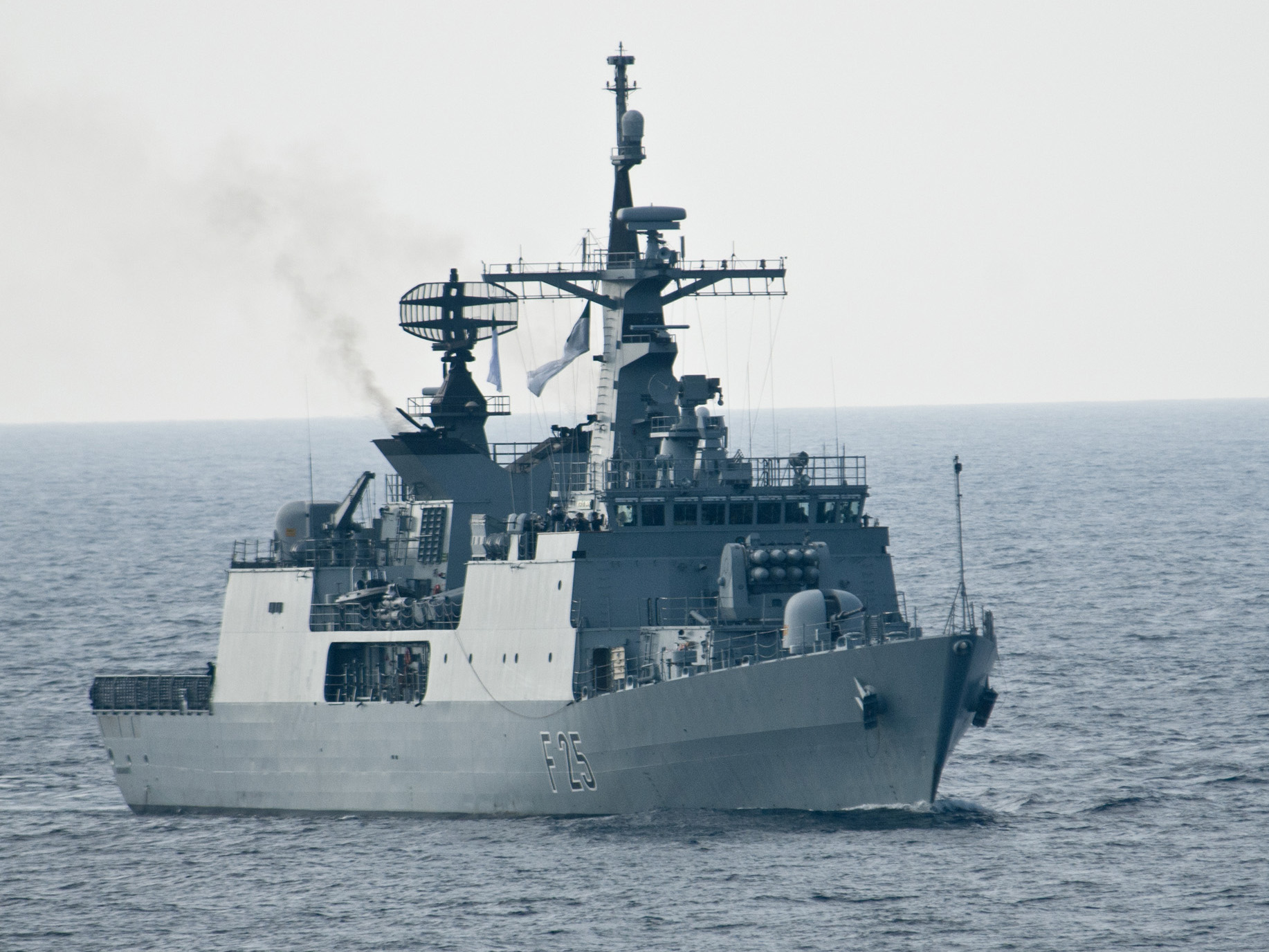
BNS Khalid Bin Walid (F-25) guided missile frigate

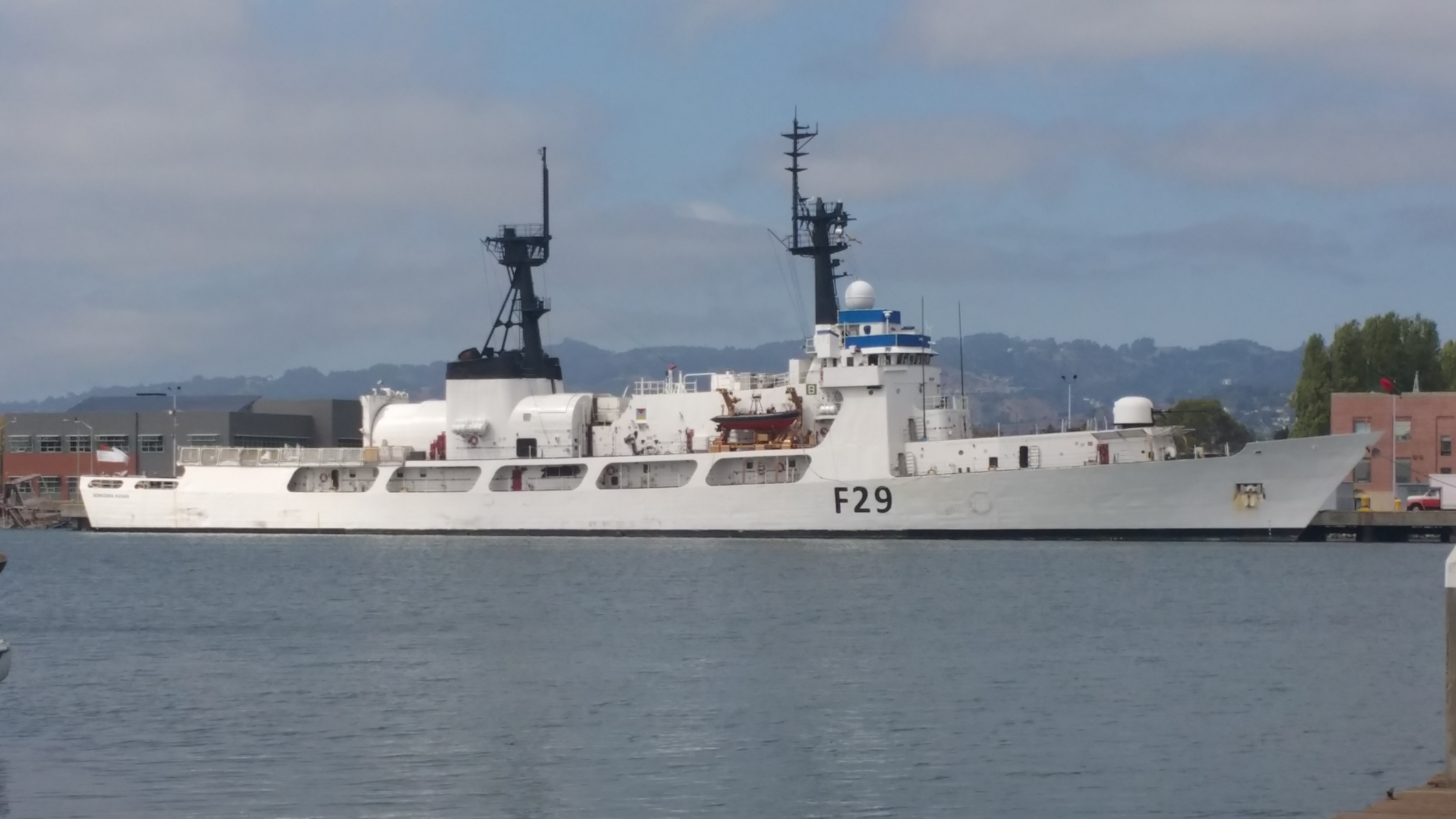
Frigate BNS Somudra Avijan (F-29) in 2015

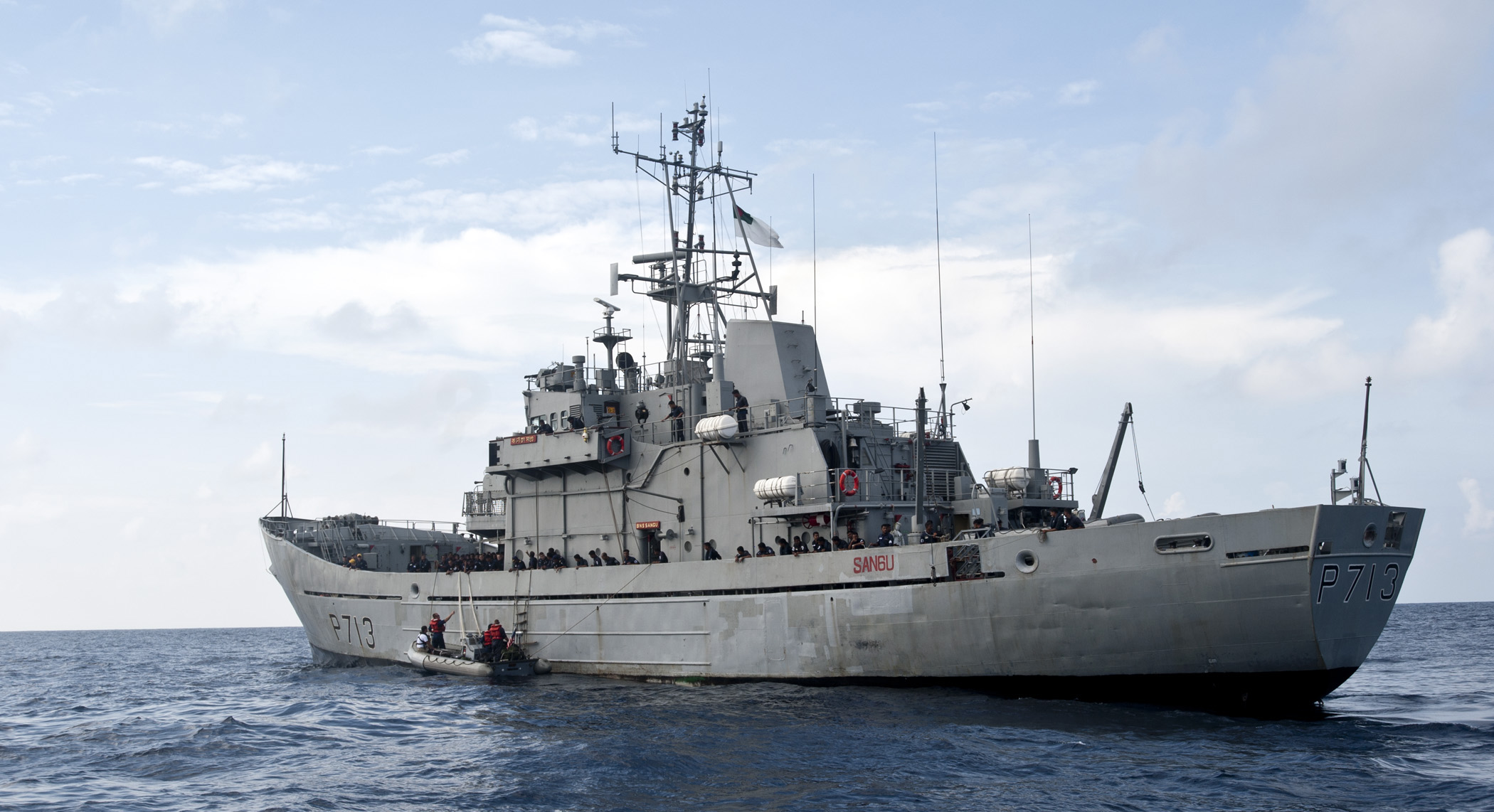
Patrol ship BNS Sangu

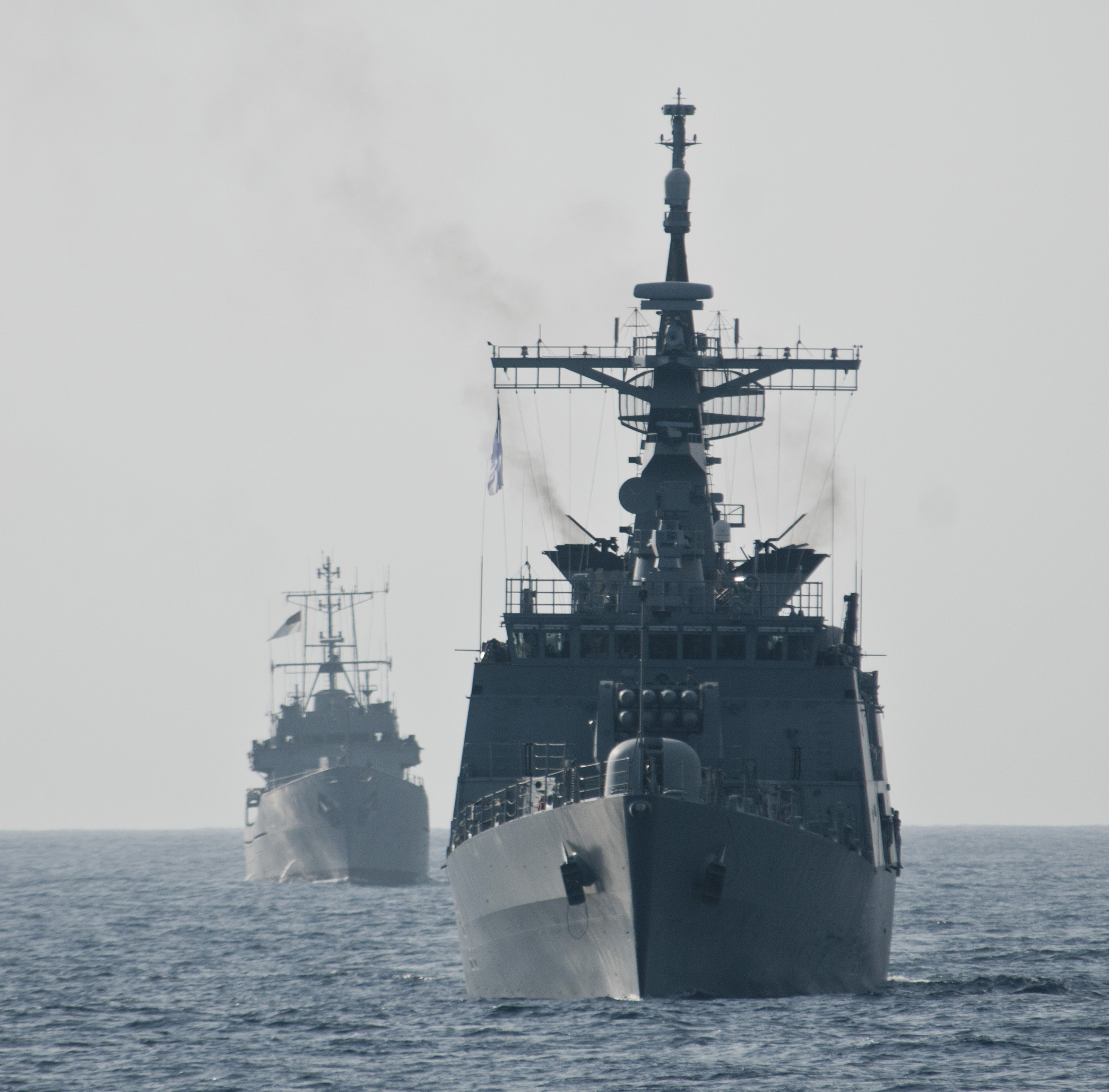
Frigate and OPV at Exercise CARAT 2012

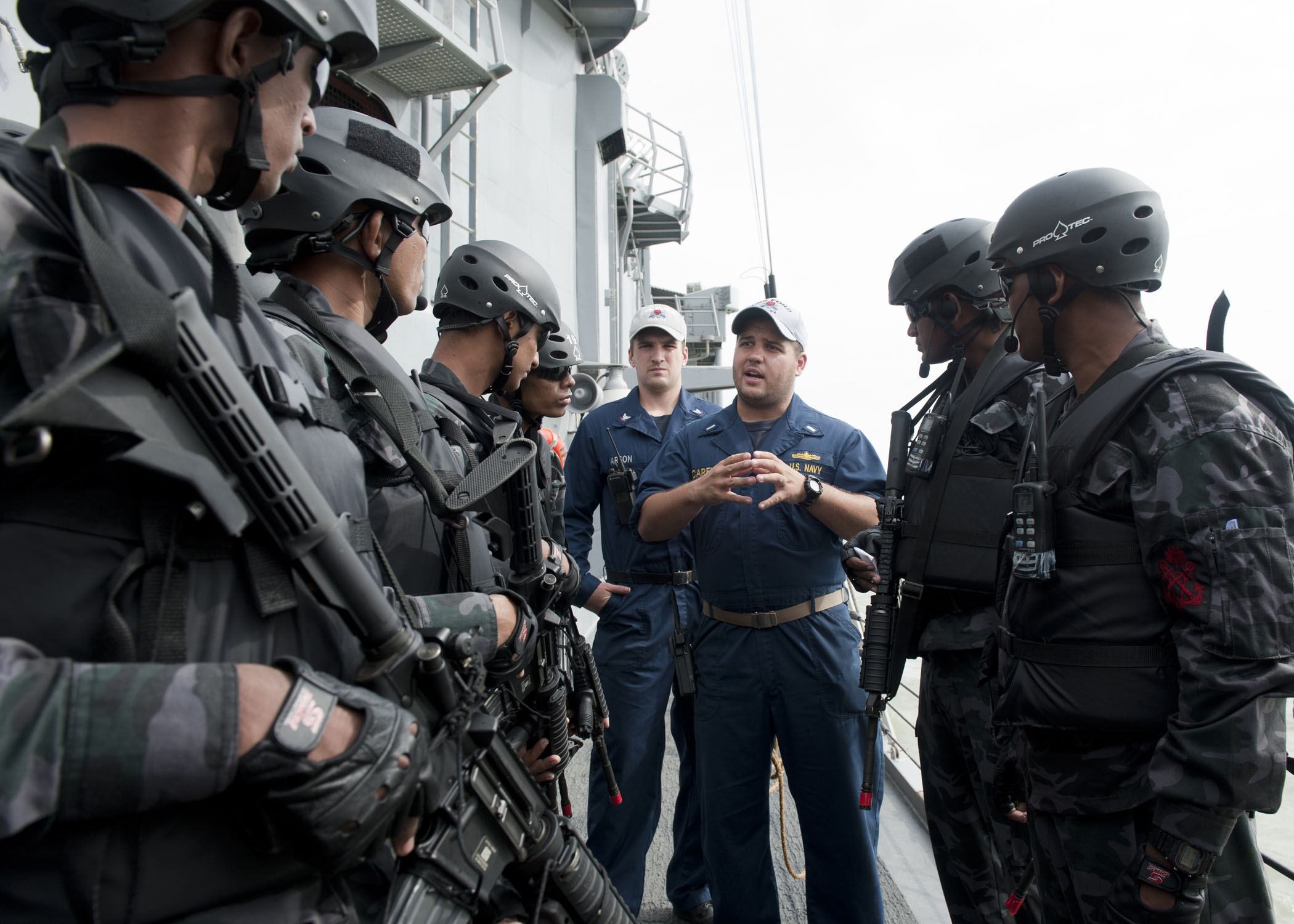
SWADS personnel on a joint military exercise with the US Navy in 2011

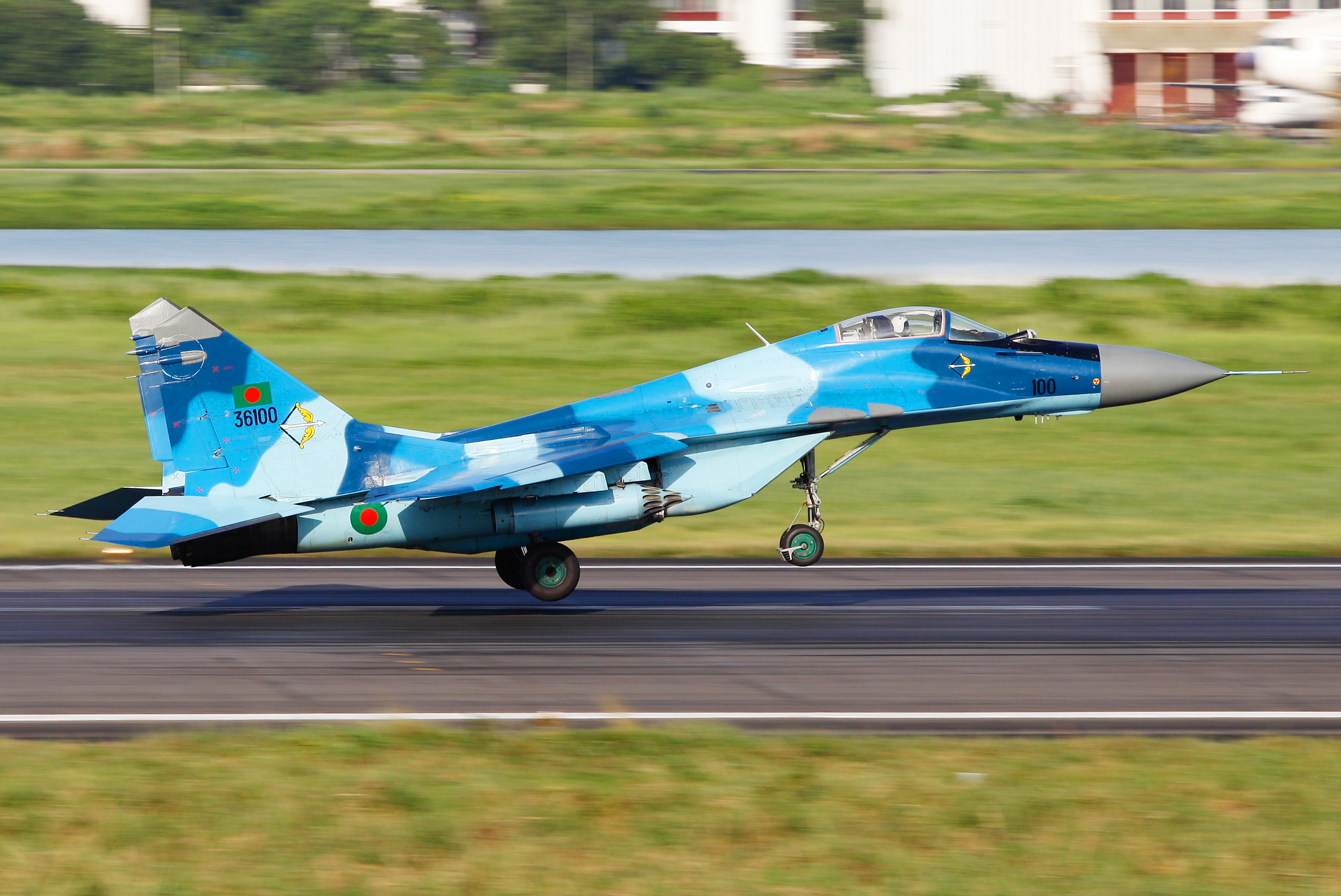
Mikoyan MiG-29 multirole fighter aircraft

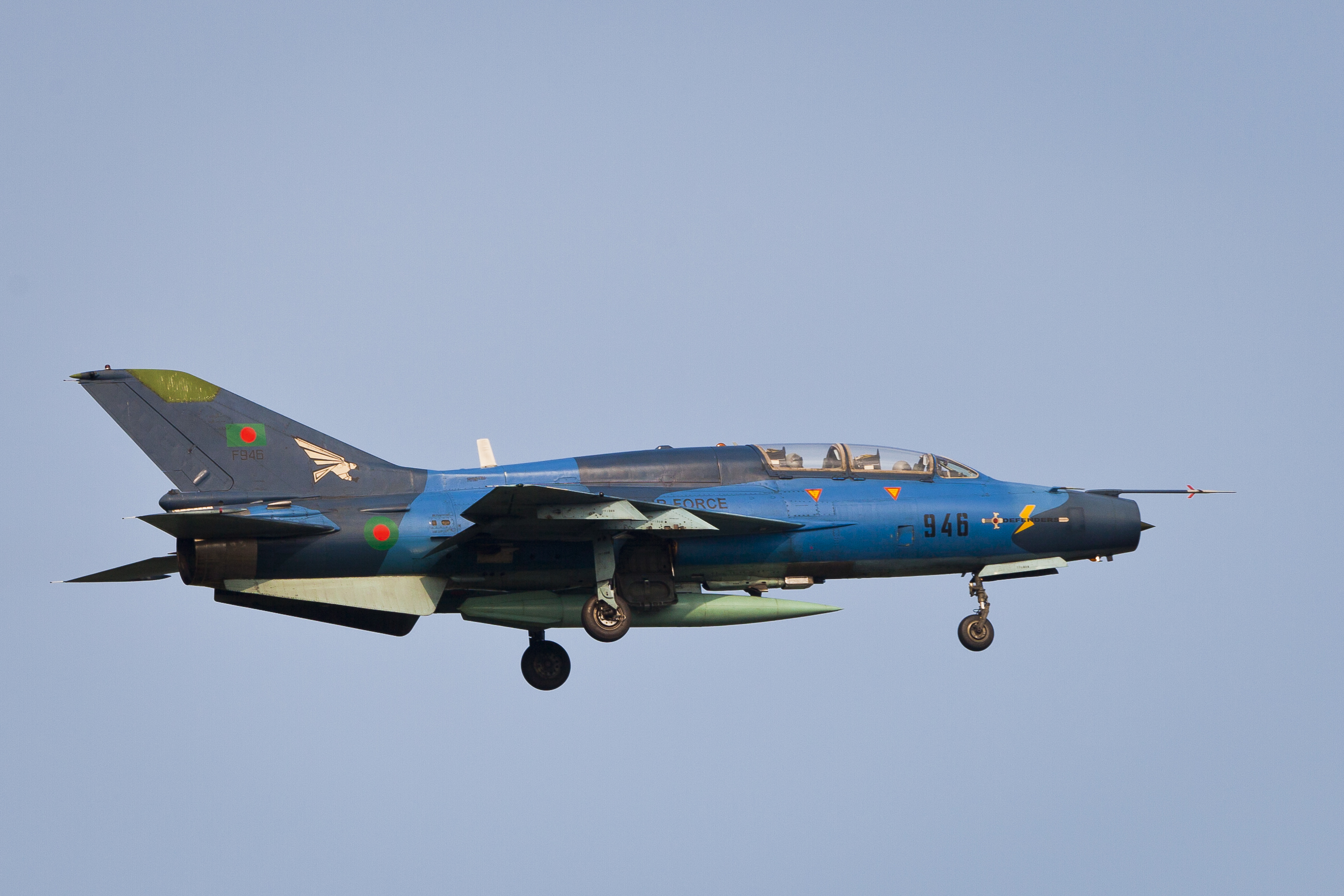
Chengdu F-7 BG fighter aircraft

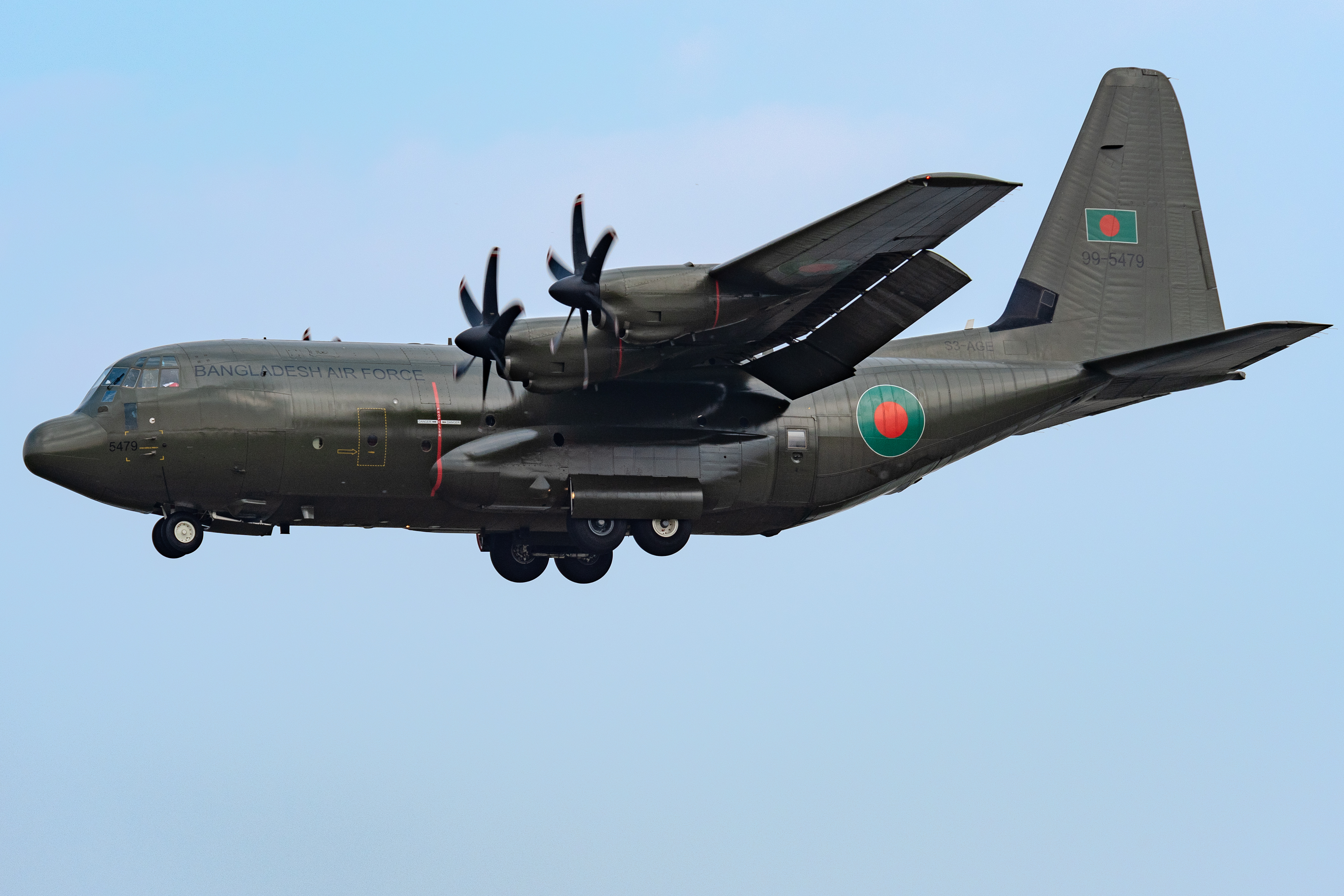
Lockheed Martin C-130J Super Hercules military transport aircraft

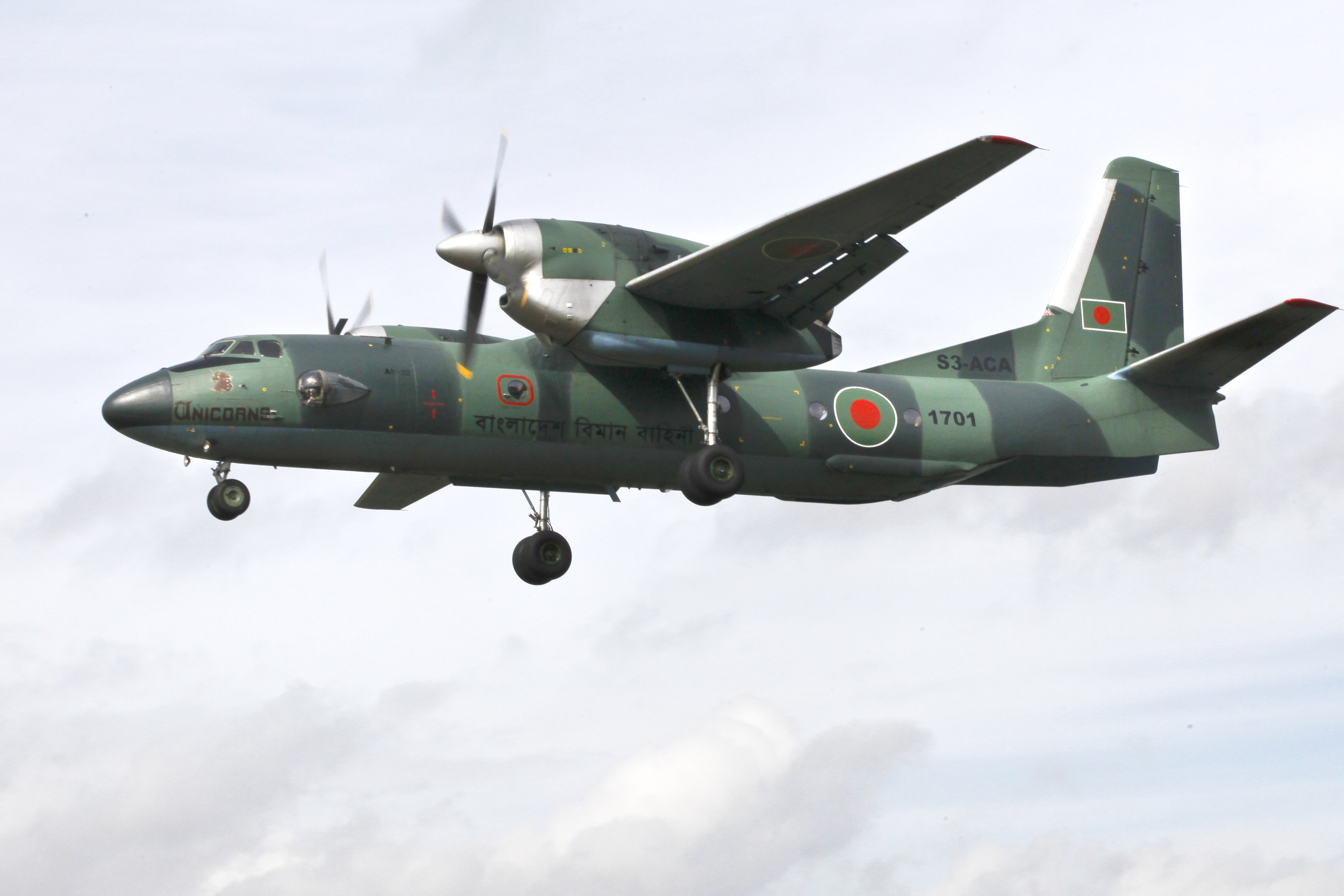
Antonov An-32 (converted bomber)

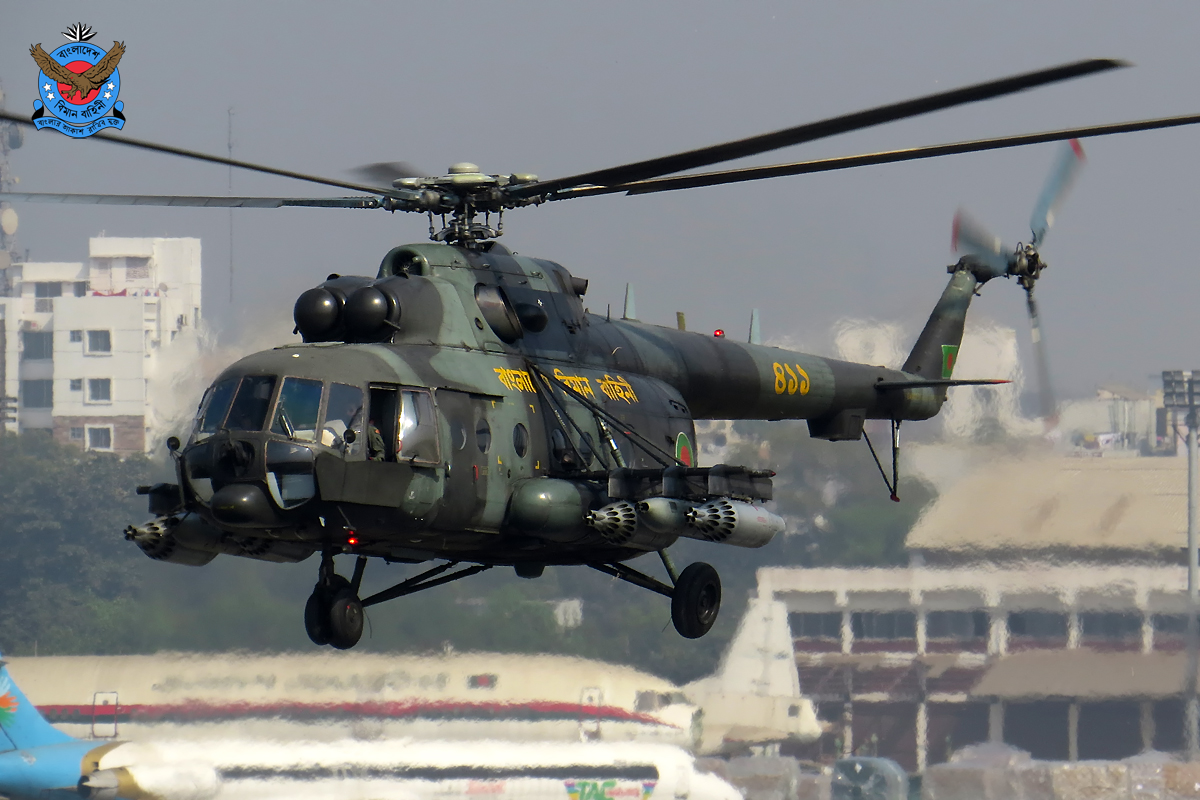
Mil Mi-171Sh assault helicopter

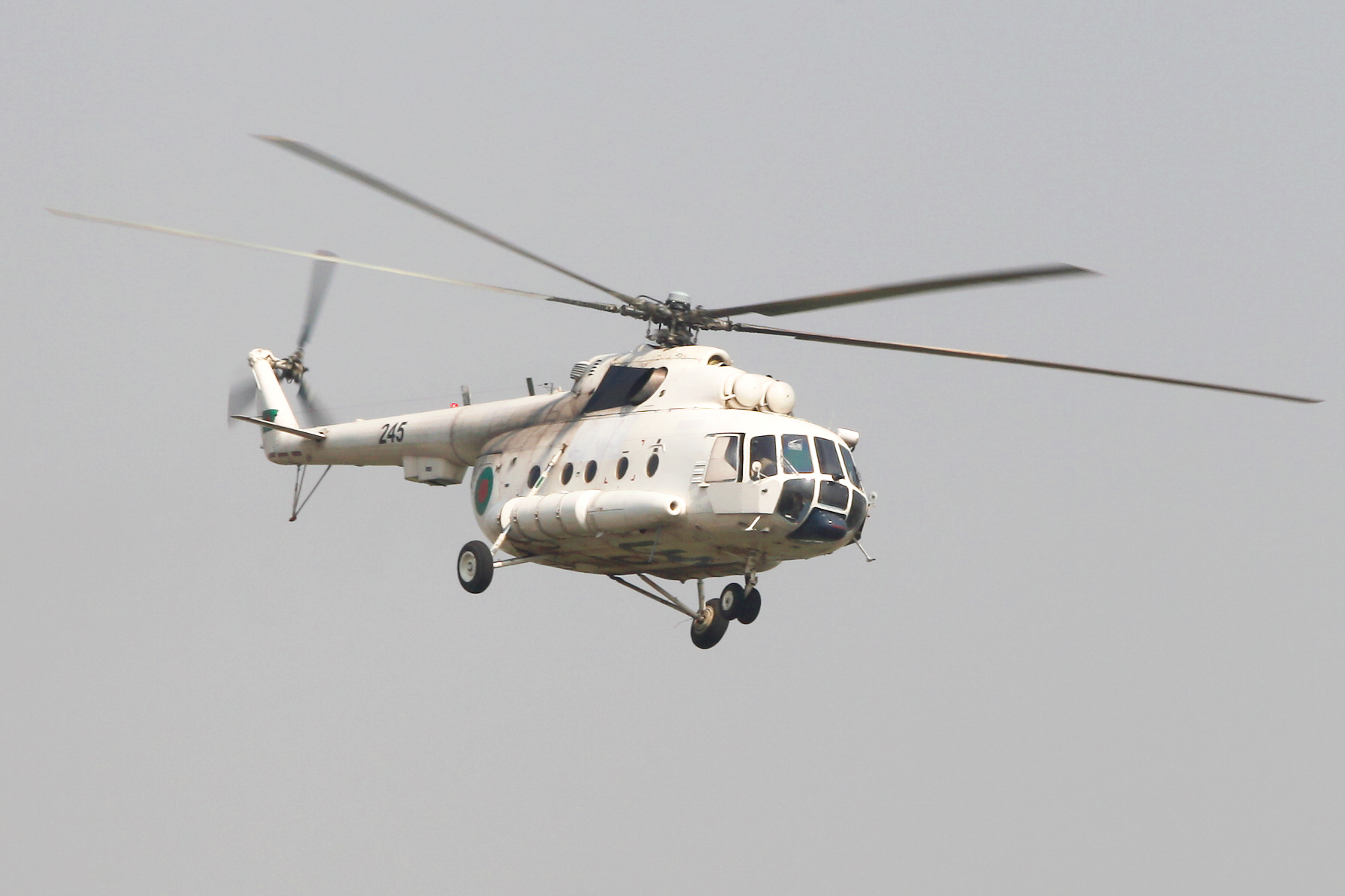
Mil Mi-17 helicopter at UN Peacekeeping mission

Air Force paratroopers descend from a C-130 aircraft

== See also ==
- Forces Goal 2030
- Government of Bangladesh
- Military coups in Bangladesh
- Ministry of Defence (Bangladesh)
