= Borders of Bangladesh =

Political boundaries between Bangladesh and neighboring territories

The borders of Bangladesh define the geographical boundaries of the People's Republic of Bangladesh, a South Asian country located on the Bay of Bengal. Encompassing a total length of approximately 4,427 kilometers, Bangladesh shares its borders with India to the west, north, and east, and with Myanmar to the southeast.

The southern boundary is demarcated by the coastline along the Bay of Bengal. The border with India is one of the longest in the world, stretching over 4,096 kilometers, and is characterized by a complex mix of rivers, hills, and plains. The border with Myanmar, although significantly shorter at 271 kilometers, traverses through the hilly and forested regions of the Chittagong Hill Tracts. These borders have been shaped by historical treaties, colonial legacies, and geopolitical considerations, influencing the cultural and economic interactions between Bangladesh and its neighboring countries. The borders also play a crucial role in regional security, trade, and migration, making them a significant aspect of Bangladesh's national identity and international relations.

== India ==
The Bangladesh–India border, known locally as the Radcliffe line, separates six Bangladeshi divisions and five Indian states. At 4,096 kilometres (2,545 mi), it is the sixth-longest land border in the world, including 262 km (163 mi) in Assam, 856 km (532 mi) in Tripura, 318 km (198 mi) in Mizoram, 443 km (275 mi) in Meghalaya and 2,217 km (1,378 mi) in West Bengal. The Bangladeshi divisions of Mymensingh, Khulna, Rajshahi, Rangpur, Sylhet, and Chittagong are situated along the border. A number of pillars mark the border between the two states. Small demarcated portions of the border are fenced on both sides.

== Myanmar ==
The Bangladesh–Myanmar border is the international border between the countries of Bangladesh and Myanmar (formerly Burma). The border stretches 271.0 kilometres (168.4 miles), from the tripoint with India in the north to the Bay of Bengal in the south. About 210 km (130 mi) of the border is fenced, with the government of Myanmar announcing in 2017 that it was planning to fence off the rest of the border.

On 9 December 2024, Arakan Army captured all of the Burmese military outposts and seized control of Myanmar's border with Bangladesh after an intense battle in Maungdaw.
