= Bangladesh special operations forces =

Military units trained to conduct special operations

Bangladesh special operations forces are military units trained to conduct special operations. They are "specially designated, organized, trained, and equipped forces, manned with selected personnel, using unconventional tactics, techniques, and modes of employment".

== History ==
During the Bangladesh Liberation War, a naval commando unit was placed under Commander-in-chief Colonel M. A. G. Osmani. They conducted major special operations in the seaport of Chittagong and at river ports Mongla, Narayanganj, and Chandpur.

The first post-independence special forces were launched in 1992.

== Organization ==
Bangladesh Police

- Special Response Battalion
- SWAT (Bangladesh)

Bangladesh Army

- Para Commando Brigade

Bangladesh Navy

- Special Warfare Diving and Salvage (SWADS)

Bangladesh airforce

- 41 Squadron Airborne

== Former Units ==
- Rapid Action Battalion
- Crack Platoon
