= 41 Squadron Airborne =

Bangladesh Air Force special operations unit

- Country: Bangladesh
- Branch: Bangladesh Air Force
- Type: Special Mission Unit
- Size: Classified
- Mottos: Unrestrained, Indomitable, Impenetrable; Bengali: দুর্দম, দুরন্ত, দুর্বার

BAF41 Squadron Airborne Units being deployed

The 41 Squadron Airborne is a special operations force of the Bangladesh Air Force based in Rajendrapur. This commando unit was formed to protect the country's air bases, aircraft, and other air force installations and assets. The members of this unit are trained by Para Commando Brigade (Bangladesh). They specialize in air assaults, paratrooper missions, and special aviation operations.

== See also ==
- Bangladesh Special Operations Forces
