= BNS Mongla =

Bangladesn Naval base in Khulna

- Mongla, Khulna, Bangladesh

Site information
- Type: Naval base
- Controlled by: Bangladesh Navy
- Website: http://navy.mil.bd/

Site history
- In use: 1987 - present

Garrison information
- Current commander: Rear Admiral Golam Sadeq

BNS Mongla is a naval base of the Bangladesh Navy located in the southwestern part of Bangladesh. It is situated on the banks of the Pussur River in Mongla Upazila of Bagerhat district, about 70 kilometers south of Khulna city.

== Functions ==
For its military importance, BNS Mongla serves as an important base for the protection of the country's economy on Mongla port channel.

== See also ==
- Bangladesh Navy
- Khulna Shipyard
