= List of equipment of the Bangladesh Navy =

Bangladesh Navy
- Crest of the Bangladesh Navy

The following is a list of equipment of the Bangladesh Navy.

== Vessel based weapon systems ==
=== Machine guns ===
Image	Name	Origin	Type	Caliber	Notes
	M240B	United States	General-purpose machine gun	7.62×51mm	Used on Defender-class boats.
	L44A1 (FN MAG)	Belgium; United Kingdom	General-purpose machine gun	7.62×51mm	Used on Island-class OPV, Meghna-class OPV, River-class Minesweeper
	CIS 50MG	Singapore	Heavy machine gun	12.7×99mm	Used on the Padma-class since the ordering of additional vessels in 2019.

=== Missiles ===
Image	Name	Origin	Type	Range	Notes
	Otomat Mk 2 Block IV	Italy; France	Anti-ship missile	180 km	10 units delivered 2001, to be used by BNS Khalid Bin Walid
	C-802	China	Anti-ship missile	120 km	10 delivered 2008, to be used by Type 056 corvettes
	C-802A	China	Anti-ship missile	180 km	90 delivered 2014-19, to be used by Type 053H3 frigates and Type 053H2 frigates
	C-704	China	Anti-ship missile	35 km	16 delivered 2013, to be used by Castle-class patrol vessels, Type 021 missile boats, and Durjoy-class patrol craft
	FM-90N	China	Surface-to-air missile	15 km	275 delivered 2007-22, to be used by Type 053H3 frigates
	FL-3000N	China	Surface-to-air missile	9 km	100 delivered 2015-19, to be used by Type 056 corvettes

=== Torpedoes ===
Image	Name	Origin	Type	Range	Notes
	Yu-4	China	Torpedo	6-15 km	60 units delivered in 2016, to be used by Type 035 submarines
	A244-S	Italy	Torpedo	13.5 km	10 delivered 2001, to be used by BNS Khalid Bin Walid

== Regular service small arms ==
=== Pistols ===
Image	Name	Origin	Type	Caliber	Notes
	Type 54	China	Semi-automatic pistol	7.62×25mm	In reserve use.
	Type 92	China	Semi-automatic pistol	9×19mm	Standard issue sidearm.

=== Submachine guns ===
Image	Name	Origin	Type	Caliber	Notes
	Heckler and Koch MP5	Germany	sub-machine gun	9×19mm	
	Daewoo K7	Republic of Korea	sub-machine gun	9×19mm	

=== Assault rifles ===
Image	Name	Origin	Type	Caliber	Notes
	Type 56	China; Bangladesh	Assault rifle	7.62×39mm	Assembled locally by BOF.
	BD-08 (Type 81)	China; Bangladesh	Assault rifle	7.62×39mm	Produced under license by BOF.

=== Machine guns ===
Image	Name	Origin	Type	Caliber	Notes
	BD-15 LMG (Type 81 LMG)	China; Bangladesh	Light machine gun	7.62×39mm	Produced under license by BOF
	M240B	United States	General-purpose machine gun	7.62×51mm	
	L44A1 (FN MAG)	Belgium; United Kingdom	General-purpose machine gun	7.62×51mm	
	CIS 50MG	Singapore	Heavy machine gun	12.7×99mm	

== Special Warfare Diving and Salvage ==
Special Warfare Diving and Salvage as a special forces branch of the Bangladesh Navy uses a more diverse kit of equipment.

=== Pistols ===
Image	Name	Origin	Type	Caliber	Notes
	SIG Sauer P226	Germany; Switzerland	Semi-automatic pistol	9×19mm	

=== Submachine guns ===
Image	Name	Origin	Type	Caliber	Notes
	Heckler and Koch MP5	Germany	sub-machine gun	9×19mm	
	Daewoo K7	Republic of Korea	sub-machine gun	9×19mm	

=== Assault rifles ===
Image	Name	Origin	Type	Caliber	Notes
	M4A1	United States	Assault rifle	5.56×45mm	
	Dasan Machineries DSAR-15	Republic of Korea	Assault rifle	5.56×45mm	
	Norinco Type-56-2	China	Assault rifle	7.62×39mm	

=== Sniper rifles ===
Image	Name	Origin	Type	Caliber	Notes
	M24	United States	Bolt action sniper rifle	7.62×51mm	
	SR-25	United States	Designated marksman rifle	7.62×51mm	

=== Machine guns ===
Image	Name	Origin	Type	Caliber	Notes
	M249 SAW	Belgium; United States	Light machine gun	5.56×45mm	
