= List of active Bangladesh Navy ships =

Naval Ensign of Bangladesh Navy

The insignia of Bangladesh Navy

The Bangladesh Navy currently operates two submarines, five guided missile frigates, two patrol frigates, six guided missile corvettes, minor surface combatants of various type of offshore patrol vessels, coastal patrol boats, missile boats, minesweepers, auxiliaries, amphibious landing craft and rapid response boats.

Bangladesh Navy vessels use the prefix BNS, standing for Bangladesh Navy Ship.

== Submarines ==
Class	Picture	Type	Ships	Origin	Displacement	Note
Active (2)
Type 035G (Ming class)		Attack submarine	BNS Nabajatra (S161) BNS Joyjatra (S162)	China	2,110 tons	The submarines were commissioned on 12 March 2017.

== Surface fleet ==
=== Frigates ===
Class	Picture	Type	Ships	Origin	Displacement	Note
Active (7)
Ulsan class (Modified)		Guided missile frigate	BNS Khalid Bin Walid (F25)	South Korea	2,500 tons	The only frigate of the Bangladesh Navy which is armed with ASW torpedo and gun based CIWS.
Type 053H3 (Jiangwei II) class		Guided missile frigate	BNS Umar Farooq (F16) BNS Abu Ubaidah (F19)	China	2,393 tons	
Type 053H2 (Jianghu-III) class		Guided missile frigate	BNS Abu Bakr (F15) BNS Ali Haider (F17)	China	2,000 tons	
Hamilton class		High endurance cutter	BNS Somudra Joy (F28) BNS Somudra Avijan (F29)	United States	3,250 tons	

=== Corvettes ===
Class	Picture	Type	Ships	Origin	Displacement	Note
Active (6)
Type 056 Shadhinota class		Stealth guided missile corvette	BNS Shadhinota (F111) BNS Prottoy (F112) BNS Shongram (F113) BNS Prottasha (F114)	China	1,330 tons	Customized C-13B variant of the Bangladesh Navy which lacks ASW torpedo and sonar.
Castle class		Guided missile corvette	BNS Bijoy (F35) BNS Dhaleshwari (F36)	United Kingdom	1,430 tons	The Bangladesh Navy upgraded Castle-class patrol vessels with more armaments and sensors.

=== Offshore patrol vessels ===
Class	Picture	Type	Ships	Origin	Displacement	Note
Active (5)
Island class		Offshore patrol vessel	BNS Sangu (P713) BNS Turag (P714) BNS Kapatakhaya (P912) BNS Karatoa (P913) BNS Gomati (P914)	United Kingdom	1,280 tons	

=== Large patrol craft ===
Class	Picture	Type	Ships	Origin	Displacement	Note
Active (4)
Durjoy class		Large patrol craft	BNS Durjoy (P811) BNS Nirmul (P813) BNS Durgam (P814) BNS Nishan (P815)	China Bangladesh	648 tons	First two were built by Wuchang Shipyard as surface warfare ships armed with anti-ship missiles. Last two were built by Khulna Shipyard with Chinese technical assistance as anti-submarine warfare vessels armed with ASW torpedoes.
Sea Dragon class		Large patrol craft	BNS Madhumati (P911)	South Korea	635 tons	

=== Coastal patrol crafts ===
Class	Picture	Type	Ships	Origin	Displacement	Note
Active (12)
Padma class		Coastal patrol craft	BNS Padma (P312) BNS Surma (P313) BNS Aparajeya (P261) BNS Adamya (P262) BNS Atandra (P263) BNS Shaheed Daulat (P411) BNS Shaheed Farid (P412) BNS Shaheed Mohibullah (P413) BNS Shaheed Akhtaruddin (P414) BNS Bishkhali (P415)	Bangladesh	350 tons	These patrol crafts were built by Khulna Shipyard.
Meghna class		Coastal patrol craft	BNS Meghna (P211) BNS Jamuna (P212)	Singapore	410 tons	

=== Fast attack craft ===
Class	Picture	Type	Ships	Origin	Displacement	Note
Missile boat (4)
Type 021-class missile boat		Missile boat	BNS Durdharsha (P8125) BNS Durdanto (P8126) BNS Durdondo (P8128) BNS Anirban (P8131)	China	205 tons	Armed with C-704 anti-ship missile.
Anti-submarine warfare vessel (1)
Haizhui-class submarine chaser		Submarine chaser	BNS Barkat (P711)	China	170 tons	A larger version of Shanghai II class.
Gunboat (5)
Type 021-class gun boat		Gunboat	BNS Salam (P712)	China	205 tons	
Chamsuri class		Gunboat	BNS Titash (P1011) BNS Kusiyara (P1012) BNS Chitra (P1013) BNS Dhansiri (P1014)	South Korea	143 tons	BNS Chitra is being used as training ship.

=== Mine countermeasure vessels ===
Class	Picture	Type	Ships	Origin	Displacement	Note
Active (5)
River class		Minesweeper	BNS Shapla (M95) BNS Shaikat (M96) BNS Surovi (M97) BNS Shaibal (M98)	United Kingdom	904 tons	
Type 010	-	Minesweeper	BNS Sagar (M91)	China	569 tons	

=== High speed boats ===
Class	Picture	Type	Quantity	Origin	Displacement	Note
X12 Fast patrol craft		High-speed patrol boat	8	Bangladesh; Indonesia	10.78 tons	The boats are being built by Dockyard and Engineering Works Limited under licence from PT Lundin Indonesia. 8 of 18 vessels are commissioned with Bangladesh Navy. These 11.7 meters long boats are armed with a 12.7 mm machine gun mount on cabin top and two additional gun mounts on the after deck.
Metal Shark Boats		Rapid response boat	6	United States	-	Used by Special Warfare Diving and Salvage.
Defender-class boat		Rapid response boat	16	United States	8.5 tons	

== Amphibious warfare fleet ==
=== Landing craft utility (LCU) ===
Class	Picture	Type	Ships	Origin	Displacement	Note
Active (9)
Dolphin class		Landing craft utility	BNS Dolphin BNS Timi BNS Tuna BNS Penguin	Bangladesh	-	Built by Khulna Shipyard. Commissioned on 12 July 2023.
Swandwip class	-	Landing craft utility	BNS Swandwip (L903) BNS Hatiya (L904)	Bangladesh	-	These 42 meters long Landing Craft Utilities were built by Khulna Shipyard and commissioned in Bangladesh Navy on 6 September 2015. Each one is capable of carrying 415 tons of cargo.
LCU 1512 class	-	Landing craft utility	BNS Shah Poran (L901) BNS Shah Makhdum (L902)	United States	375 tons	These 41.1 meters long Landing Craft Utilities can carry 170 tons of cargo. Both were commissioned on 16 May 1992.
Shah Amanat class	-	Landing craft utility	BNS Shah Amanat (L900)	Denmark	366 tons	This 47-metre (154 ft 2 in) long Landing Craft Utility can carry 150 tons of cargo. It entered service in 1990.

=== Landing craft tank (LCT) ===
Class	Picture	Type	Ships	Origin	Displacement	Note
Active (3)
LCT		Landing craft tank	BN LCT 101(A584) BN LCT 103(A586) BN LCT 105(A588)	Bangladesh	-	LCT 101 was built by Khulna Shipyard Limited and launched by Bangladesh Navy on 15 January 2026. These 25.6 meters long landing craft tanks were built by Dockyard and Engineering Works Limited and commissioned in Bangladesh Navy on 6 September 2015.

=== Landing craft mechanized (LCM) ===
Class	Picture	Type	Ships	Origin	Displacement	Note
Active (4)
Yuch'in class	-	Landing craft mechanized	BNS LCM 101(A583) BNS LCM 102(A584) BNS LCM 103(A585) BNS LCM 104(A587)	China	85 tons	These 25 meters long vessels were received between 4 May-1 July 1986.

=== Landing craft vehicle & personnel (LCVP) ===
Class	Picture	Type	Ships	Origin	Displacement	Note
Active (3)
L1011 class	-	Landing craft vehicle personnel	BNS L1011 BNS L1012 BNS L1013	Bangladesh	83 tons	These LCVPs have a length of 21.3 meters. LCVP-011 and LCVP-012 were built by Khulna Shipyard. LCVP-013 was built by Dockyard and Engineering Works Limited, Narayanganj.

== Auxiliary vessels ==
=== Floating drydock ===
Class	Picture	Type	Ships	Origin	Displacement	Note
Active (1)
Sundarban class		Floating drydock	BNFD Sundarban (A711)	Yugoslavia	3,500 tons	This floating drydock was acquired from Yugoslavia on 15 August 1980. It was built by Tito Shipyard, Trogir, Yugoslavia. It has a length of 117 meters and 27.6 meters wide. It has the lift capacity of 3,500 tons.

=== Research and survey ships ===
Class	Picture	Type	Ships	Origin	Displacement	Note
Active (4)
Roebuck class		Hydrographic survey ship	BNS Anushandhan (H584)	United Kingdom	1,477 tons	
Darshak class	-	Hydrographic survey ship	BNS Darshak (H581) BNS Tallashi (H582)	Bangladesh	-	These survey ships were built by Khulna Shipyard and commissioned on 5 November 2020. General characteristics: 32.78 m length, 8.40 m breadth and 3.17 m draught with 2 × 600 hp engines.
Agradoot class	-	Hydrographic survey ship	BNS Agradoot (H583)	Bangladesh	-	This 45 meters long coastal survey ship was acquired in 1996 from commercial service and commissioned in 1998. It was upgraded with Sophisticated EA400 single-beam echo sounders in 2010.
Upcoming (2)
Jarip boat	-	Survey boat	BNS JB-01 BNS JB-02	Bangladesh	-	These survey ships were built by Khulna Shipyard and launched on 14 May 2020. They are under sea trial. General characteristics: 14.7 m length, 5.1 m breadth and 1.5 m draught with 2 × 300 hp engines.

=== Replenishment ships ===
Class	Picture	Type	Ships	Origin	Displacement	Note
Active (2)
Khan Jahan Ali class		Fleet tanker	BNS Khan Jahan Ali (A515)	Bangladesh	2,774 tons	This 80 meters long ship was built by Ananda Shipyard & Slipways Limited and commissioned on 6 September 2015. It can supply 2,400 tons of diesel and 120 tons of aviation fuel.
Imam Ghazzali class	-	Fleet tanker	BNS Imam Ghazzali (A516)	Bangladesh	650 tons	This 45 meters long commercial tanker entered service in 1996. It can supply 350 tons of fuel.

=== Ship's tender ===
Class	Picture	Type	Ships	Origin	Displacement	Note
Active (3)
MFV 55	-	Fleet tender	BNS MFV 55	Bangladesh	-	
MFV 66	-	Fleet tender	BNS MFV 66	Bangladesh	-	
Shanket class	-	Harbour tender	BNS Shanket	Bangladesh	-	

=== Diving support vessel ===
Class	Picture	Type	Ships	Origin	Displacement	Note
Active (4)
Shah Jalal class	-	Fleet diving & salvage tender	BNS Shah Jalal (A513)	Bangladesh	600 tons	
Pankouri class		Diving support vessel	BNS Pankouri BNS Gangchil BNS Machranga	Bangladesh	≥260 tons	General characteristics: 38.9 meters overall length, 4 meters breadth, 4.5 meters depth, maximum speed 15 knots, 2 × 1609 hp caterpillar diesel engines, armed with single 12.7 mm heavy machine gun. Based on ACMB project of Turkish shipyard DESAN.

=== Tugboats ===
Class	Picture	Type	Ships	Origin	Displacement	Note
Active (6)
Type 837	-	Fleet ocean tug	BNT Khadem (A721)	China	1,472 tons	This ship was built by Wuhu Shipyard, China and commissioned 6 May 1984.
Sebak class	-	Fleet coastal tug	BNT Sebak (A722)	Bangladesh	400 tons	
Damen Stan Tug 3008	-	Fleet coastal tug	BNT Rupsha (A723) BNT Shibsha (A724)	Bangladesh; Netherlands	330 tons	These ships were built by Khulna Shipyard with Dutch assistance. They incorporate equipment and materials of South Korean origin. Both Rupsha and Shibsha commissioned 3 October 2004.
Halda class	-	Submarine tug	BNT Halda (A725) BNT Poshur (A726)	Bangladesh	-	These ships were built by Khulna Shipyard and commissioned on 8 November 2017.

=== Miscellaneous ===
Class	Picture	Type	Ships	Origin	Displacement	Note
Active (2)
Sahayak class	-	Repair ship	BNS Sahayak (A512)	Bangladesh	-	Used as a tender/repair ship since 1978.
Balaban class	-	Floating crane	BNFC Balaban (A731)	Bangladesh	650 tons	This self-propelled floating crane was built by Khulna Shipyard in 1987 and commissioned in 18 May 1988. It has a lift capacity of 70 tons.

== See also ==
- List of ships of the Bangladesh Coast Guard
- List of historic ships of the Bangladesh Navy
