= BNS Surma (2013) =

2013 Padma-class offshore patrol vessel of the Bangladesh Navy

History

Bangladesh
- Name: BNS Surma
- Ordered: 2 May 2010
- Builder: Khulna Shipyard
- Laid down: 5 March 2011
- Launched: 23 January 2013
- Acquired: 6 May 2013
- Commissioned: 29 August 2013
- Home port: Khulna
- Identification: Pennant number: P 313
- Status: In Active Service

General characteristics
- Class & type: Padma-class offshore patrol vessel
- Displacement: 350 tonnes
- Length: 50.4 metres (165 ft)
- Beam: 7.5 metres (25 ft)
- Draught: 4.1 metres (13 ft)
- Propulsion: 2 shafts, 2 diesels
- Speed: 23 knots (43 km/h)
- Endurance: 7 days
- Boats & landing craft carried: 1 x RIB boat
- Complement: 45 personnel
- Armament: 2 × 37mm canon; 2 × 20mm AA guns; Naval Mines

BNS Surma is a Padma-class offshore patrol vessel of the Bangladesh Navy. She has been serving the Bangladesh Navy since 2013.

== Career ==
The ship was ordered on 2 May 2010 and launched on 23 January 2013. She was handed over to the Bangladesh Navy on 6 May 2013. On 29 August 2013, she was commissioned to the Bangladesh Navy. She is currently serving under the command of Commodore Commanding BN Khulna (COMKHUL).

== Design ==
BNS Surma is 50.4 metres (165 ft) long, 7.5 metres (25 ft) wide and 4.1 metres (13 ft) high. The vessel has a displacement of 350 tonnes. She has a top speed of 23 knots (43 km/h; 26 mph). Her complement is 45 persons and she can carry out missions lasting up to seven days at a time.

== Armament ==
The ship is equipped with a pair of 20 mm anti-aircraft guns and a pair of 37 mm guns. The vessel can also be equipped with naval mines and MANPADS.

== See also ==
- BNS Padma
- BNS Aparajeya
- BNS Adamya
- BNS Atandra
- List of active ships of the Bangladesh Navy
