= BNS Shaheed Farid =

Two ships of the Bangladesh Navy carried the name BNS Shaheed Farid:

- BNS Shaheed Farid (1982), a Type 062 class gunboat acquired from China.
- BNS Shaheed Farid (2022), a Padma-class patrol vessel, launched in 2022.
