= BNS Bishkhali =

Two ships of Bangladesh Navy carried the name BNS Bishkhali:

- BNS Bishkhali (1978), ex-Pakistan Navy ship PNS Jessore, salvaged and repaired after the Bangladesh Liberation War.
- BNS Bishkhali (2024), a Padma-class patrol vessel currently in service.
