= BNS Shaheed Akhtaruddin =

Two ships of the Bangladesh Navy carried the name BNS Shaheed Akhtaruddin:

- BNS Shaheed Akhtaruddin (1982), a Type 062 class gunboat acquired from China.
- BNS Shaheed Akhtaruddin (2023), a Padma-class patrol vessel, launched in 2022.
