= Attacks on shipping in Lough Foyle (1981–82) =

IRA bombings in Ireland

Coordinates: 55°10′34″N 7°3′50″W

- Part of the Troubles
- The coaster Nellie M after the bombing
- Location: Lough Foyle
- Date: 6 February 1981; 23 February 1982
- Target: 2 cargo ships 2,000 BRT
- Attack type: Ship hijacking, bombing
- Weapons: 2 pilot boats 4 explosive charges
- Deaths: none
- Injuries: none
- Perpetrator: Provisional Irish Republican Army
- Assailants: 24
- Motive: To hinder British shipping around the port of Derry

The Provisional Irish Republican Army (IRA) carried out two bomb attacks against British coal ships in February 1981 and February 1982 at Lough Foyle, a large inlet between County Londonderry in Northern Ireland and County Donegal in the Republic of Ireland. The IRA used hijacked pilot boats to board the ships. Both vessels were sunk, but their crews reached the coastline safely in lifeboats.

== Early attacks on shipping ==
There had been a number of attacks on small vessels by the IRA before 1981. In April 1971, a Royal Navy survey launch was blown up at the port of Baltimore, in the Republic of Ireland. The motor boat, the Stork, was towed out to sea and destroyed by an explosive device before dawn, while the crew was ashore. Another British boat, the Puffin, received minor damage in the same action. Both motor launches were attached to HMS Hecate.

Between February and October 1972 the Provisional IRA carried out two bombings against sand barges at Lough Neagh. Two IRA members were killed by the premature explosion of one of the devices, while two of the barges were sunk in a second incident, with a loss of £80,000. These barges were probably the Lough Neagh and the Ballyginniff.

On 16 March 1977 an IRA sniper, hidden in the grounds of a church at Omeath, County Louth, on the Republic, fired two shots at the Royal Navy patrol ship HMS Vigilant in Carlingford Lough. Royal Marines onboard fired back. No hits were scored by either side.

The killing of Lord Mountbatten and three others at Mullaghmore, County Sligo, took place when they were on board Mountbatten's fishing boat, the Shadow V, on 27 August 1979.

== Background ==
The IRA's declared aim was to disrupt the maritime traffic to and from Londonderry Port, on the east bank of the lough. They also intended to force British and Irish authorities to deploy security guards on board merchant ships. The IRA stated that they regarded the ships as "commercial targets".

On the British side, the Bird class patrol boats HMS Cygnet and HMS Kingfisher were already assigned by the Royal Navy to protect the waterways of the province. Their mission was to prevent the smuggling of weapons from the Republic. These warships were often shot at by the IRA, especially from Carlingford Lough.

== Sinking of Nellie M ==
The coaster Nellie M in 1974

Nellie M was a coaster ship of 782 BRT, launched in 1972 at Yorkshire. She was owned by S. William Coe & Co. Ltd. of Liverpool at the time of the attack, which took place on 6 February 1981. The vessel was at anchor barely 300 yards (270 m) from the Republic's shore, awaiting for proceeding up the river. The coal ship had departed from Liverpool with a cargo valued at £1 million.

A team of 12 IRA men, meanwhile, had hijacked a pilot boat at a pier on Moville, on the northwest bank of the inlet. Five of the group remained watching on shore, while another seven members of the ASU, carrying two high explosive charges, forced the skipper to take them to the British coal ship. Once on board, the cell informed her captain, Ian Eves, about their intentions and ordered him to gather the crew and to get his men into the lifeboat. Four IRA members supervised the evacuation. At the same time, three others planted the charges in the engine room. The hijacked motor launch then took in tow the lifeboat, leaving her adrift close to the eastern shore, and headed back for Moville. As the lifeboat reached the beach, the first explosion shook Nellie M. Huge flames, visible from several miles away, engulfed her bridge. A second blast, some hours later, blew up the bulkheads and the ship began to sink. The morning after, her stern was submerged. The hull was raised in 1982.

== Sinking of St. Bedan ==
The next year, the IRA was able to repeat the same operation against another British coal ship, St. Bedan, bound from Glasgow to Derry. The 1,250 BRT Bedan, built in Clyde and also launched in 1972, was owned by J & A Gardner & Co. Ltd. of Glasgow. On 23 February 1982, the ship was at anchor five nautical miles northeast of Derry, awaiting the tide to proceed upstream.

Once again, the armed IRA boarding party was composed of 12 volunteers. The attack was again launched from the pilot boat based at Moville, and the IRA seaborne unit took advantage of darkness and fog. Once on deck, the IRA men ordered the second on board, David Hinson, and the captain, Roderick Black, to gather the crew onto the bridge. The IRA volunteers took "some photographs of us for American propaganda", according to Hinson. The coaster's lifeboat with the crewmembers was towed to the shoreline in the same way as in the case of Nellie M. After the explosions, the cargo vessel sank on her starboard side in some 15 metres (49 ft) of water. She was raised and scrapped by November 1982.

== Aftermath and later incidents ==
RFA Fort Victoria, which was crippled by the IRA shortly after her launching in 1990 near Belfast.

One of the unexpected consequences triggered by the bombings was the debate in the Oireachtas about the dispute with the United Kingdom on the legal jurisdiction over the waterways in Northern Ireland. The salvage of Nellie M was conducted by a company from the Republic, and her wreckage was sold to a ship owner in that state, who refurbished the ship under the name of Ellie. The coal ship was subsequently bought by several companies. She was lengthened by 7 metres (23 ft) and renamed Trimix. During the 2000s she was managed by a Colombian company after being rechristened Dove. St. Bedan was instead declared a constructive total loss and scrapped at Liverpool.

The Royal Navy and the Royal Air Force increased their patrols in Northern Ireland waters following the attacks.

A bigger naval target was hit by the IRA several years later, in 1990, when an unknown number of its members managed to board RFA Fort Victoria at anchor near Belfast, shortly after her launching. They planted two large bombs in her engine room. One of the devices exploded, damaging her considerably; the second one was successfully defused.

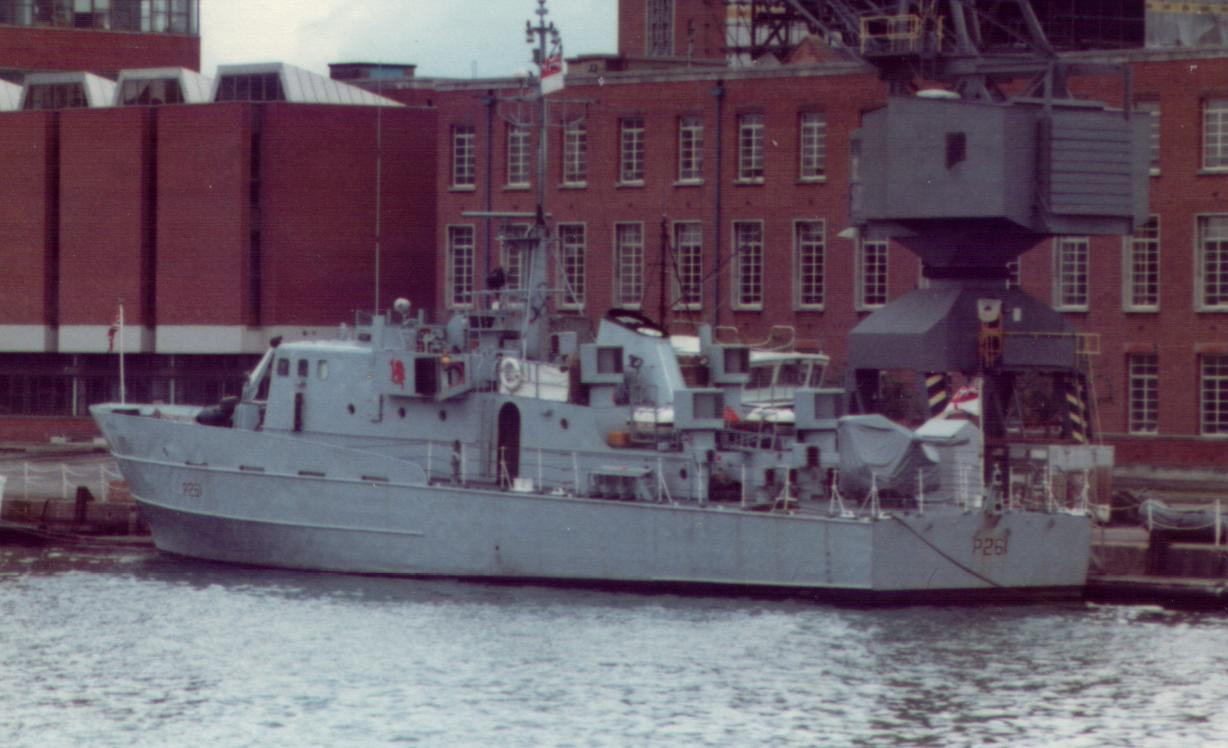
HMS Cygnet

One of the IRA sniper teams that operated in South Armagh in the final years of the conflict fired two rounds from a Barret .50 calibre rifle at Bird-class patrol vessel HMS Cygnet at Carlingford Lough in December 1993. No hits were scored.

Lough Foyle was once again the scenario of a Provisional IRA waterborne attack on 23 May 1994, when an active service unit stole a motor boat from Foyle Search and Rescue Service to plant an explosive device at the jetty of Fort George British Army base in Derry. Two soldiers were wounded, and one of them was permanently blinded by the blast.
