= HMS Amethyst =

Six ships of the Royal Navy have been named HMS Amethyst, whilst another was planned:

- HMS Amethyst (1793) was a 36-gun fifth-rate frigate, originally the French frigate Perle, launched in 1790, captured in 1793, and wrecked off Alderney in 1795.
- HMS Amethyst (1799) was a Penelope-class 36-gun fifth rate launched in 1799 and wrecked in 1811.
- HMS Amethyst (1844) was a Spartan-class 26-gun sixth rate launched in 1844 and sold in 1869 for use as a cable vessel.
- HMS Amethyst (1873) was an Amethyst-class screw corvette launched in 1873 and sold in 1887.
- HMS Amethyst (1903) was a Topaze-class cruiser launched in 1903 and scrapped in 1920.
- HMS Amethyst (F116) was a modified Black Swan-class sloop launched in 1943. She was later designated as a frigate, was involved in the Yangtze Incident in 1949 and was broken up in 1957.
- HMS Amethyst was to have been a River-class minesweeper. She was renamed HMS Waveney before being launched in 1983, and was sold to the Bangladeshi Navy in 1994, being renamed Shapla.

== Battle honours ==
Ships named Amethyst have earned the following battle honours:

- Cerbere, 1800
- Thetis, 1808
- Niemen, 1809
- China, 1856−60
- Ashantee, 1873−74
- Heligoland, 1914
- Dardanelles, 1915
- Atlantic, 1945
- Korea, 1951−52

== See also ==
- HMT Amethyst (T12) was an anti-submarine trawler requisitioned in 1935 and sunk by a mine on 24 November 1940.
- Amethyst was the Royal Navy's bridge simulator in the 1990s at HMS Dryad, named after the Black Swan-class HMS Amethyst.
