= BNS Dordanda =

History

Bangladesh
- Name: BNS Dordanda
- Builder: Jiangnan Shipyard, Shanghai
- Commissioned: 10 November 1988
- In service: 1988–present
- Identification: Pennant number: P-8128
- Status: in active service

General characteristics
- Class & type: Type 021-class missile boat
- Displacement: 171 tons standard; 205 tons full load
- Length: 38.6 m (127 ft)
- Beam: 7.6 m (25 ft)
- Draught: 2.7 m (8 ft 10 in)
- Propulsion: 3 × 4,000 hp diesel engines; Three shafts
- Speed: 35 knots (65 km/h; 40 mph)
- Range: 800 nmi (1,500 km; 920 mi) at 30 knots (56 km/h; 35 mph)
- Complement: 28
- Sensors & processing systems: 1 × Type 352 Square Tie
- Armament: 4 × C-704s; 4 × AK-230 (two twin)

BNS Dordanda is a Type 021 missile boat of the Bangladesh Navy. She was commissioned in November 1988.

== Design ==
Powered by three 4,000 hp diesel engines that drive three propellers, Dordanda has a maximum speed of 35 knots (65 km/h; 40 mph). She has a range of 800 nautical miles (1,500 km; 920 mi) at 30 knots (56 km/h; 35 mph).

The ship's armament consists of four C-704 anti-ship missiles and two AK-230 twin 30 mm guns, mounted on the bow and stern. She is equipped with one Type 352 Square Tie radar for surface search.

== Service ==
Dordanda was commissioned into the Bangladesh Navy on 10 November 1988. She was severely damaged in the cyclone of April 1991. After extensive repairs she returned to active service. In 2010, the ship was upgraded with modern C-704 replacing old SY-1 missiles as mid-life upgradation.

== See also ==
- Fast attack craft
- List of active ships of the Bangladesh Navy
- BNS Durdharsha
- BNS Durdanta
- BNS Anirban
