= BNS Salam =

History

Bangladesh Navy
- Name: BNS Durnibar
- Commissioned: 10 November 1988
- In service: 1988 – 1991
- Identification: Pennant number: P 8127
- Fate: Sunk

Bangladesh Navy
- Name: BNS Salam
- Builder: Jiangnan Shipyard, Shanghai
- Commissioned: 2002
- In service: 2002 – present
- Home port: Chattogram
- Identification: Pennant number: P 712
- Status: Active

General characteristics
- Class & type: Type 021-class gunboat
- Displacement: 171 tons standard; 205 tons full load
- Length: 38.6 m (127 ft)
- Beam: 7.6 m (25 ft)
- Draught: 2.7 m (8 ft 10 in)
- Propulsion: 3 × 4,000 hp diesel engines; Three shafts
- Speed: 35 knots (65 km/h; 40 mph)
- Range: 800 nmi (1,500 km; 920 mi) at 30 knots (56 km/h; 35 mph)
- Complement: 28
- Sensors & processing systems: 1 × Type 352 Square Tie
- Armament: 1 × 40 mm AA gun; 1 × twin 30 mm AA guns

BNS Salam is a modified Type 021 gunboat of the Bangladesh Navy. She was commissioned into the Bangladesh Navy in 2002.

== Design ==
Powered by three 4,000-horsepower (3,000 kW) diesel engines that drive three propellers, BNS Salam has a maximum speed of 35 knots (65 km/h; 40 mph). She has a range of 800 nautical miles (1,500 km; 920 mi) at 30 knots (56 km/h; 35 mph).

The ship's armament consists of one 40 mm AA gun and twin 30 mm AA guns. She is equipped with one Type 352 Square Tie radar for surface search.

== Service ==
The ship was commissioned into the Bangladesh Navy as BNS Durnibar on 10 November 1988. She was severely damaged in the cyclone of April 1991 and sunk into Karnaphuli river. Later, she was salvaged, renovated and modified into a gunboat. In 2002, she was recommissioned into the Bangladesh Navy as BNS Salam

== See also ==
- Fast attack craft
- List of active ships of the Bangladesh Navy
