= HMS Redpole (P259) =

British military recovery and support craft

History

Royal Air Force
- Name: Sea Otter
- Operator: Royal Air Force Marine Branch
- Ordered: 26 March 1973
- Builder: Fairmile, Berwick-upon-Tweed
- Laid down: 29 July 1974
- Launched: 20 September 1974
- Commissioned: 25 March 1975
- Out of service: 1985
- Identification: IMO number: 8654314
- Fate: Transferred to Royal Navy

Royal Navy
- Name: HMS Redpole
- Namesake: Redpoll
- In service: 1985
- Out of service: 1994
- Identification: IMO number: 8654314
- Fate: Sold in 2000 and renamed MV Badtz Maru

General characteristics
- Class & type: Bird-class patrol vessel
- Displacement: 159 long tons (162 t)
- Length: 120 ft (37 m) o/a
- Beam: 23 ft (7.0 m)
- Draught: 6.5 ft (2.0 m)
- Propulsion: Two diesel engines, one to each shaft, all giving 4,000 brake horsepower (3,000 kW)
- Speed: 21 knots (39 km/h; 24 mph)
- Range: 2,200 nautical miles (4,100 km; 2,500 mi) at 12 knots (22 km/h; 14 mph)
- Complement: 17

HMS Redpole (P259) was built in 1974 by Fairmile Marine at Berwick-upon-Tweed as RAFV Sea Otter, the third Seal class Long Range Recovery and Support Craft of the Royal Air Force Marine Branch. The Seal class was similar to the Bird-class patrol vessels of the British Royal Navy.

== Royal Naval service ==
In anticipation of the disbandment of the RAF Marine Branch in 1986, Sea Otter was transferred to the Royal Navy on 30 October 1984. At Brooke Marine, Lowestoft, she was refitted - given armaments, a light grey livery, an enclosed wheelhouse and extended bridge wings, and modified several times over the years to help her in her role patrolling Northern Ireland.

== Post-UK service ==
As part of the cuts in the defence budget, Redpole was replaced in 1994 by a River-class minesweeper and was subsequently earmarked for disposal.

The ship was sold in 1996 and spent four years in Southampton. The ship was sold again in 2000 to a founder of Digex, renamed RV Badtz Maru (after Bad Badtz-Maru), and moved to Baltimore, Maryland.

Since 2012, as Seaman Guard Virginia, she has participated in anti-piracy patrols conducted by maritime private military contractor AdvanFort in the Gulf of Aden.
