= BNS Padma =

Two ships of Bangladesh Navy carried the name BNS Padma:

- BNS Padma (1973), an Ajay-class patrol vessel gifted by Indian Navy.
- BNS Padma (2013), a Padma-class patrol vessel currently in service.
