= BNS Bishkhali (2024) =

Bangladesh Navy offshore patrol vessel

History

Bangladesh
- Name: BNS Bishkhali
- Ordered: 20 May 2019
- Builder: Khulna Shipyard
- Laid down: 2 December 2019
- Commissioned: 30 November 2024
- Identification: Pennant number: P 415
- Status: In active service

General characteristics
- Class & type: Padma-class inshore patrol vessel
- Displacement: 350 tonnes
- Length: 51.6 m (169 ft 3 in)
- Beam: 7.5 m (24 ft 7 in)
- Draught: 4.2 m (13 ft 9 in)
- Propulsion: 2 shafts, 2 diesels
- Speed: 21 kn (39 km/h; 24 mph)
- Endurance: 7 days
- Boats & landing craft carried: 1 x RIB boat
- Complement: 45 personnel
- Armament: 1 × Bofors 40 mm L/60 cannon; 2 × 12.7 mm CIS 50MG; Naval mines

BNS Bishkhali is a Padma-class inshore patrol vessel of the Bangladesh Navy. She has served the Bangladesh Navy since 2024.

== Career ==
The ship was ordered on 20 May 2019. The contract was awarded to Khulna Shipyard in Khulna, Bangladesh, where the keel was laid on 2 December 2019. The Ship was commissioned to the Bangladesh Navy on 30 November 2024.

== Design ==
BNS Bishkhali is 51.6 metres (169 ft 3 in) long, 7.5 metres (24 ft 7 in) wide, 4.2 metres (13 ft 9 in) high. The patrol vessel has a displacement of 350 tonnes. She has a top speed of 21 knots (39 km/h; 24 mph). The ship's complement is 45 persons and can carry out missions lasting up to seven days at a time.

== Armament ==
The ship is equipped with one Bofors 40 mm L/60 cannon and a pair of 12.7 mm CIS 50MGs. Bishkhali can also carry naval mines and MANPADS.

== See also ==
- List of active ships of the Bangladesh Navy
