= Bird-class patrol vessel =

1975 class of British patrol vessels

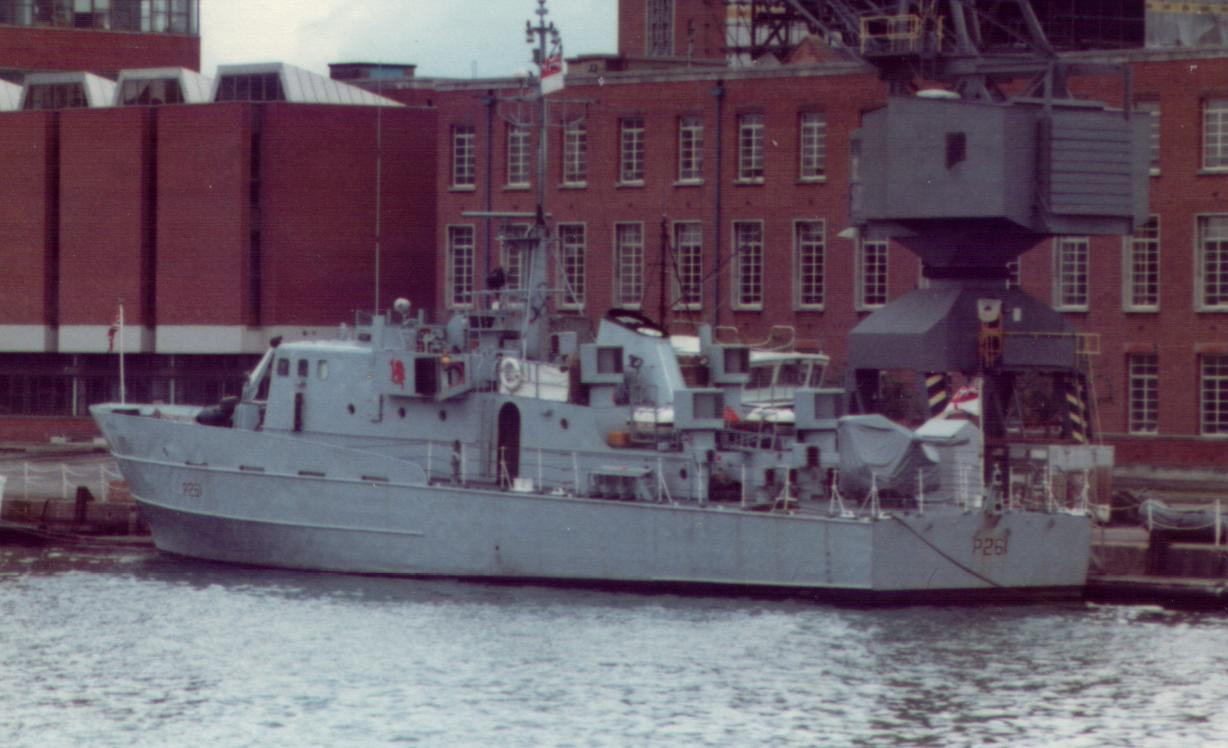
- HMS Cygnet

Class overview
- Builders: Richard Dunston
- Operators: Royal Navy
- Planned: 5
- Completed: 5
- Retired: 5

General characteristics
- Type: Patrol vessel
- Displacement: 194 tonnes
- Length: 37.7 m (123 ft 8 in)
- Beam: 7.2 m (23 ft 7 in)
- Draught: 2 m (6 ft 7 in)
- Propulsion: 2 × Paxman 16YJCM diesel engines driving through ZF marine gearboxes
- Speed: 21 knots (39 km/h; 24 mph) max.; 16 knots (30 km/h; 18 mph) continuous; 25 knots (46 km/h; 29 mph) reported on trials
- Range: 2,000 nmi (3,700 km; 2,300 mi)
- Complement: 4 officers, 19 ratings
- Armament: 1 × 40 mm Bofors gun (mounted aft); 2 × GPMGs
- Armour: Welded steel hull with aluminium superstructure
- Notes: Also fitted with 2 × Gemini boats

The Bird-class patrol vessel was a class of large patrol boat built for the Royal Navy. There were five in total: Kingfisher, Cygnet, Peterel, Sandpiper and Redpole.

The class was designed for patrol and fishery protection tasks in coastal and inshore territorial waters. The first of the class were delivered some 18 months late, and the rest approximately two years late.

The first four vessels of the class were ordered in late 1972 and commissioned between 1975 and 1977, with the final ship being commissioned in 1983 after a conversion by Fairmile Marine. They were built by Richard Dunston for £1.1m each, and were designed for service in the Inshore Division of the Fishery Protection Squadron. The class was closely related to the Royal Air Force Marine Branch Seal class long-range recovery boats.

The vessels had poor seakeeping qualities and the design was therefore considered unsuccessful. As a result, Peterel and Sandpiper were employed as training tenders for the Royal Naval Reserve and never undertook an operational patrol. After a decision was made on their future, they were fitted with an enclosed bridge and assigned to Britannia Royal Naval College for training duties. Kingfisher, Redpole and Cygnet were assigned to Northern Ireland Squadron to replace the older Ton-class minesweepers.

The vessels are now privately owned, Cygnet in the UK, Redpole in the US and Sandpiper in the Netherlands.
