= HMS Kingfisher (P260) =

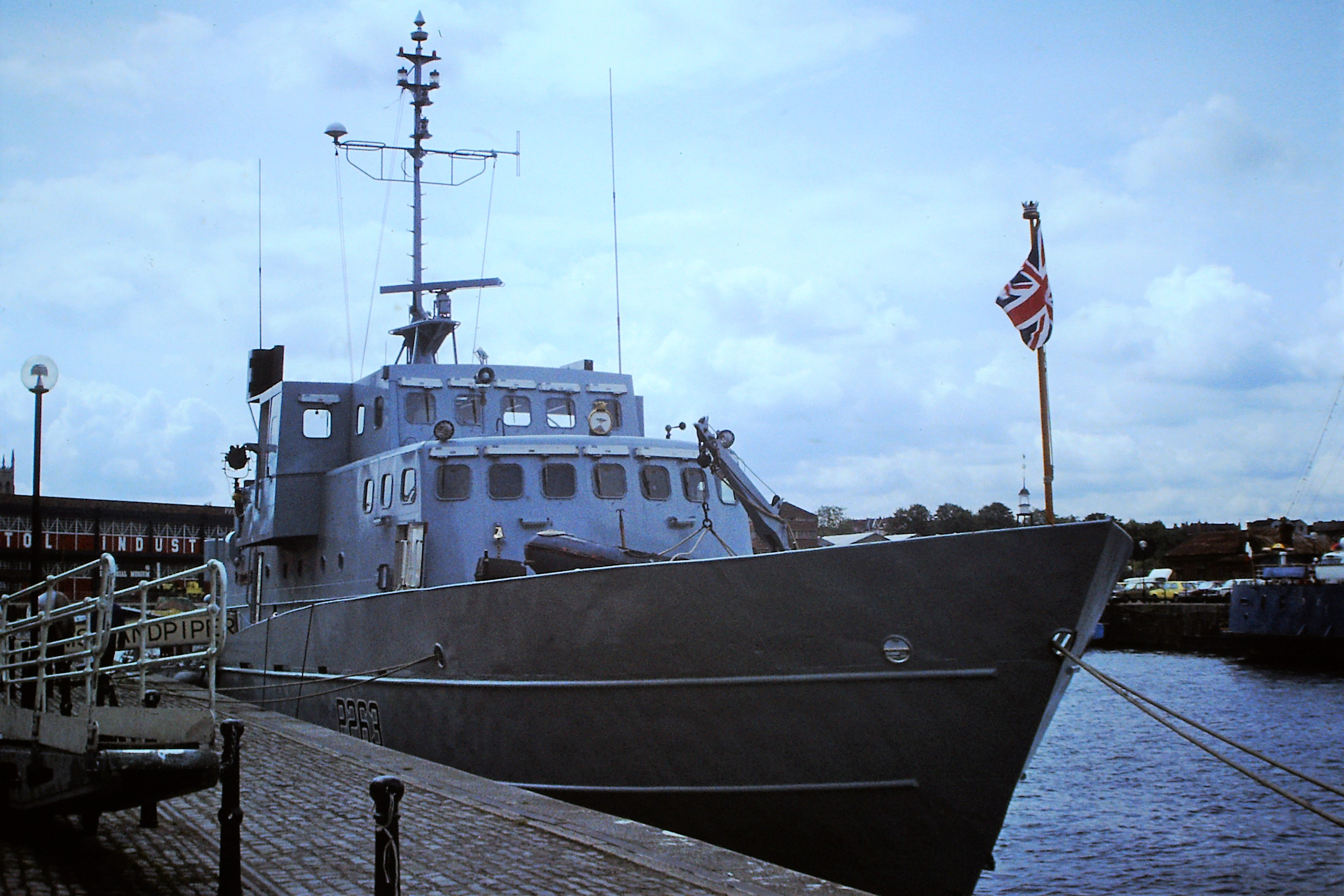
- Another Bird-class patrol vessel, HMS Sandpiper

History

United Kingdom
- Name: HMS Kingfisher
- Builder: Richard Dunston, Hessle
- Laid down: July 1973
- Launched: 20 September 1974
- Commissioned: 8 October 1975
- Fate: Sold 28 February 1996

General characteristics
- Class & type: Bird-class patrol vessel
- Displacement: 190 long tons (193 t)
- Length: 120 ft (37 m) o/a
- Beam: 23 ft (7.0 m)
- Complement: 4 officers, 19 ratings
- Armament: 1 × 40mm Bofors gun (mounted aft); 2 × GPMGs

HMS Kingfisher (P260) was a Bird-class patrol vessel of the British Royal Navy.

== Construction and design ==
Kingfisher was laid down at the Richard Dunston shipyard at Hessle, near Kingston upon Hull in July 1973, was launched on 20 September 1974 and commissioned on 8 October 1975.

== Service ==
In 1978, Kingfisher and sister ship Cygnet were deployed on Operation Grenada, the Royal Navy's standing patrol off the coast of Northern Ireland to stop arms smuggling to paramilitary groups during the Troubles. Kingfisher continued her patrol duties as part of the Northern Ireland Squadron through the 1980s and into the 1990s.
