= BNS Jamuna =

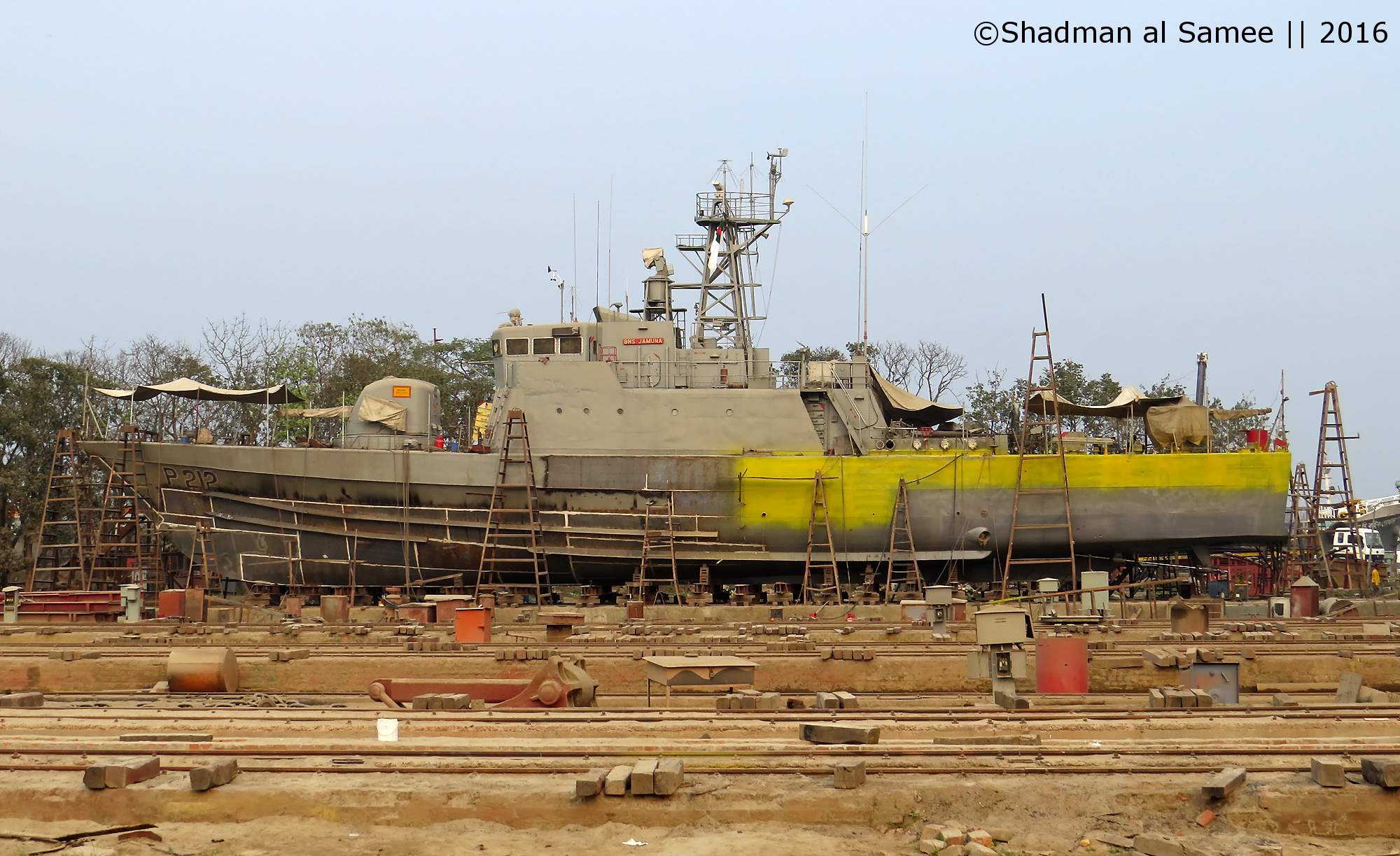
- BNS Jamuna during undergoing refits at Khulna Shipyard in 2016.

History

Bangladesh
- Name: Jamuna
- Builder: Vosper Thorneycroft Uniteers (VTU), Tanjong Rhu, Singapore
- Launched: 19 March 1984
- Home port: Chattogram
- Status: In service

General characteristics
- Class & type: Meghna class inshore patrol vessel
- Displacement: 410 full load tons (full load)
- Length: 46.5m (152.5ft)
- Beam: 7.5m (24.6ft)
- Draught: 2m (6.6ft)
- Propulsion: 2 Paxman valenta 12CM diesels; 5,000 hp(3.73 MW)sustained; 2 shafts
- Speed: 20 knots
- Range: 2,000 miles at 16 kt
- Complement: 39
- Sensors & processing systems: Surface search: Decca 1229; I-band.
- Electronic warfare & decoys: Selenia NA 18 B optronic system for weapon control.
- Armament: 1 x 57mm 70-cal Bofors DP gun; 1 x 40mm 70-cal Bofors AA gun; 2 x 7.62mm MG

BNS Jamuna is a Meghna Class Patrol Vessel of the Bangladesh Navy that joined in 1985.

== Career ==
BNS Jamuna is serving under the command of the Commodore Commanding BN Flotilla (COMBAN).

== Armament ==
The ship is armed with a 57mm 70-cal Bofors DP gun that can fire 200 rds/min to 17 km (9.3 n miles) carrying 2.4 kg. shell and a 40mm 70-cal Bofors AA gun firing 300rds/min to 12 km (6.5 n miles) with 0.96 kg.shell. Besides there are two 7.62mm machine guns as secondary weapons.

== See also ==
- BNS Meghna
- List of active ships of the Bangladesh Navy

== Bibliography ==
- Saunders, Stephen, ed. (2004). Jane's Fighting Ships 2004–2005. Coulsdon, UK: Jane's Information Group. ISBN 0-7106-2623-1.
