= BNS Shaikat =

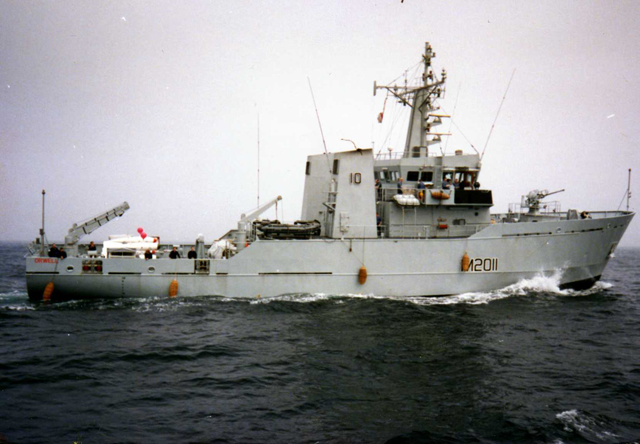

History

Bangladesh
- Name: Shaikat
- Launched: 23 September 1983
- Commissioned: 27 April 1995
- Status: In active service

History

UK
- Name: Carron
- Builder: Richards Dry Dock and Engineering Limited
- Commissioned: 30 September 1984
- Out of service: 1993
- Fate: Sold in 1995

General characteristics
- Class & type: River-class minesweeper
- Displacement: 850 long tons (864 t) standard; 890 long tons (904 t) full
- Length: 47 m (154 ft 2 in)
- Beam: 10.5 m (34 ft 5 in)
- Draught: 3.1 m (10 ft 2 in)
- Propulsion: 2 shafts, Ruston 6RKC diesels, 3,040 bhp (2,267 kW)
- Speed: 14 knots (16 mph; 26 km/h)
- Complement: 5 officers and 23 ratings; (accommodation for 36: 7 officers and 29 ratings)
- Armament: 1 × Bofors 40 mm Mark III gun; 2 × 7.62 mm L44A1 GPMGs
- Notes: Pennant number: M 96

BNS Shaikat, formerly HMS Carron, is a River class minesweeper of the Bangladeshi Navy. She is serving Bangladeshi Navy from 1995.

== History ==
This ship served in the Royal Navy as HMS Carron (M2004). She was commissioned on 30 September 1984. She was assigned to the Severn Division of the Royal Naval Reserve. She was withdrawn from service in 1993. In 1995, she was sold to Bangladesh.

== Career ==
Shaikat was commissioned in Bangladesh Navy on 27 April 1995. She is currently being used as a patrol ship.

== Armament ==
The ship carries one Bofors 40 mm Mark III gun which can be used in both anti-surface and anti-air role. She also carries two L44A1 7.62 mm general purpose machine guns.

== See also ==
- List of active ships of the Bangladesh Navy
- BNS Shapla
- BNS Surovi
- BNS Shaibal

== Bibliography ==
- Saunders, Stephen, ed. (2004). Jane's Fighting Ships 2004–2005. Coulsdon, UK: Jane's Information Group. ISBN 0-7106-2623-1.
