= BNS Surovi =

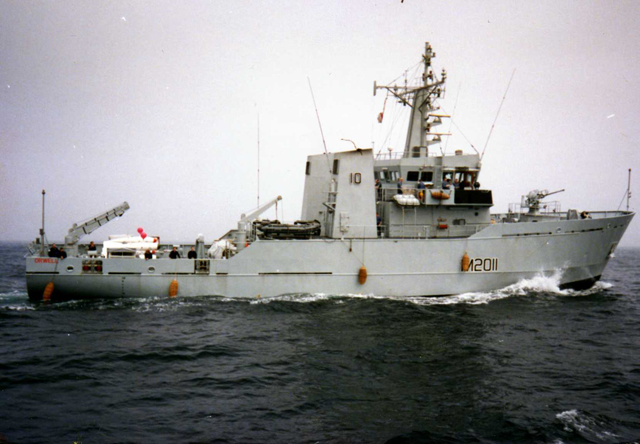

History

Bangladesh
- Name: Surovi
- Builder: Richards Dry Dock and Engineering Limited
- Launched: 07 December 1983
- Commissioned: 27 April 1995
- Status: In active service

General characteristics
- Class & type: River-class minesweeper
- Displacement: 850 long tons (864 t) standard; 890 long tons (904 t) full
- Length: 47.7 m (156 ft 6 in)
- Beam: 10.5 m (34 ft 5 in)
- Draught: 3.4 m (11 ft 2 in)
- Propulsion: 2 shafts, Ruston 6RKC diesels, 3,040 bhp (2,267 kW)
- Speed: 14 knots (26 km/h; 16 mph)
- Complement: 5 officers and 23 ratings; (accommodation for 36: 7 officers and 29 ratings)
- Armament: 1 × Bofors 40 mm Mark III gun; 2 × 7.62 mm L44A1 GPMGs
- Notes: Pennant number: M 97

BNS Surovi is a River-class minesweeper of the Bangladeshi Navy, commissioned in 1995.

== History ==
This ship served in Royal Navy as HMS Dovey (M2005). She was commissioned on 30 March 1985. She was assigned to the Clyde Division of Royal Naval Reserve. She was withdrawn from service in 1993. In 1995, she was sold to Bangladesh.

BNS Surovi was commissioned in Bangladesh Navy on 27 April 1995. She is currently being used as a patrol ship.

== Armament ==
The ship carries one Bofors 40 mm Mark III gun which can be used in both anti-surface and anti-air role. She also carries two L44A1 7.62 mm general purpose machine guns.

== See also ==
- List of active ships of the Bangladesh Navy
- BNS Shapla
- BNS Shaikat
- BNS Shaibal

== Bibliography ==
- Saunders, Stephen, ed. (2004). Jane's Fighting Ships 2004–2005. Coulsdon, UK: Jane's Information Group. ISBN 0-7106-2623-1.
