= BNS Sagar =

History

Bangladesh
- Name: BNS Sagar
- Commissioned: 27 April 1995
- Status: In active service

General characteristics
- Class & type: Type 010 minesweeper
- Displacement: 520 tonnes (standard); 590 tonnes (full load)
- Length: 196 ft 8 in (59.94 m)
- Beam: 27 ft 6 in (8.38 m)
- Draught: 6 ft 9 in (2.06 m)
- Propulsion: 2 × PCR/Kolomna Type 9-D-8 diesels; 2,000 hp (1,491 kW); 2 shafts
- Speed: 14 knots (26 km/h; 16 mph)
- Range: 3,000 nmi (5,600 km) at 10 kn (19 km/h)
- Complement: 70 (10 officers)
- Sensors & processing systems: Type 756 I-Band Surface Search radar; Sonar: Celcius Tech CMAS 36/39 active high frequency mine detection sonar
- Armament: 2 × Type 76 twin 37 mm naval gun; 2 × Type 61 25mm AAA guns; 2 × twin 14.5 machine guns; 2 × BMB-2 projectors with 20 depth charges; 12-16 mines
- Notes: Pennant Number: M 91

BNS Sagar is a Type 010 minesweeper of the Bangladeshi Navy. She has served in the Bangladeshi Navy since 1995.

== Career ==
Bangladesh government ordered it from China in 1993. First of class handed over 18 December 1994. BNS Sagar was commissioned in the Bangladesh Navy on 27 April 1995. She is currently being used as a patrol ship.

She went through an upgrade program in 1998 in which her Tamir II hull mounted active search and attack sonar was replaced by Celsius Tech CMAS36/29 mine detection sonar.

BNS Sagar took part in the rescue operation of the sunken fishing vessel FV Bandhan in Chittagong on 28 November 2014.

== Armament ==
The ship carries two Type 76 twin 37 mm naval guns of 63 cal. which can be used in both anti-surface and anti-air role. She also carries two Type 61 25mm AAA guns which can fire at a rate of 70-300rpm with a 2.3 km range. Two twin 14.5 machine guns are also carried. For the anti-submarine role, she carries two BMB-2 projectors with 20 depth charges. She can also carry 12-16 mines.

== See also ==
- List of active ships of the Bangladesh Navy
