= BNS Shaibal =

History

Bangladesh
- Name: Shaibal
- Builder: Richards Dry Dock and Engineering Limited
- Launched: 16 May 1984
- Commissioned: 27 April 1995
- Status: In active service

General characteristics
- Displacement: 850 long tons (864 t) standard; 890 long tons (904 t) full
- Length: 47 m (154 ft 2 in)
- Beam: 10.5 m (34 ft 5 in)
- Draught: 3.1 m (10 ft 2 in)
- Propulsion: 2 shafts, Ruston 6RKC diesels, 3,040 bhp (2,267 kW)
- Speed: 14 knots (26 km/h; 16 mph)
- Complement: 5 officers and 23 ratings; (accommodation for 36: 7 officers and 29 ratings)
- Armament: 1 × Bofors 40 mm Mark III gun; 2 × 7.62 mm L44A1 GPMGs
- Notes: Pennant number: M 98

BNS Shaibal, formerly HMS Helford, is a River-class minesweeper of the Bangladeshi Navy. She is serving Bangladeshi Navy from 1995.

== History ==
This ship served in Royal Navy as HMS Helford (M2006). She was commissioned on 7 June 1985. She was assigned to the Northern Ireland Division of Royal Naval Reserve. She was withdrawn from service in 1993. In 1995, she was sold to Bangladesh.

== Career ==
BNS Shaibal was commissioned in Bangladesh Navy on 27 April 1995. She is currently being used as a patrol ship.

In March 1997, she was equipped with hydro-graphic survey equipments to serve as a survey vessel although mine countermeasure capability was retained.

== Armament ==
The ship carries one Bofors 40 mm Mark III gun which can be used in both anti-surface and anti-air role. She also carries two L44A1 7.62 mm general purpose machine guns.

== See also ==
- List of active ships of the Bangladesh Navy
- BNS Shapla
- BNS Shaikat
- BNS Surovi

== Bibliography ==
- Saunders, Stephen, ed. (2004). Jane's Fighting Ships 2004–2005. Coulsdon, UK: Jane's Information Group. ISBN 0-7106-2623-1.
