= BNS Tallashi =

Hydrographic survey ship of the Bangladesh Navy

History

Bangladesh
- Name: BNS Tallashi
- Builder: Khulna Shipyard Limited
- Launched: 2 September 2019
- Commissioned: 5 November 2020
- Home port: Chittagong
- Identification: Pennant number: H582
- Status: In active service

General characteristics
- Length: 32.78 metres (107.5 ft)
- Beam: 8.40 metres (27.6 ft)
- Draft: 3.17 metres (10.4 ft)
- Propulsion: 2 x 600hp diesel engines
- Speed: 12 knots (22 km/h; 14 mph)

BNS Tallashi is a hydrographic survey ship of the Bangladesh Navy. She was commissioned on 5 November 2020.

== See also ==
- BNS Darshak
- Khulna Shipyard Limited
- List of active ships of the Bangladesh Navy
