= BNS Barkat =

Bangladeshi submarine chaser

History

Bangladesh
- Name: Barkat
- Commissioned: 9 April 1996
- Home port: Chittagong
- Status: In active service

General characteristics
- Class & type: Haizhui-class submarine chaser
- Displacement: 170 tonnes
- Length: 41 m (135 ft)
- Beam: 5.3 m (17 ft)
- Draft: 1.8 m (5.9 ft)
- Propulsion: 2 × Chinese L-12V-180A diesel engines, 4,400 hp (3,281 kW); 4 × shafts
- Speed: 25 knots (46 km/h; 29 mph)
- Range: 750 mi (1,210 km) at 17 knots (31 km/h; 20 mph)
- Complement: 43
- Sensors & processing systems: 1 × Pot Head surface search radar; 1 × high frequency hull mounted active sonar
- Armament: 2 × twin 37 mm (1.5 in) guns; 2 × twin 25 mm (1 in) AA guns
- Notes: Pennant number: P 711

BNS Barkat is a Haizhui-class submarine chaser of Bangladesh Navy. She was commissioned in the Bangladeshi Navy in 1996.

== Career ==
BNS Barkat was commissioned in Bangladesh Navy on 9 April 1996. She is currently based at Chittagong.

== Electronics ==
The ship uses a Pot Head radar as primary electronics and for surface search purpose. This radar is effective in performing mine laying operations also. For ASW operations, she uses a high frequency hull mounted active sonar.

== Armament ==
The ship is armed with two twin-gun mounts for the Type 76A 37 mm (1.5 in) dual-purpose gun and another pair of twin-gun mounts for the Type 61 25 mm (1 in) anti-aircraft gun.

== See also ==
- List of active ships of the Bangladesh Navy

== Bibliography ==
- Saunders, Stephen, ed. (2004). Jane's Fighting Ships 2004–2005. Coulsdon, UK: Jane's Information Group. ISBN 0-7106-2623-1.
