= BNT Shibsha =

History

Bangladesh
- Name: Shibsha
- Ordered: 1999
- Builder: Khulna Shipyard
- Commissioned: 3 October 2004
- Status: In active service

General characteristics
- Class & type: Damen Stan Tug 3008
- Displacement: 330 tons (full load)
- Length: 30 m (98 ft)
- Beam: 8.4 m (28 ft)
- Draught: 3.5 m (11 ft)
- Propulsion: 2 Caterpillar 12V 3512B diesel engine 2700; 2 shafts
- Speed: 12 knots (22 km/h; 14 mph)
- Range: 1,800 nmi (3,300 km; 2,100 mi) at 12 knots
- Complement: 23
- Notes: Pennant number: A 724

BNT Shibsha is a Damen Stan Tug 3008 class Fleet Coastal Tug of the Bangladeshi Navy. She was commissioned to Bangladeshi Navy on 3 October 2004.

== Design ==
BNT Shibsha is a medium harbor tug. Built at Khulna Shipyard with Dutch technical assistance, she incorporate many equipment and materials of South Korean origin. She is 30 m (98 ft) in length, 8.4 m (28 ft) in breadth and has a drought of 3.5 m (11 ft). She has a top speed of 12 knots (22 km/h; 14 mph) and a range of 1,800 nautical miles (3,300 km; 2,100 mi) with 330 tons full load.

== See also ==
- List of active ships of the Bangladesh Navy
- BNT Rupsha

== Bibliography ==
- Saunders, Stephen, ed. (2004). Jane's Fighting Ships 2004–2005. Coulsdon, UK: Jane's Information Group. ISBN 0-7106-2623-1.
