= BNS Sahayak =

Fleet Replenishment Ship of the Bangladesh Navy

History

Bangladesh
- Name: BNS Sahayak
- Commissioned: 23 November 1978
- Status: In service

General characteristics
- Class & type: Auxiliary
- Displacement: 485 t (480 long tons; 530 short tons)
- Length: 44.7 m (147 ft)
- Beam: 8 m (26 ft)
- Draught: 2 m (6.6 ft)
- Propulsion: 1 × Cummins 12 VTS 6 diesel producing 317 kW (425 shp), driving 1 shaft
- Speed: 21.3 km/h (11.5 kn)
- Range: 7,000 km (3,800 nmi) at 21.3 km/h (11.5 kn)
- Complement: 45
- Armament: 1 × 20 mm Oerlikon guns

BNS Sahayak (Bengali: সহায়ক—"Helpful") is a repair ship of the Bangladesh Navy. She was competed in 1978 at Khulna Shipyard.

== Career ==
Forty-five personnel serve aboard Sahayak.

== See also ==
- List of active ships of the Bangladesh Navy
