= Type 837 tug =

Chinese tug ship

The Type 837 tug with the NATO reporting name Hujiu (沪救, meaning Shanghai Rescue in Chinese) is a type of ocean-going tug that China developed for the People's Liberation Army Navy (PLAN). Out of a total of 20 ships built in the 1980s by the Wuhu shipyard, 18 are still in PLAN service and all of them still remain active as of the early 2010s. One ship was exported to Bangladesh in 1984, and another was sold in 1995.

The ships in the type 837 series in PLAN service are labeled with a combination of two Chinese characters followed by a three-digit number. The second Chinese character is Tuo (拖), meaning tug in Chinese, because these ships are tugs. The first Chinese character denotes which fleet the ship is in service with; for example, with East (Dong, 东) for East Sea Fleet, North (Bei, 北) for North Sea Fleet, and South (Nan, 南) for South Sea Fleet. However, the pennant numbers may have changed due to the change of Chinese naval ships naming convention. Specification:

- Length (m): 60.2
- Beam (m): 11.6
- Draft (m): 4.4
- Displacement (t): 1470
- Speed (kn): 15
- Rang (nmi): 2200 @ 13 kn
- Crew: 50
- Propulsion: two LVP diesel engines @ 1800 hp
- Armament: Provisions for heavy machine guns

Type	Pennant #	Status	Fleet
837	Dong-Tuo 836	Active	East Sea Fleet
837	Dong-Tuo 837	Active	East Sea Fleet
837	Dong-Tuo 842	Active	East Sea Fleet
837	Dong-Tuo 843	Active	East Sea Fleet
837	Dong-Tuo 875	Active	East Sea Fleet
837	Dong-Tuo 877	Active	East Sea Fleet
837	Bei-Tuo 622	Active	North Sea Fleet
837	Bei-Tuo 635	Active	North Sea Fleet
837	Bei-Tuo 711	Active	North Sea Fleet
837	Bei-Tuo 712	Active	North Sea Fleet
837	Bei-Tuo 717	Active	North Sea Fleet
837	Nan-Tuo 147	Active	South Sea Fleet
837	Nan-Tuo 155	Active	South Sea Fleet
837	Nan-Tuo 156	Active	South Sea Fleet
837	Nan-Tuo 164	Active	South Sea Fleet
837	Nan-Tuo 174	Active	South Sea Fleet
837	Nan-Tuo 175	Active	South Sea Fleet
837	Nan-Tuo 185	Active	South Sea Fleet
