= BNS Padma (2012) =

Offshore patrol vessel of the Bangladesh Navy

History

Bangladesh
- Name: BNS Padma
- Ordered: 2 May 2010
- Builder: Khulna Shipyard
- Laid down: 5 March 2011
- Launched: 8 October 2012
- Commissioned: 24 January 2013
- Home port: Khulna
- Identification: Pennant number: P 312
- Status: In Active Service

General characteristics
- Class & type: Padma-class offshore patrol vessel
- Displacement: 350 tonnes
- Length: 50.4 metres (165 ft)
- Beam: 7.5 metres (25 ft)
- Draught: 4.1 metres (13 ft)
- Propulsion: 2 shafts, 2 diesels
- Speed: 23 knots (43 km/h)
- Endurance: 7 days
- Boats & landing craft carried: 1 x RIB boat
- Complement: 45 personnel
- Armament: 2 × 37mm canon; 2 × 20mm AA guns; Naval Mines

BNS Padma is a Padma-class offshore patrol vessel of the Bangladesh Navy. She has been serving the Bangladesh Navy since 2013.

== Career ==
The ship was ordered on 2 May 2010. The contract was awarded to Khulna Shipyard in Khulna, Bangladesh, where the keel was laid in 2011. It was built in collaboration with Hudong Shipyard, with the Chinese supplying designs and materials and supervising the construction. She cost 580 million Bangladeshi taka (equivalent to $7.1 million in 2012). The ship was launched on 8 October 2012, and commissioned on 24 January 2013. She is currently serving under the command of Commander Flotilla West (COMFLOT WEST).

== Design ==
BNS Padma is 50.4 metres (165 ft) long, 7.5 metres (25 ft) wide and 4.1 metres (13 ft) high. The vessel has a displacement of 350 tonnes. She has a top speed of 23 knots (43 km/h). Her complement is 45 persons and she can carry out missions lasting up to seven days at a time.

=== Armament ===
The ship is equipped with a pair of 20 mm anti-aircraft guns and a pair of 37 mm guns. Padma can also carry naval mines and MANPADS.

== See also ==
- List of active ships of the Bangladesh Navy
