= BNS Aparajeya =

History

Bangladesh
- Name: BNS Aparajeya
- Ordered: 2 May 2010
- Builder: Khulna Shipyard
- Laid down: 5 March 2011
- Acquired: 15 December 2013
- Commissioned: 23 December 2013
- Home port: RRB, Patenga, Chattogram
- Identification: Pennant number: P 261
- Status: In Active Service

General characteristics
- Class & type: Padma-class offshore patrol vessel
- Displacement: 350 tonnes
- Length: 50.4 metres (165 ft)
- Beam: 7.5 metres (25 ft)
- Draught: 4.1 metres (13 ft)
- Propulsion: 4 shafts, 2 diesels
- Speed: 23 knots (43 km/h)
- Endurance: 7 days
- Boats & landing craft carried: 1 x RIB boat
- Complement: 45 personnel
- Armament: 2 × 37mm canon; 2 × 20mm AA guns; Naval Mines

BNS Aparajeya is a Padma-class offshore patrol vessel of the Bangladesh Navy. She has been serving the Bangladesh Navy since 2013.

== Career ==
The ship was ordered on 2 May 2010. The contract was awarded to Khulna Shipyard in Khulna, Bangladesh, where the keel was laid in 2011. The ship was launched on 23 June 2013 and commissioned on 23 December 2013. She currently serves under the command of Commander Bangladesh Navy Flotilla (COMBAN)'at Chittagong'.

== Design ==
BNS Aparajeya is 50.4 metres (165 ft) long, 7.5 metres (25 ft) wide, 4.1 metres (13 ft) high. It has a displacement of 350 tonnes and a top speed of 23 knots (43 km/h). Its complement is 45 persons and she can carry out missions lasting up to seven days at a time.

== Armament ==
The ship is equipped with a pair of 20 mm anti-aircraft guns and a pair of 37 mm guns. It can also be armed with naval mines and MANPADS.

== See also ==
- List of active ships of the Bangladesh Navy
