= BNS Shapla =

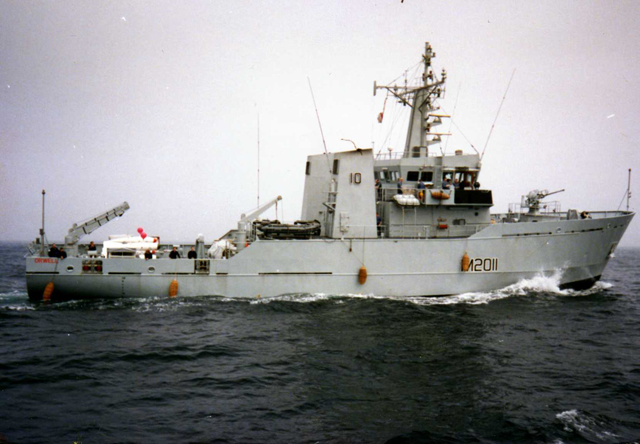

History

Bangladesh
- Name: Shapla
- Builder: Richards Dry Dock and Engineering Limited
- Launched: 8 September 1983
- Commissioned: 27 April 1995
- Status: In active service

General characteristics
- Class & type: River-class minesweeper
- Displacement: 850 long tons (864 t) standard; 890 long tons (904 t) full
- Length: 47 m (154 ft 2 in)
- Beam: 10.5 m (34 ft 5 in)
- Draught: 3.1 m (10 ft 2 in)
- Propulsion: 2 shafts, Ruston 6RKC diesels, 3,040 bhp (2,267 kW)
- Speed: 14 knots (16 mph; 26 km/h)
- Complement: 5 officers and 23 ratings; (accommodation for 36: 7 officers and 29 ratings)
- Armament: 1 × Bofors 40 mm Mark III gun; 2 × 7.62 mm L44A1 GPMGs
- Notes: Pennant number: M 95

BNS Shapla is a River class minesweeper of the Bangladeshi Navy. Formerly the Royal Navy fleet minesweeper HMS Waveney (M2003). She is serving Bangladeshi Navy from 1995.

== History ==
Waveney (M2003) built by Richards Dry Dock and Engineering was commissioned into the Royal Navy on 12 July 1984. She was assigned to the South Wales Division of Royal Naval Reserve. She was later withdrawn from service in 1993 and sold in 1995 to Bangladesh.

Shapla was commissioned into the Bangladesh Navy on 27 April 1995. She is currently being used as a patrol ship

== Armament ==
The ship carries one Bofors 40 mm Mark III gun which can be used in both anti-surface and anti-air role. She also carries two L44A1 7.62 mm general purpose machine guns.

== See also ==
- List of active ships of the Bangladesh Navy
- BNS Shaikat
- BNS Surovi
- BNS Shaibal

== Bibliography ==
- Saunders, Stephen, ed. (2004). Jane's Fighting Ships 2004–2005. Coulsdon, UK: Jane's Information Group. ISBN 0-7106-2623-1.
