= Type 54 =

Type 54 may refer to:

- Type 54 pistol, a Chinese pistol
- Type 54 submachine gun, the Chinese copy of the Soviet PPS-43
- Type 54 heavy machine gun, a Chinese heavy machine gun, a copy of the Soviet DShK
- Type 54 (PL-54) 152 mm towed howitzer, Copy of the Soviet D-1 howitzer
- Type 54-1 (PL-54-1) 122 mm towed howitzer. Copy of the Soviet M-30 howitzer
- Type 054 frigate, a class of frigate
- Gal-class submarine, also known as the Type 540
