= BNS Meghna =

Patrol vessel of the Bangladesh Navy

History

Bangladesh
- Name: BNS Meghna
- Builder: Vosper Thorneycroft Uniteers (VTU), Tanjong Rhu, Singapore
- Launched: 19 January 1984
- Home port: Chattogram
- Status: In service

General characteristics
- Class & type: Meghna class inshore patrol vessel
- Displacement: 410 full load tons (full load)
- Length: 46.5m (152.5ft)
- Beam: 7.5m (24.6ft)
- Draught: 2m (6.6ft)
- Propulsion: 2 Paxman valenta 12CM diesels; 5,000 hp(3.73 MW)sustained; 2 shafts
- Speed: 20 knots
- Range: 2,000 miles at 16 kt
- Complement: 39
- Sensors & processing systems: Surface search: Decca 1229; I-band.
- Electronic warfare & decoys: Selenia NA 18 B optronic system for weapon control.
- Armament: 1 x 57mm 70-cal Bofors DP gun; 1 x 40mm 70-cal Bofors AA gun; 2 x 7.62mm MG
- Notes: Pennant number: P 211

BNS Meghna is a Meghna-class patrol vessel of the Bangladesh Navy that joined in 1985.

== Career ==
BNS Meghna is serving under the command of the Commodore Commanding BN Flotilla (COMBAN).

On 10 September 2018, a fishing trawler named Swadhin-3 sunk near the Mongla port following a collision with a commercial vessel. 12 fishermen were on board the fishing trawler. BNS Turag responded quickly to rescue 9 fishermen alive. Later, BNS Meghna joined the operation along with BNS Nishan to rescue the other three fishermen.

== Armament ==
The ship is armed with a 57mm 70-cal Bofors DP gun that can fire 200 rounds per minute to 17 kilometres (9.2 nmi) carrying 2.4 kg. shell and a 40mm 70-cal Bofors AA gun firing 300 rounds per minute to 12 kilometres (6.5 nmi) with 0.96 kg. shell. Besides that, there are two 7.62mm machine guns as secondary weapons.

== See also ==
- BNS Jamuna
- List of active ships of the Bangladesh Navy
