= BNS Atandra =

History

Bangladesh
- Name: BNS Atondro
- Ordered: 2 May 2010
- Builder: Khulna Shipyard
- Laid down: 5 March 2011
- Acquired: 15 December 2013
- Commissioned: 23 December 2013
- Home port: Khulna
- Identification: Pennant number: P 263
- Status: In Active Service

General characteristics
- Class & type: Padma-class offshore patrol vessel
- Displacement: 350 tonnes
- Length: 50.4 metres (165 ft)
- Beam: 7.5 metres (25 ft)
- Draught: 4.1 metres (13 ft)
- Propulsion: 2 shafts, 2 diesels
- Speed: 23 knots (43 km/h)
- Endurance: 7 days
- Boats & landing craft carried: 1 x RIB boat
- Complement: 45 personnel
- Armament: 2 × 37mm canon; 2 × 20mm AA guns; Naval Mines

BNS Atondro is a Padma-class offshore patrol vessel of the Bangladesh Navy. She is serving the Bangladesh Navy since 2013.

== Career ==
The ship was ordered on 2 May 2010. The contract was awarded to Khulna Shipyard in Khulna, Bangladesh, where the keel was laid in 2012. The ship was launched in 2013 and commissioned on 23 December 2013. She is currently serving under the command of Commanding Commodore BN Khulna (COMKHUL).

In May 2017, a fishing boat containing 11 fishermen sank near Sonadia, Cox's Bazar in the Bay of Bengal due to inclement weather. BNS Atondro rushed there and rescued 9 fishermen and recovered the sunken boat.

== Design ==
BNS Atondro is 50.4 metres (165 ft) long, 7.5 metres (25 ft) wide and 4.1 metres (13 ft) high. The patrol vessel has a displacement of 350 tonnes. She has a top speed of 23 knots (43 km/h). The complement is 45 persons and the ship can carry out missions lasting up to seven days at a time.

== Armament ==
The ship is equipped with a pair of 20 mm anti-aircraft guns and a pair of 37 mm guns. In addition it carries naval mines and MANPADS.

== See also ==
- List of active ships of the Bangladesh Navy
