= Northern Ireland Squadron =

- Active: 1969–1998
- Country: United Kingdom
- Branch: Royal Navy
- Type: Squadron
- Role: Anti-terrorist operations Prevention of illegal arms trade

The Northern Ireland Squadron was a unit of the British Royal Navy. It was established during the conflict in Northern Ireland known as the Troubles to interdict the movement by sea of illegal arms for paramilitaries and to provide other material support for anti-terrorist operations in Northern Ireland. It existed from 1969 to 1998.

== History ==
In 1969 the Royal Navy established the Northern Ireland Squadron which was deployed during The Troubles [1969–1998] to prevent paramilitary organisations moving illegal arms by sea and to support anti-terrorist operations in the province. In 1993 the squadron was moved to HM Naval Base Clyde, aka Faslane Naval Base, Scotland. The squadron's disbandment was announced on 23 March 2005 as part of the process of normalization which follows the 1998 Good Friday Agreement. The last three ships of the squadron, the Hunt-class ships HMS Brecon, HMS Cottesmore, and HMS Dulverton, were decommissioned on 19 July 2005, just a few days before the Provisional Irish Republican Army completed the decommissioning of its weapons and called off its armed campaign.

== Components ==
In 1993, the River-class minesweepers, HMS Blackwater, HMS Spey, HMS Arun, and HMS Itchen were assigned to the Northern Ireland Squadron where they replaced Ton-class minesweepers.

In 1998 the River-class vessels were replaced with Hunt-class mine countermeasures vessel (MCMVs).
