= BNS Anirban =

History

Bangladesh
- Name: BNS Anirban
- Builder: Jiangnan Shipyard, Shanghai
- Commissioned: 1 June 1992
- In service: 1992–present
- Identification: Pennant number: P-8131
- Status: in active service

General characteristics
- Class & type: Type 021-class missile boat
- Displacement: 171 tons standard; 205 tons full load
- Length: 38.6 m (127 ft)
- Beam: 7.6 m (25 ft)
- Draught: 2.7 m (8 ft 10 in)
- Propulsion: 3 × 4,000 hp diesel engines; Three shafts
- Speed: 35 knots (65 km/h; 40 mph)
- Range: 800 nmi (1,500 km; 920 mi) at 30 knots (56 km/h; 35 mph)
- Complement: 28
- Sensors & processing systems: 1 × Type 352 Square Tie
- Armament: 4 × C-704s; 4 × AK-230 (two twin)

BNS Anirban is a Type 021 missile boat of the Bangladesh Navy. She was commissioned in June 1992.

== Design ==
Powered by three 4,000 hp diesel engines that drive three propellers, Anirban has a maximum speed of 35 knots (65 km/h; 40 mph). She has a range of 800 nautical miles (1,500 km; 920 mi) at 30 knots (56 km/h; 35 mph).

The ship's armament consists of four C-704 anti-ship missiles and two AK-230 twin 30 mm guns, mounted on the bow and stern. She is equipped with one Type 352 Square Tie radar for surface search.

== Service ==
Anirban was commissioned into the Bangladesh Navy on 1 June 1992. In 2010, the ship was upgraded with modern C-704 replacing old SY-1 missiles as mid-life upgradation.

== See also ==
- Fast attack craft
