= River-class minesweeper =

Class of British minesweepers

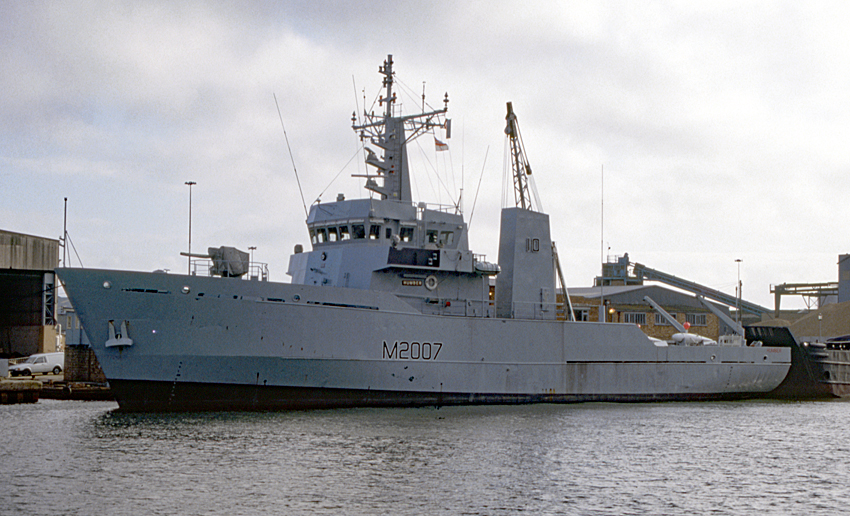
- HMS Humber at South Shields in 1993

Class overview
- Name: River class
- Builders: Richards Dry Dock and Engineering Limited
- Operators: Royal Navy; Brazilian Navy; Bangladesh Navy; Guyana Coast Guard
- Preceded by: Ton class
- Cost: £4.6 million each
- In commission: 1984–2001
- Completed: 12

General characteristics
- Type: Minesweeper
- Displacement: 850 long tons (864 t) standard; 890 long tons (904 t) full
- Length: 47 m (154 ft 2 in)
- Beam: 10.5 m (34 ft 5 in)
- Draught: 3.1 m (10 ft 2 in)
- Propulsion: 2 shafts, Ruston 6RKC diesels, 3,040 bhp (2,267 kW)
- Speed: 14 knots (26 km/h; 16 mph)
- Complement: 5 officers and 23 ratings; (accommodation for 36: 7 officers and 29 ratings)
- Armament: 1 × Bofors 40 mm gun Mark 3; 2 × 7.62 mm L7 GPMGs

The River class was a class of minesweeper built for the British Royal Navy in the 1980s, designated Fleet Minesweepers (MSF). Operated mainly by the Royal Naval Reserve they were taken out of service in 1990s and sold to foreign navies.

== Design ==
The Rivers were built with a traditional steel hull to a design based on a commercial offshore support vessel. The class was designed to be operated as deep sea team sweepers, to combat the threat posed to submarines by Soviet deep-water buoyant moored mines codenamed "Cluster Bay".

The River-class MSF was equipped with the Wire Sweep Mark 9 (WS 9) which was capable of performing Extra Deep Armed Team Sweeping (EDATS). Operating in pairs (or a number of pairs in formation), they towed a sweep between the two ships that followed the profile of the bottom and cut the mooring wires of the mines; these released mines would then be destroyed on the surface with gunfire. The WS 9 was able to be used for "mechanical" sweeping in this manner or "influence" sweeping whereby a transducer was towed through the water generating noise, both acoustic and electro-magnetic, that simulated a larger high value unit. The Rivers were also armed with a single 40 mm Bofors gun on the manually operated World War II-era Mark III mounting, and two L7 GPMGs.

The concept was refined in the chartered trawlers HMS St David and HMS Venturer, and a total of twelve vessels, all named after British rivers, were constructed by Richards (Shipbuilders) Ltd at Lowestoft and Great Yarmouth at an approximate unit cost of £4.6 million. The class was designed to operate in deep water and ocean environments, if necessary, for long periods of time without support. The complement was 5 officers, 7 Senior Ratings, and 16 Junior Ratings, although additional accommodation meant that a total crew of 36 could be borne for training purposes.

== Service history ==
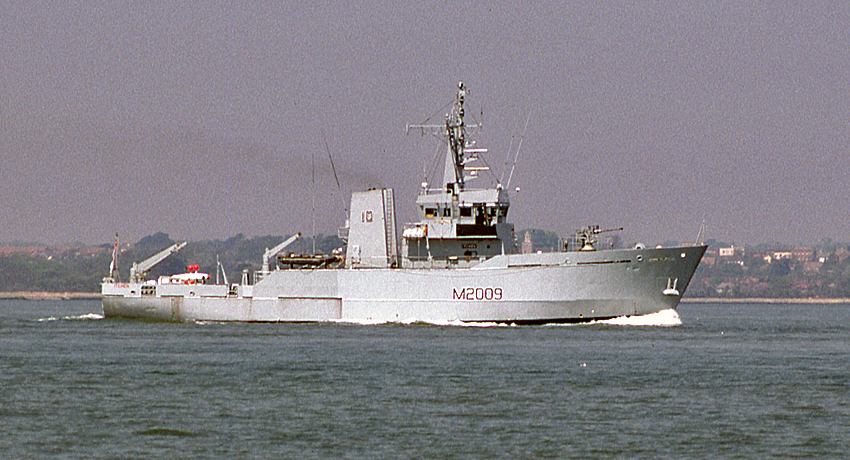
M2009 HMS Itchen in Southampton Water

Upon entering service they joined the 10th Mine Countermeasures Squadron based at Rosyth and eleven were assigned to various Royal Naval Reserve (RNR) divisions around the United Kingdom. The twelfth, Blackwater, entered service with the regular Royal Navy. Following defence cuts, Helmsdale and Ribble were paid off in 1991 and were laid up at Portsmouth. Further cuts followed when the future of the RNR was reviewed in 1993 and as a result the entire class was withdrawn from RNR service.

Blackwater, Spey, Arun and Itchen were subsequently assigned to the Northern Ireland Squadron where they replaced Ton-class vessels patrolling the province's waterways and participating in counter-terrorist operations in support of the British Army and the Royal Ulster Constabulary (RUC). Orwell replaced Wilton, the last Ton-class vessel in service, as the Dartmouth Training Ship in 1994. Ultimately, the entire class was sold to overseas navies.

== Ships ==
Ships
Ship name	Hull number	Built	Commissioned	Decommissioned	Notes
Waveney	M2003	Lowestoft	12 July 1984	3 October 1994	Initially known as Amethyst. Sold to Bangladesh and renamed BNS Shapla; currently active
Carron	M2004	Gt Yarmouth	30 September 1984	3 October 1994	Sold to Bangladesh and renamed BNS Shaikat; currently active
Dovey	M2005	Gt Yarmouth	30 March 1985	3 October 1994	Sold to Bangladesh and renamed BNS Surovi; currently active
Helford	M2006	Gt Yarmouth	7 June 1985	3 October 1994	Sold to Bangladesh and renamed BNS Shaibal; currently active
Humber	M2007	Lowestoft	7 June 1985	21 January 1995	Sold to Brazil and renamed Amorim Do Valle; currently active as a minesweeper
Blackwater	M2008	Gt Yarmouth	5 July 1985	3 October 1994	Sold to Brazil and renamed Benevente; currently active as a patrol corvette
Itchen	M2009	Lowestoft	12 October 1985	April 1998	Sold to Brazil and renamed Jorge Leite, then Bracui; currently active as a patrol corvette
Helmsdale	M2010	Lowestoft	1 March 1986	1995	Sold to Brazil and renamed Garnier Sampaio; currently active as a survey ship
Orwell	M2011	Gt Yarmouth	7 February 1985	2001	Sold to Guyana and renamed GDFS Essequibo; was active as a coast guard vessel and decomissioned in 2025
Ribble	M2012	Gt Yarmouth	19 February 1986	1995	Sold to Brazil and renamed Jorge Leite, then Taurus; as a survey ship
Spey	M2013	Lowestoft	4 April 1986	1998	Sold to Brazil and renamed Pegasus then Bocaina; currently active as a patrol corvette
Arun	M2014		29 April 1986	1998	Sold to Brazil and renamed Babitonga; currently active as a patrol corvette
