= Padma-class patrol vessel =

Ship of Bangladesh

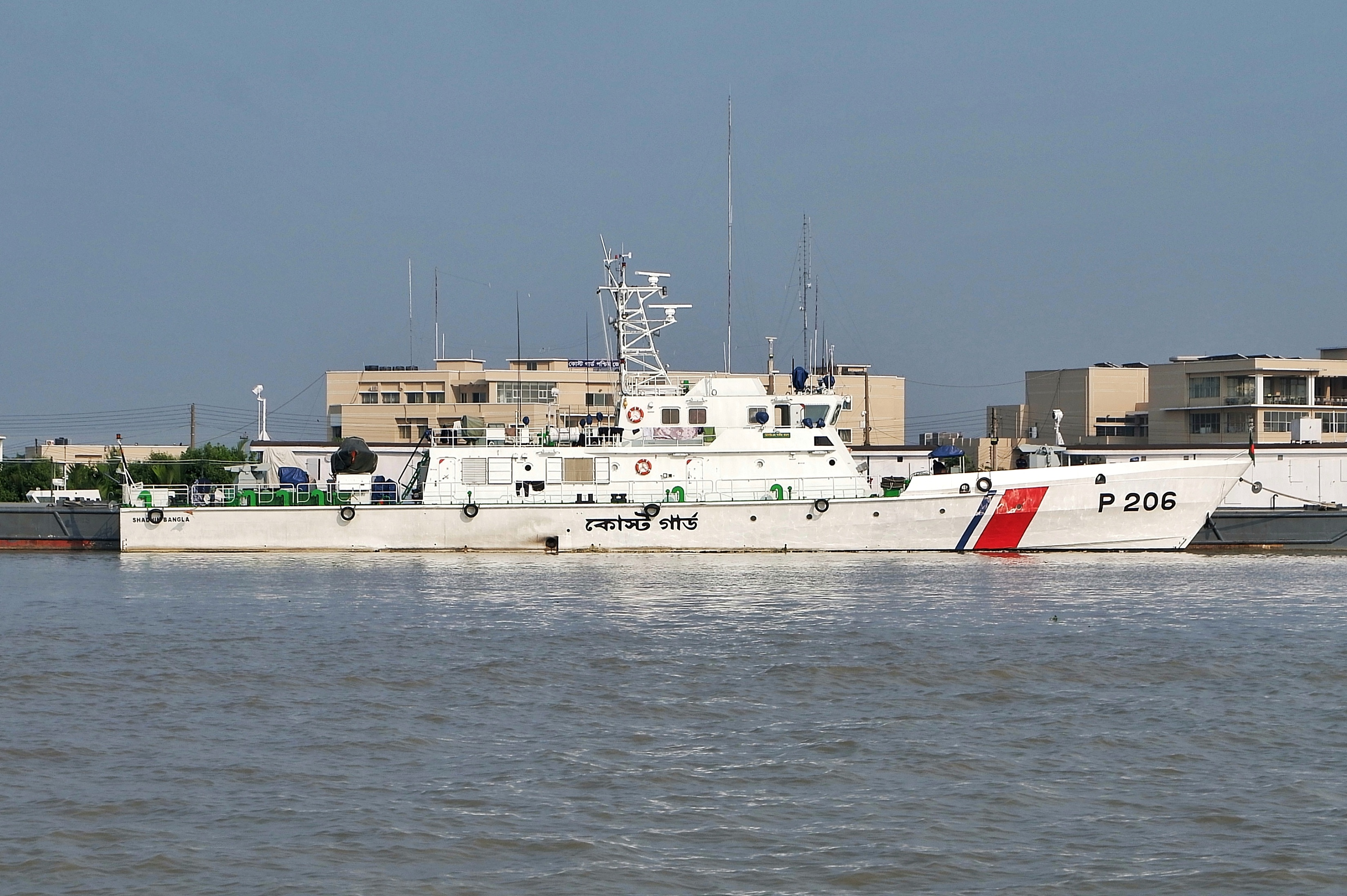

Class overview
- Name: Padma class
- Builders: Khulna Shipyard
- Operators: Bangladesh Navy
- Subclasses: Sobuj Bangla-class
- Built: 2011–present
- In commission: 2013–present
- Planned: 23
- Completed: 10
- Active: 10

General characteristics
- Type: Patrol vessel
- Displacement: 350 tons
- Length: 51.6 m (169 ft)
- Beam: 24.61 ft (7.50 m)
- Draught: 13.45 ft (4.10 m)
- Propulsion: 2 shafts, 2 diesels
- Speed: 21 knots (39 km/h; 24 mph)
- Range: 1500 nm
- Endurance: 7 days
- Boats & landing craft carried: 1 x RIB boat
- Complement: 45
- Armament: Batch-1: 2 × dual 37 mm cannon; 2 × 20 mm AA guns; Naval mines; Batch-2: 1 × Bofors 40 mm L/60 cannon; 2 × 12.7mm CIS 50MG

The Padma class is a class of patrol vessels operated by the Bangladesh Navy and the Coast Guard. The ships were constructed at the Khulna Shipyard, through a development program overseen and supported by the CSIC.

== History ==
Under a long-term modernization plan for its armed forces, the Government of Bangladesh decided to order arms from internal contractors. The first step taken was to order warships for the Bangladesh Navy from Khulna Shipyard. Khulna Shipyard signed the construction contract with the Bangladesh Navy on 2 May 2010 and Prime Minister Sheikh Hasina inaugurated the construction on 5 March 2011. The first warship of this class, BNS Padma was launched on 8 October 2012 and commissioned into the Bangladesh Navy on 24 January 2013. The second patrol craft in the class, BNS Surma, was launched on 23 January 2013 and commissioned into the Bangladesh Navy on 29 August 2013. The other three ships BNS Aparajeya, BNS Adamya and BNS Atandra were handed over to the Bangladesh Navy on 15 December 2013. These three ships were commissioned on 23 December 2013.

On 20 May 2019, Directorate General of Defense Purchase (DGDP) ordered further five units of the ships of this class for the Bangladesh Navy. Keel laying of the ships were done on 2 December 2019.

== Design ==
The launch of the indigenous warship paved the way for the Bangladesh Navy to soon deploy its own design. Built at the Khulna Shipyard, the design is an offshore patrol vessel that displaces 350 tonnes. The ships are 165.35 feet (50.40 m) long, with a beam of 24.61 ft (7.50 m) and a draught of 13.45 ft (4.10 m). The ships can carry out missions lasting up to seven days at a time. They have a complement of 45 personnel with a top speed of 23 knots (43 km/h; 26 mph).

== Armament ==
The first batch of ships are equipped with a pair of dual 37 mm naval guns and another pair of 20 mm anti-aircraft guns. Second batch of the ships carry one Bofors 40 mm L/60 cannon and a pair of 12.7mm CIS 50MGs. All these ships can lay mines and can carry MANPADs.

== Ships in the class ==
Bangladesh Navy

Pennant Number	Name	Builder	Ordered	Laid Down	Launched	Commissioned	Status
P 312	BNS Padma	Khulna Shipyard	2 May 2010	5 March 2011	8 October 2012	24 January 2013	Active
P 313	BNS Surma	Khulna Shipyard	2 May 2010	5 March 2011	23 January 2013	29 August 2013	Active
P 261	BNS Aparajeya	Khulna Shipyard	2 May 2010	5 March 2011		23 December 2013	Active
P 262	BNS Adamya	Khulna Shipyard	2 May 2010	5 March 2011		23 December 2013	Active
P 263	BNS Atandra	Khulna Shipyard	2 May 2010	5 March 2011		23 December 2013	Active
P 411	BNS Shaheed Daulat	Khulna Shipyard	20 May 2019	2 December 2019	14 February 2022	12 July 2023	Active
P 412	BNS Shaheed Farid	Khulna Shipyard	20 May 2019	2 December 2019	24 June 2022	12 July 2023	Active
P 413	BNS Shaheed Mohibullah	Khulna Shipyard	20 May 2019	2 December 2019	27 July 2022	12 July 2023	Active
P 414	BNS Shaheed Akhtaruddin	Khulna Shipyard	20 May 2019	2 December 2019	24 February 2023	12 July 2023	Active
P 415	BNS Bishkhali	Khulna Shipyard	20 May 2019	2 December 2019		30 November 2024	Active

== See also ==
- List of active ships of the Bangladesh Navy
- List of ships of the Bangladesh Coast Guard
