= Khulna Shipyard =

Bangladeshi state-owned shipyard company

Khulna Shipyard Limited
- Type: State owned enterprise
- Industry: Shipbuilding; Ship engineering Defence; Rubber factory
- Founded: 1957; 69 years ago
- Headquarters: Labanchara, Khulna, Bangladesh
- Key people: Admiral Khondkar Misbah-ul-Azim, Chairman; Rear Admiral Md. Abdul Latif, Managing Director
- Products: Warship; Merchant Vessel; Tankers; Platform supply vessel Various rubber products
- Net income: ▲৳58 crore ▲US$7 million (2015)
- Owner: Bangladesh Navy
- Number of employees: 30 Navy officers 10 Navy sailors 343 civil staff 1359 employees
- Website: www.khulnashipyard.gov.bd

The Khulna Shipyard Limited (Bengali: খুলনা শিপইয়ার্ড লিমিটেড) is a Bangladeshi state-owned defense contractor based in Khulna, Bangladesh. It is located on 68.97 acres (27.91 ha) of land at Labanchara, Khulna, Bangladesh. It is about 45 km north from the Port of Mongla. The shipyard has the capacity to build steel / aluminium ships up to 90 m length and 700 tons lightweight. The shipyard has a slipway with a capacity to dock and undock vessels up to 700 tons lightweight and overall length of 84 meters.

The KSY Limited is the largest military shipbuilding company in Bangladesh, and one of Asia's largest builder of complex warships. It has built numerous small to medium-sized patrol crafts, boats, oil tankers and other vessels for the Bangladesh Navy, the Bangladesh Coast Guard and other organizations. As of January 2022, the shipyard has built 775 vessels (including all categories) and completed 2,363 ship repair work.

== History ==
The construction works of KSY started in 1954 under supervision of the East Pakistan Industrial Development Corporation (EPIDC) with the technical support of M/s. Stulcken Sohn, who provided the design for the construction of the yard facilities. After completion of works, It was commissioned on 27 November 1957, with the objective to build and repair ships of various clients, for defense, coast guard, oil company, ports and manufacture engineering parts to support other industries.

Burness Corleft+Partner and Maienform administratively and technically managed the company up to 1967. Afterwards the control was vested with its own expert engineers both technically and administratively. Through most of its early history the shipyard was not profitable, but it turned to profit between 1973 and 1984 before becoming unprofitable again.

On 3 October 1999, the Bangladesh Navy took over the responsibilities of KSY along with a 993.7 million taka debt. The Navy invested 614.6 million BDT in the shipyard during the handover.

In January 2005, Bangladesh Navy complained to Prime Minister Khaleda Zia that government organizations were not giving their contract to Khulna Shipyard. It also sought permission to import raw materials for the shipyard tax free. Member of parliament, Mahbubur Rahman, speculated that the reason for that was government officials would not get kickbacks if they awarded the contract to Khulna Shipyard.

By 2008, all outstanding debts were cleared and since then, the shipyard has been making profit. Its current production includes tugs, workboats and other vessels up to 5000 DWT.

In 2015, the Maldives had expressed interest in procuring patrol craft for its Coast Guard.

Khulna Shipyard provided six patrol crafts, designed by South African Icarus Marine, to Bangladesh Coast Guard in February 2022.

The shipyard, in cooperation with Swisscontact, is the home of Bangladesh's first internationally certified welding training facility. The facility was funded by Chevron.

== Projects ==
=== Padma and Sobuj Bangla-class patrol vessel ===
Under the first phase of FG2030 naval modernization program, Khulna Shipyard was given the contract to build an undisclosed number of Padma-class patrol vessel for the Bangladesh Navy and Sobuj Bangla-class batch 2 for the Bangladesh Coast Guard. On 2 May 2010, the Navy signed a contract for five vessel. On 17 July 2016, the Bangladesh Coast Guard awarded a contract for three vessel. On 20 May 2019, the Navy ordered five additional vessel.

== Completed ==
- 1978 - BNS Sahayak (A 512), a fleet replenishment ship, for Bangladesh Navy
- 1987 - BNFC Balaban (A 731), a floating crane, for Bangladesh Navy
- 2004 - BNT Rupsha (A 723), a Fleet coastal tug, for Bangladesh Navy
- 2004 - BNT Shibsha (A 724), a Fleet coastal tug, for Bangladesh Navy
- 2012 - BNS Padma (P 312), a patrol vessel, for Bangladesh Navy
- 2013 - BNS Surma (P 313), a patrol vessel, for Bangladesh Navy
- 2013 - BNS Aparajeya (P 261), a patrol vessel, for Bangladesh Navy
- 2013 - BNS Adamya (P 262), a patrol vessel, for Bangladesh Navy
- 2013 - BNS Atandra (P 263), a patrol vessel, for Bangladesh Navy
- 2015 - BNS Hatiya (), a Landing Craft Utility, for Bangladesh Navy
- 2015 - BNS Swandwip (), a Landing Craft Utility, for Bangladesh Navy
- 2016 - BNS Durgam (P 814), an ASW patrol craft, for Bangladesh Navy
- 2017 - BNS Nishan (P 815), an ASW patrol craft, for Bangladesh Navy
- 2017 - BNT Halda (A 725), a Fleet coastal tug, for Bangladesh Navy
- 2017 - BNT Poshur (A 726), a Fleet coastal tug, for Bangladesh Navy
- 2018 - CGS Sonar Bangla (P 204), a patrol vessel, for Bangladesh Coast Guard
- 2018 - CGS Aparajeya Bangla (P 205), a patrol vessel, for Bangladesh Coast Guard
- 2018 - CGS Shadhin Bangla (P 206), a patrol vessel, for Bangladesh Coast Guard
- 2020 - BNS Darshak (H 581), a Hydrographic survey vessel, for Bangladesh Navy
- 2020 - BNS Tallashi (H 582), a Hydrographic survey vessel, for Bangladesh Navy

== Ongoing ==
- 2019 - a Padma-class patrol vessel, a patrol vessel, for Bangladesh Navy
- 2019 - a Padma-class patrol vessel, a patrol vessel, for Bangladesh Navy
- 2019 - a Padma-class patrol vessel, a patrol vessel, for Bangladesh Navy
- 2019 - a Padma-class patrol vessel, a patrol vessel, for Bangladesh Navy
- 2019 - a Padma-class patrol vessel, a patrol vessel, for Bangladesh Navy
- 2020 - a self-propelled floating crane, for Bangladesh Coast Guard
- 2020 - a Tug Boat, for Bangladesh Coast Guard
- 2020 - a Tug Boat, for Bangladesh Coast Guard
- 2020 - a multi-hulled watercraft, for Bangladesh Navy
- 2020 - a multi-hulled watercraft, for Bangladesh Navy
- 2020 - a multi-hulled watercraft, for Bangladesh Navy
- 2020 - a multi-hulled watercraft, for Bangladesh Navy
- 2021 - a Hydrographic survey vessel, for Bangladesh Navy
- 2021 - a Hydrographic survey vessel, for Bangladesh Navy
- 2022 - a multi-hulled watercraft, for Bangladesh Navy
- 2022 - a multi-hulled watercraft, for Bangladesh Navy
- 2022 - a multi-hulled watercraft, for Bangladesh Navy
- 2022 - a multi-hulled watercraft, for Bangladesh Navy
- Dredgers for BIWTA

== See also ==
- Chittagong Dry Dock Limited
- Dockyard and Engineering Works Limited
- Shipbuilding in Bangladesh
- Radiant Shipyard Limited
- Defence industry of Bangladesh
