= Type 021 missile boat =

Chinese missile boat

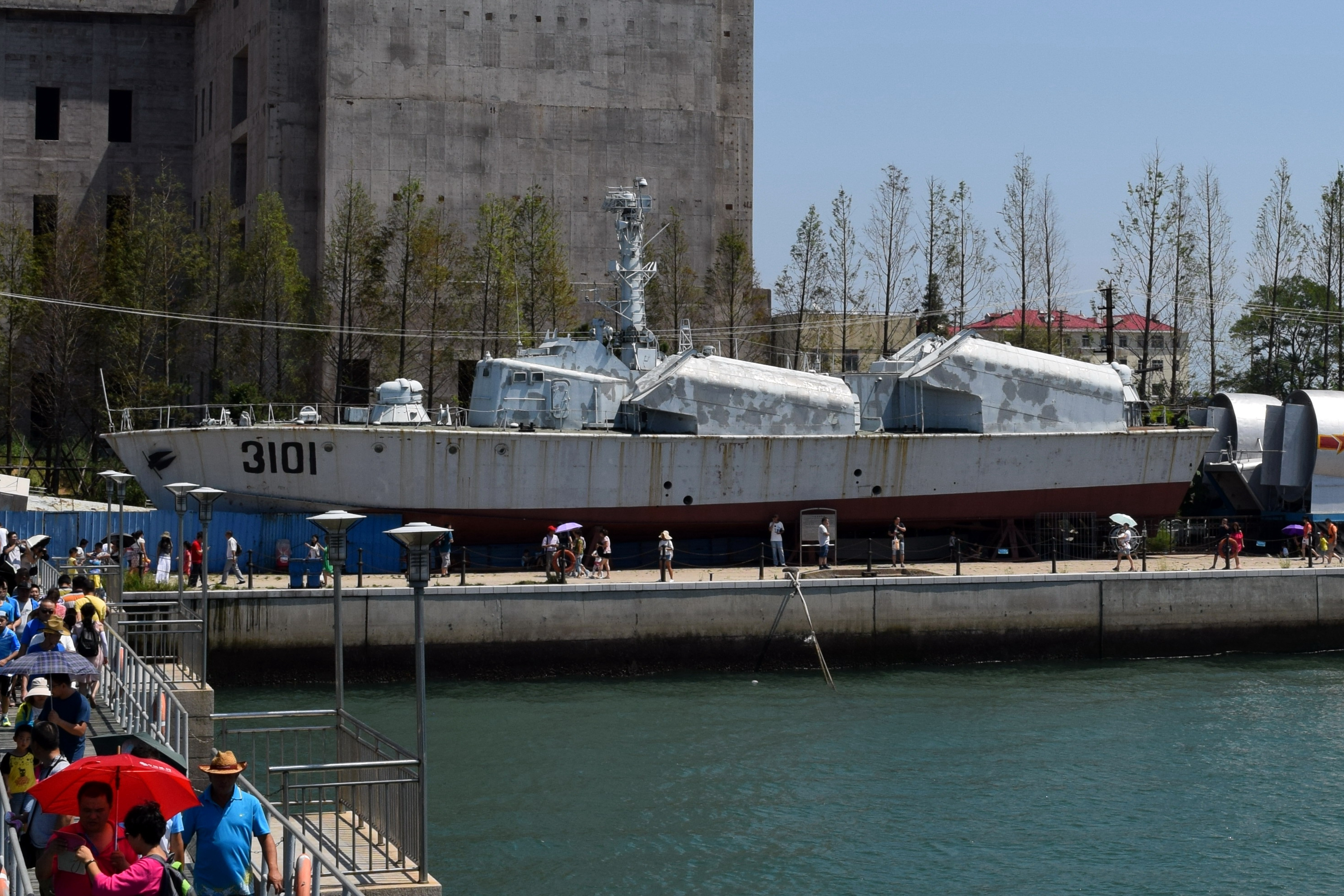
- Boat 3101 of Type 021 in Chinese Navy Museum

Class overview
- Builders: Hudong Shipyard
- Operators: People's Liberation Army Navy; Bangladesh Navy
- Preceded by: Osa-class missile boat
- Succeeded by: Type 037-IG class missile boat
- Subclasses: Huangfeng class; Hola class; Houdong class

General characteristics Huangfeng class
- Displacement: 205 tonnes
- Length: 38.6 m (127 ft)
- Beam: 6.8 m (22 ft)
- Draft: 2.7 m (8 ft 10 in)
- Speed: 35 knots (65 km/h; 40 mph)
- Range: 350 nmi (650 km; 400 mi) or 800 nmi (1,500 km; 920 mi) at 30 knots (56 km/h; 35 mph)
- Complement: 28
- Sensors & processing systems: 1× Type 352 Square Tie; 1× Fire control radar in aft radome (some)
- Armament: 4 × Silkworm missiles or; 4× C-101 supersonic anti-ship missiles; 4× AK-230; 2× 25 mm (II x 2)

General characteristics Houdong class
- Displacement: 205 tonnes
- Length: 38.6 m (127 ft)
- Beam: 6.8 m (22 ft)
- Draft: 2.7 m (8 ft 10 in)
- Installed power: 3× copies of Soviet M503 diesel engines at 8,025 hp (5,984 kW)
- Propulsion: 3 shafts
- Speed: 35 knots (65 km/h; 40 mph)
- Range: 800 nmi (1,500 km; 920 mi) at 30 knots (56 km/h; 35 mph)
- Complement: 28
- Sensors & processing systems: 1× Type SR-47; 1× RM 1070A; 1× Type 341
- Armament: 4× C-801/802; 2× AK-230; 2× 23 mm (II x 2)

China first received a single unit of Soviet Osa-class missile boat in January 1965, and four more in 1966 through 1967 and the last two in 1968. The Hudong Shipyard built the Chinese version as Type 021-class missile boat at a rate of ten boats per year with several different versions. The majority of this class is being transferred to reserve status. By 2008 only around 14 Huangfeng boats were active , several dozen remain active and these active units are being rearmed with C-101 supersonic anti-ship missiles. Bangladesh Navy Type 021 missile boats rearmed with C-704 high subsonic anti-ship missiles. These boats are effectively used in swarm missile attacks.

On May 31, 2011, the last four Type 021 missile boats of the Navy held a grand decommissioning ceremony in the South China Sea, thus successfully completing their more than 30-year historical mission and retiring from service. The picture shows a Type 021 missile boat.

== Huangfeng class ==
The Huangfeng-class missile boat is the direct Chinese copy of Soviet Osa-class missile boat. Around 130 were built, including exported units. This class consists of several versions with different armament. Most are armed with twin 25mm guns, while some are armed with a single AK-230 gun mount. The majority lack the fire control radars but some do have a radar radome aft (between the two missile launchers).

The Chinese engine is an improvement of the Huangfeng class over the original Soviet M503A diesel engine. The range of the boat is more than doubled without significant proportional increase of fuel consumption. However, due to the limited size of the boat, the actual endurance is not drastically increased because there is not enough extra space to store additional provisions needed for the longer endurance. Other improvements over the original Soviet Osa-I class included a much improved fire extinguishing system and life support system.

== Hola class ==
A single unit of Type 021 without the gun is called Hola-class missile boat. The Hola-class missile boat is slightly larger than the Huangfeng class, with the length increased to more than 42 metres (138 ft). The boat has an additional radar radome that is also onboard many Huangfeng class boats.

There is an additional pair of missile launchers added, and this pair can be readily removed when needed. The mast is redesigned so that it can be folded down when entering the protective cave in the mountains. The design is more successful than the Homa class and despite its age, the Hola-class boat remains in active service like a few of its Huangfeng class cousins. This class is also known as Hela class.

== Houdong class ==
The Houdong-class missile boat is the newest upgrade of the Type 021-class missile boat. The new boat is modified to carry C-801/802/803 missiles. It retains the hull of the original Type 021.

Although the design was successful, more capable missile boats such as the Houxing-class missile boat were already becoming available, so the Houdong class was geared for export. Iran is the first customer and the one in Chinese inventory is used for training foreign crews, and as a demonstrator to other potential customers, as well as other test and trial purposes.

== Operators ==
=== Huangfeng ===
Bangladesh

- Bangladesh Navy – 5 boats acquired in 1988-1992.

China

- People's Liberation Army Navy

Pakistan

- Pakistan Navy – 4 boats acquired in 1984, all decommissioned.

North Korea

- Korean People's Navy – 4 boats acquired in 1980.

Yemen

- Yemeni Navy – 3 boats acquired in 1995.

=== Hola ===
China

- People's Liberation Army Navy

=== Houdong ===
Iran

- Islamic Republic of Iran Navy – 10 boats acquired in 1994-1996.
