= STK 50MG =

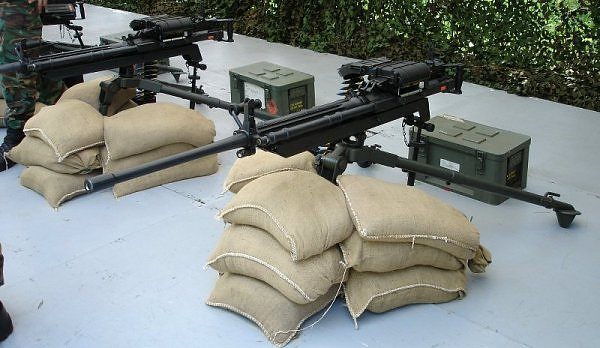
- The CIS 50MG on display during Singapore Army open house 2007.
- Type: Heavy machine gun
- Place of origin: Singapore

Service history
- In service: 1991–present
- Used by: See Users
- Wars: Myanmar conflict

Production history
- Designer: Chartered Industries of Singapore
- Designed: Mid-1980s
- Manufacturer: • CIS: 1988–2000 • ST Kinetics: 2000–2018 • ST Engineering: 2018–present
- Produced: 1988–present

Specifications
- Mass: 30 kg (66.14 lb) (complete gun assembly w/o feed chute and tripod adaptor)
- Length: 1,778 mm (70.0 in) with stock
- Barrel length: 1,143 mm (45.0 in)
- Width: 190 mm (7.5 in)
- Cartridge: 12.7×99mm NATO
- Calibre: 12.7 mm (0.50 in)
- Barrels: Single barrel (progressive RH parabolic twist, 8 grooves)
- Action: Gas-operated, rotating bolt
- Rate of fire: 400–600 rounds/min
- Muzzle velocity: 890 m/s (2,920 ft/s)
- Feed system: Single sprocket Belt-fed with dual-feed chutes
- Sights: Folding leaf sight

The STK 50 MG, formerly known as the CIS 50MG, (Note: Using the Wayback machine on this CIS 50 page indicates that the CIS 50 MG name was used until 2016, when it changed to the STK 50 MG name as seen here.) is a gas-operated, air-cooled, belt-fed heavy machine gun developed and manufactured by Chartered Industries of Singapore (CIS, now ST Engineering) in the late 1980s, in response to a request by the Singaporean Defence Ministry to replace the 12.7mm Browning M2HB machine guns then in ubiquitous service with the Singapore Armed Forces (SAF).

The aim was to have a brand new heavy machine gun design, that fires the same type of .50 cal rounds as the M2HB machine guns and to have the gun parts more readily available in view of easing SAF's chain of logistics and supplies.

== Design ==
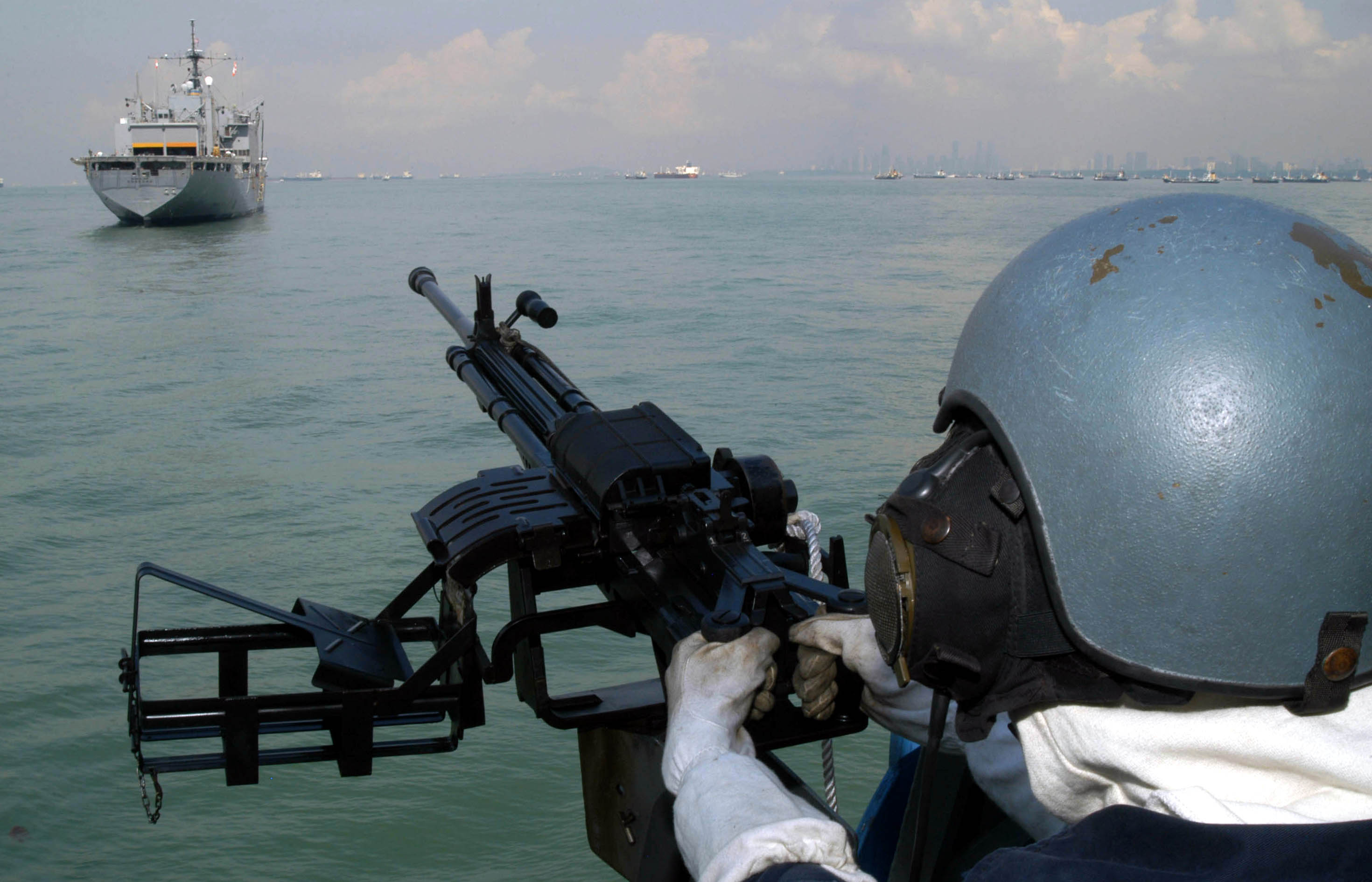
Close in defence aboard RSS Resilience

The CIS engineers learned from the lesson of the canceled (lack of funding) American "Dover Devil GPHMG" program known as the Special Projects Group at Picatinny Arsenal led by Charles J. Rhoades. Curt Johnson and Phil Baker developed the original concept to create a modular weapon suited for modern tactical doctrines and production techniques. In 1988, CIS introduced the new 12.7mm machine gun which was aptly named as the CIS 50MG, after two years of development and testing phase.

As the STK 50 MG is a gas-operated, air-cooled, belt-fed weapon, the gun is operated using dual gas pistons, located in two gas tubes placed on either side of the barrel. The barrel is locked by means of a rotary bolt with multiple radial lugs that engages the barrel extension, eliminating the need for headspace adjustments. The CIS 50MG utilises the same "constant recoil" system used in the Ultimax 100 and it also has a quick-detachable barrel equipped with a carrying handle to facilitate the ease of barrel changing under combat situations or during operational manoeuvres.

=== Features ===
The one unique feature of the weapon is its dual belt-feed system, the system allows for fast and easy switching of ammunition from standard ball rounds to the Raufoss Mk 211 Armor-Piercing-Incendiary rounds or the Saboted light armor penetrator (SLAP), which are capable of penetrating a rolled homogeneous armour plate with a thickness of 25 mm (0.98 in) from a range of 1 km (0.62 mi).

Such systems are more commonly used in modern automatic cannons such as the M242 Bushmaster 25mm cannon and the Mk44 Bushmaster II 30mm cannon, both of which are also in use by the Singapore Army's Bionix AFVs.

== Users ==
- Bangladesh: Used by Bangladesh Navy on multiple ships.
- Indonesia: Licensed production by PT Pindad as the Pindad SMB-QCB (Senapan Mesin Berat-Quick Change Barrel) for the Indonesian military. In 2018, it has been renamed as SM5.
- Myanmar: Used by Myanmar military. Probably licensed production by Myanmar Directorate of Defence Industries as the MA-16.
- Nigeria: Used by the Nigerian Army.
- Singapore: Singapore Armed Forces & the Police Coast Guard

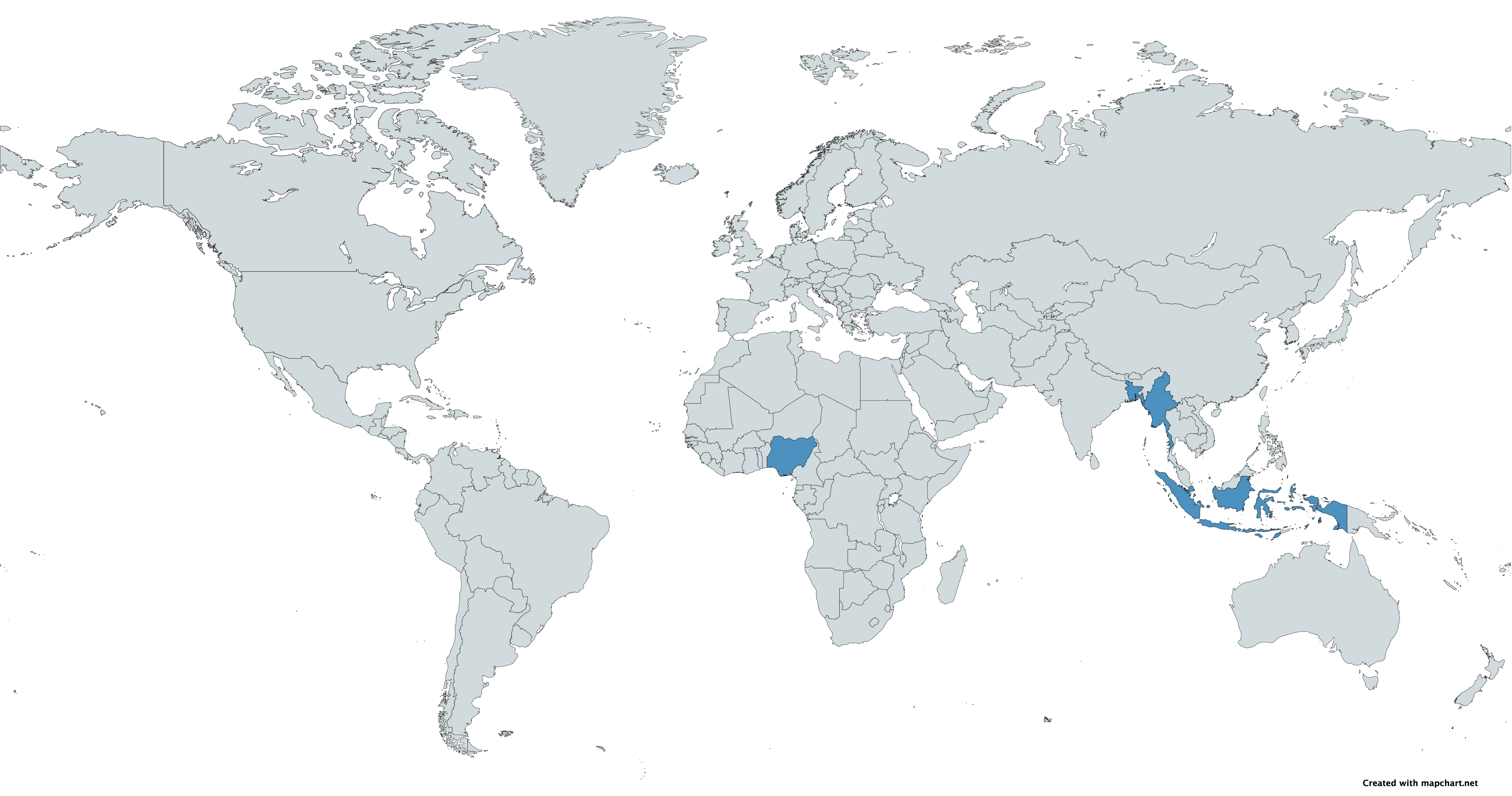
Map with STK 50 MG users in blue

== See also ==
- List of dual-feed firearms
- List of machine guns
