= Bangladesh–Myanmar relations =

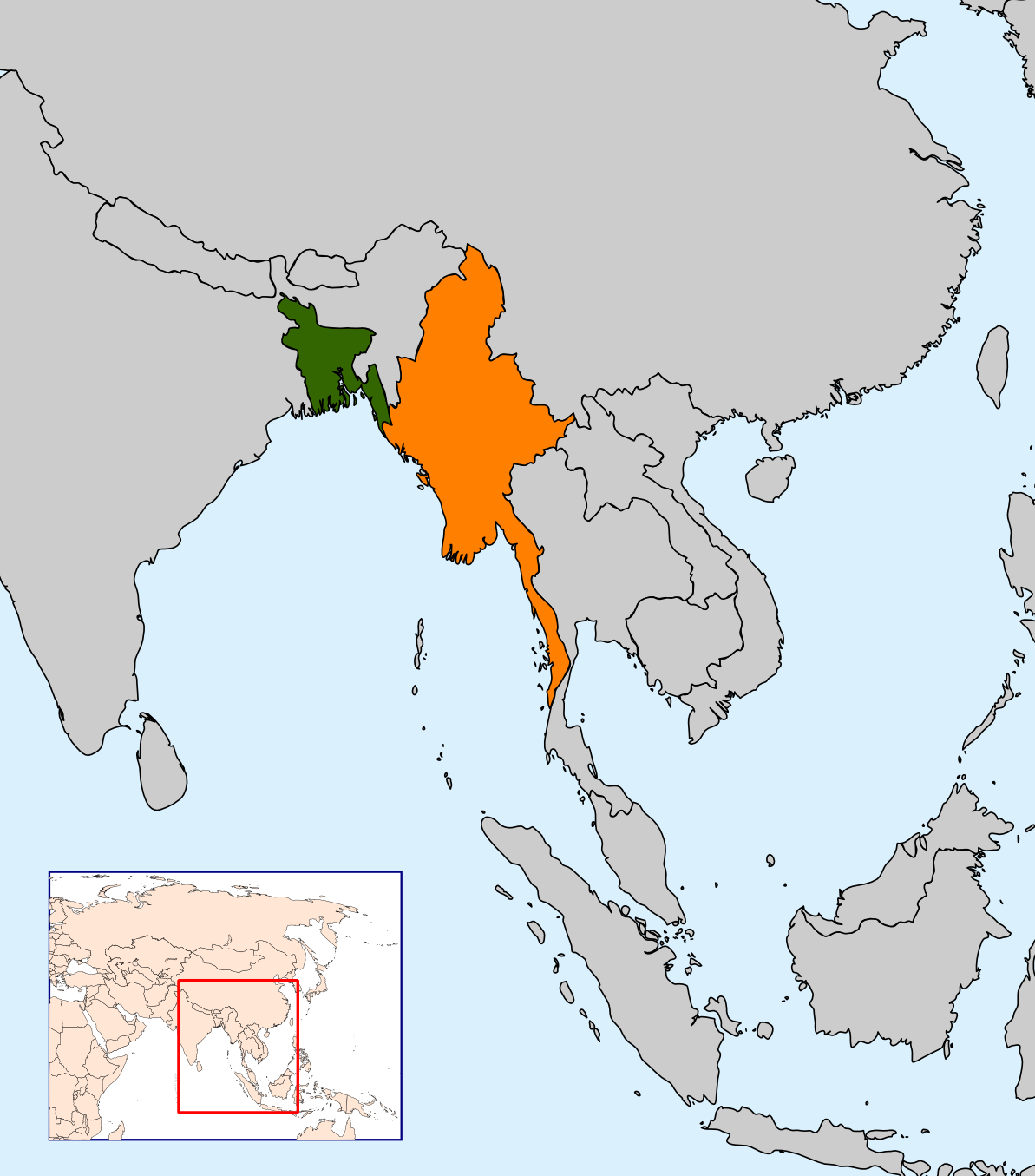

- Bangladesh: Myanmar

Bangladesh and Myanmar have a complex relationship under the military junta in Myanmar, and as a result of the presence of over 270,000 Rohingya refugees in Bangladesh. The civil society and political class of Bangladesh have often expressed solidarity for Myanmar's pro-democracy struggle against military rule.

Relations between the two nations soured as a result of Rohingya genocide which resulted in the influx of over 1.1 million Rohingya refugees from Rakhine State in Myanmar to Bangladesh. Despite being neighbouring countries, very little trade exists among these countries.

== History ==
=== Colonial era ===
Buddhism came to Myanmar in ancient times through Bengal. This shared Buddhist heritage was helpful in resisting the later British rule in the region, which expanded from Bengal outward to Myanmar (then Burma) in the 19th century. The monk U Ottama played a significant role in promoting ties between Burma and Bengali nationalists.

== Contemporary relations ==
In May 1979, Burmese President Ne Win visited Bangladesh. During his visit, on 23 May, a demarcation agreement between the two countries was signed.

Operation Clean and Beautiful Nation was a military operation conducted by the Tatmadaw (Myanmar Armed Forces) in northern Rakhine State, near Myanmar's border with Bangladesh in 1991. In December 1991, Tatmadaw soldiers crossed the border and accidentally fired on a Bangladeshi military outpost, resulting in Bangladesh Army aiding Rohingya Solidarity Organisation as retaliation. The conflict ended in Burmese tactical failure.

On 7 October 1998, between three and five Bangladeshi fishermen were killed by Burmese Navy forces just off the coast of St. Martin's Island. On 8 September 1999, one Bangladeshi fisherman was shot and killed by Burmese Navy forces near St. Martin's Island. Nine crewmen from the victim's fishing boat abandoned it, swam for their lives, and were rescued by Bangladeshi forces. The Bangladeshi government lodged a formal protest note to Myanmar. On 20 August 2000, the Bangladeshi police reported that Burmese border guards had shot and killed four Bangladeshi fishermen off the coast of St. Martin's Island.

The November 2008 Bangladesh–Myanmar naval standoff caused the relations between the two countries to deteriorate, as Myanmar allowed the South Korean company Daewoo to explore the seabed in an area southwest of St. Martin's Island, the area that was contested between Bangladesh and Myanmar as part of their respective exclusive economic zones. Myanmar deployed two naval warships to protect its assets. Citing international law, Bangladesh asserted that Myanmar should not allow any kind of activities in disputed territories until a resolution. After Bangladeshi requests were not heeded, the Bangladesh Navy deployed three warships in the area: the BNS Abu Bakr, BNS Madhumati, and BNS Nirbhoy. As a result, Myanmar withdrew its warships, and Daewoo began to remove its equipment from the area. In 2012, the International Tribunal for the Law of the Sea granted the disputed area to Bangladesh, resulting in both tactical and strategic victory for Bangladesh.

On 6 October 2018, the government of Myanmar updated its 2015–2018 map of Myanmar Information Management Unit showing St. Martin's Island as a part of their sovereign territory, and spread the maps on two global websites. Following the event, the Myanmar ambassador in Dhaka was summoned by the government of Bangladesh on 6 October 2018. Rear Admiral (retd) Md Khurshed Alam, maritime affairs secretary at the Bangladesh Ministry of Foreign Affairs, handed over a strongly worded protest note to him. The Myanmar envoy said it was a "mistake" to show St. Martin's Island as part of their country's territory.

Aung Kyaw Moe, the ambassador of Myanmar to Bangladesh, was called in four times by the Bangladesh Ministry of Foreign Affairs in 2022 due to the Myanmar Army's violation of Bangladesh's airspace in the Naikhongchhari bordering area multiple times.

Following the Arakan Army's rise and its control over most of Rakhine State, both countries's relations have been significantly influenced by the Arakan Army's growing presence along the border. Bangladesh has intensified border security and opened communication channels with the AA.

In May 2025, Bangladesh recalled Monowar Hossain, its ambassador to Myanmar, after allegations that he had opened lines of communication with the rebel Arakan Army.

=== Rohingya refugee crisis ===
Since 2016, according to the United Nations reports, as of January 2018, nearly 690,000 Rohingya people had fled or had been driven out of Rakhine State and sought refuge in Bangladesh. Approximately 65,000 Rohingya had reportedly fled from Myanmar to Bangladesh between October 2016 and January 2017, while an additional 23,000 were displaced within Myanmar.

In November 2017, Myanmar and Bangladesh announced a tentative deal to repatriate Rohingya refugees.

Between 2018 and 2019, attempts to return the refugees to Myanmar failed as they refused to leave on account of fear of persecution.

In May 2025, proposals for a UN-supervised humanitarian corridor to the Rakhine state sparked internal disagreements in Dhaka.

In August 2025, Bangladesh's Chief Adviser Muhammad Yunus stated in a conference that the country could no longer allocate additional resources for its 1.3 million Rohingya refugees, saying, "We don't foresee any scope whatsoever for further mobilization of resources from domestic sources, given our numerous challenges," and called for an international roadmap for repatriation. On the eighth anniversary of the 2017 exodus, thousands of Rohingya held protests in Cox's Bazar camps, reflecting dissatisfaction among the refugee population.

== Conflict ==
Myanmar recently made an incursion into Bangladesh's exclusive economic zone, but the Bangladesh navy took almost seven days to send a patrol boat where the Myanmar navy was firing shells at Bangladesh's Saint Martin's Island.

In December 2016, the Bangladeshi border guard accused the Myanmar Navy of firing on four Bangladeshi fishermen in the Bay of Bengal, leading to a formal protest.

== See also ==
- Bangladesh–Myanmar border
- Rohingya genocide
- Rohingya refugees in Bangladesh
