= International reactions to the Rohingya genocide =

Myanmar Countries that have recognized the events in Myanmar as a genocide Countries that have officially condemned the events in Myanmar Countries that have offered humanitarian aid to Rohingya Muslims Countries that have given support for Myanmar's policies regarding Rohingya Muslims

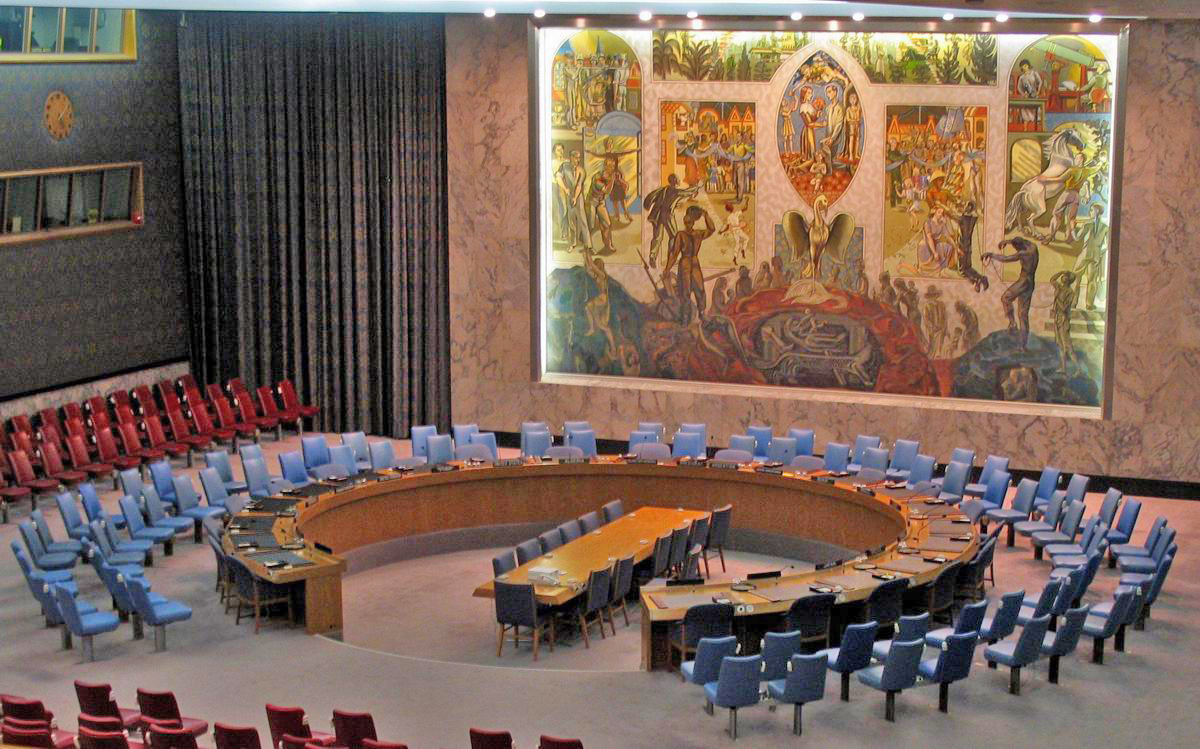
The United Nations Security Council has convened several times to discuss the Rohingya crisis

Rakhine State in Myanmar

The Rohingya genocide is a term applied to the persecution—including mass killings, mass rapes, village-burnings, deprivations, ethnic cleansing, and internments—of the Rohingya people of western Myanmar (particularly northern Rakhine state).

International reaction focused on pressuring Aung San Suu Kyi to condemn the atrocities and address human-rights issues. Aung San Suu Kyi's power was restricted under the 2008 Constitution of Myanmar, which placed key ministries like home, border affairs and defense under military control and reserved 25% of seats in the legislature for serving military officers. Military dictator Min Aung Hlaing is regarded as the most powerful person in the country, and in 2021 he launched a military coup, seizing control of the government.

== Background ==
Since October 2016, thousands of Rohingya refugees have fled Myanmar due to persecution in the Rakhine State. The exodus has become a humanitarian crisis. The persecution was preceded by crackdowns in 1978, 1991–1992, 2012 and 2015. The United Nations believes that Myanmar wants to expel its entire Rohingya population.

The events have been termed a genocide by international observers.

On 25 August 2017, the Tatmadaw (the Myanmar armed forces) launched a military operation against the Rohingya civilian population in response to attacks by Rohingya militants on 30 police posts and an army base. The Myanmar military—with help from mobs of local Rakhine people—is alleged to have burned Rohingya villages, carried out summary executions and beheadings of Rohingyas (including children), raped Rohingya women; and planted landmines. Between 400 and 3,000 people were killed between 25 August and 11 September 2017. On 22 September 2017, satellite images indicated that Rohingya villages were still being burned. An estimated 655,500 refugees had fled into Bangladesh since 25 August 2017 (a larger weekly outflow of refugees than during the Rwandan genocide), out of a pre-violence Rohingya population of about one million in Rakhine State. In August 2018, study estimated that more than 24,000+ Rohingya people were killed by the Myanmar military and the local Buddhists since the "clearance operations" started on 25 August 2017. The study also estimated that 18,000+ the Rohingya Muslim women and girls were raped, 116,000 Rohingya were beaten, 36,000 Rohingya were thrown into fire Mass graves have been discovered in several parts of Rakhine State. Evidence of atrocities emerged with reports of the Gu Dar Pyin massacre and Tula Toli massacre. Footage obtained by Reuters showed the summary execution of 10 Rohingya men. Two Myanma journalists who obtained the information for Reuters have since been arrested. Amnesty International has described Rakhine State as a "crime scene". There have been calls for the prosecution of members of Myanmar's military.

Despite centuries of settlement in the Arakan region (now Rakhine State), the Rohingya population are denied citizenship and other basic rights under several controversial Myanmar laws (particularly the 1982 Myanmar nationality law). Myanmar has been accused of genocide and ethnic cleansing of the Rohingya. Progress on a negotiated program for the return of Rohingya refugees from Bangladesh to Myanmar have been made much more difficult by the emergence of fighting in Rakhine State following the 2021 Myanmar coup d'etat.

The persecutions of ethnic Rohingyas in Myanmar continued up to 2018, and is viewed to continue until a lasting resolution is made between the Government of Myanmar (which has internal political disputes on the matter), the Government of Bangladesh, representatives from the Rohingya people, and states in the ASEAN (Association of Southeast Asian Nations).

== Countries ==
=== Afghanistan ===
The Afghan foreign ministry said in a written statement, "The Ministry of Foreign Affairs of the Islamic Republic of Afghanistan condemns in the strongest terms the devastating cruelty and murder of innocent Rohingya Muslims by Myanmar’s security forces. While vehemently condemning these vicious and inhuman attacks by the government forces against its Muslim population, the Ministry of Foreign Affairs calls on the United Nations and other International Human Rights Organizations to examine the genocide and massacre of innocent Muslim community in this country".

=== Algeria ===
The Algerian foreign ministry expressed "great concern" about the persecution. According to a spokesman, "The tragedies that occur behind closed doors in Burma where Burmese Muslim citizens are the victims, reached unspeakable heights in horror, according to information reported by many media and diplomatic sources".

=== Australia ===
In the spring of 2017 the Australian Senate passed a motion urging the government to call on the United Nations for a commission of inquiry. In early September 2017, as the Rohingya crisis became ethnic cleansing, Foreign Minister Julie Bishop said that Australia was deeply concerned by the escalating violence in Myanmar's Rakhine State and would provide up to A$5 million to help Rohingya refugees in Bangladesh.

Australia had long interned some of its own Rohingya refugees in camps on Manus Island in Papua New Guinea (whose government ruled the camps unlawful in 2016). PNG and Australia committed to closing the Manus Island camps by 31 October 2017. By mid-September 2017, Australia committed A$70 million more towards the Rohingya refugee crisis.

Melbourne based Australian documentary photographer Salahuddin Ahmad organized a documentary photography exhibition series "Brutality Against Humanity" in many Australian cities (as well as many international locations) including street photo exhibition in Federation Square, Melbourne. This photographic exhibition showcases evocative photos of the Rohinghya people taken in October 2017 in Bangladesh. The exhibition is being held to raise global awareness and to protect Rohingya ethnic community. Later Mr Ahmad and his colleagues conducted a study which estimated that more than 24,000+ Rohingya people were killed by the Myanmar military and the local Buddhists since the "clearance operations" started on 25 August 2017. The study also estimated that 18,000+ the Rohingya Muslim women and girls were raped, 116,000 Rohingya were beaten, 36,000 Rohingya were thrown into fire. Photos below are the selected photographs from "Brutality Against Humanity" photography exhibition series:

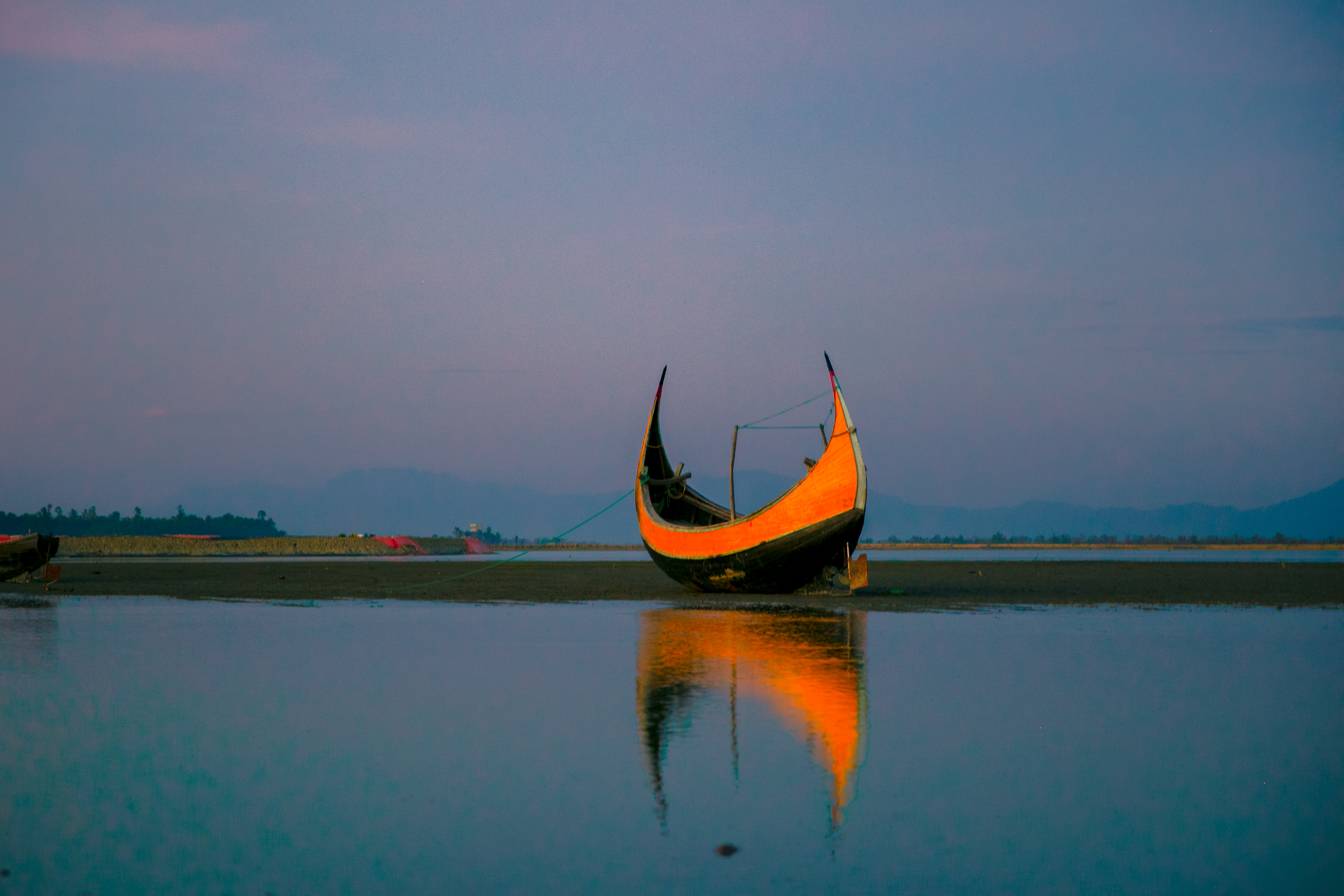
Fishing boat on the Naff river. A route used by thousands of desperate Rohingya to cross the river to take refuge in Bangladesh.

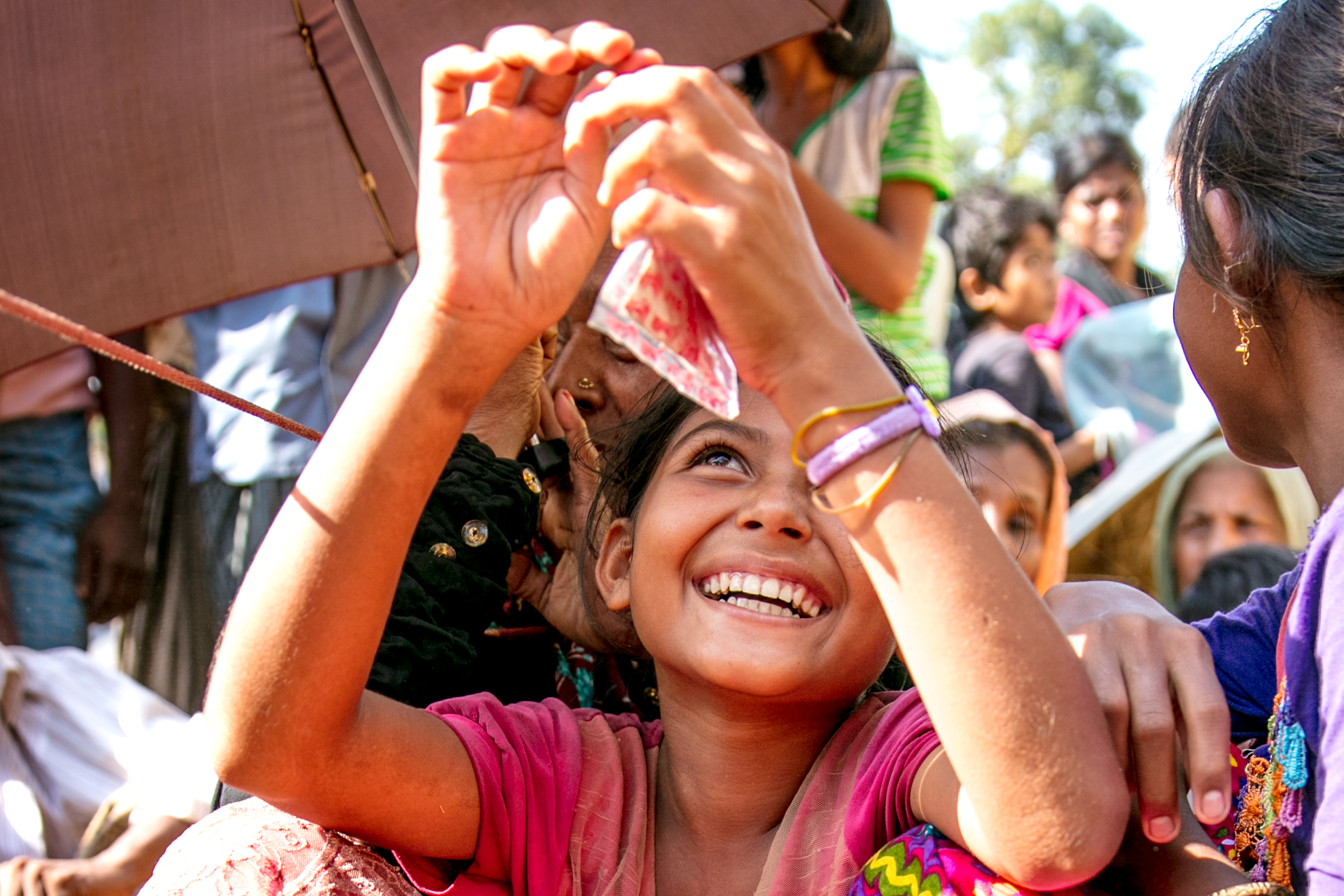
A forcedly displaced Rohingya girl queued and waiting with other hundreds to collect food and supplies at Kutupalong makeshift refugee camp.

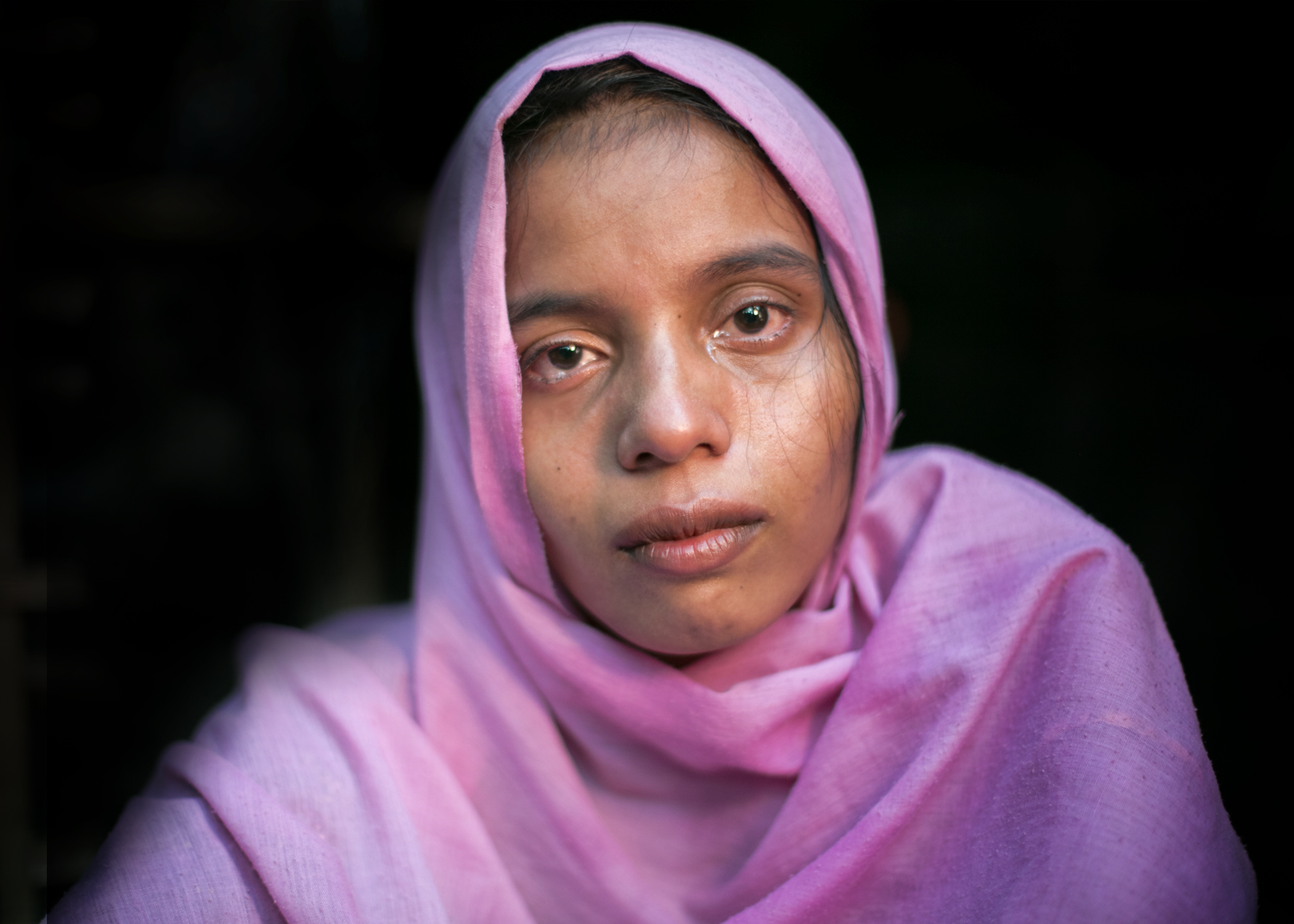
Hasina (21) witnessed the murder of more than 50 neighbours by the Myanmar Army, experienced extensive torture and was just lucky to survive.

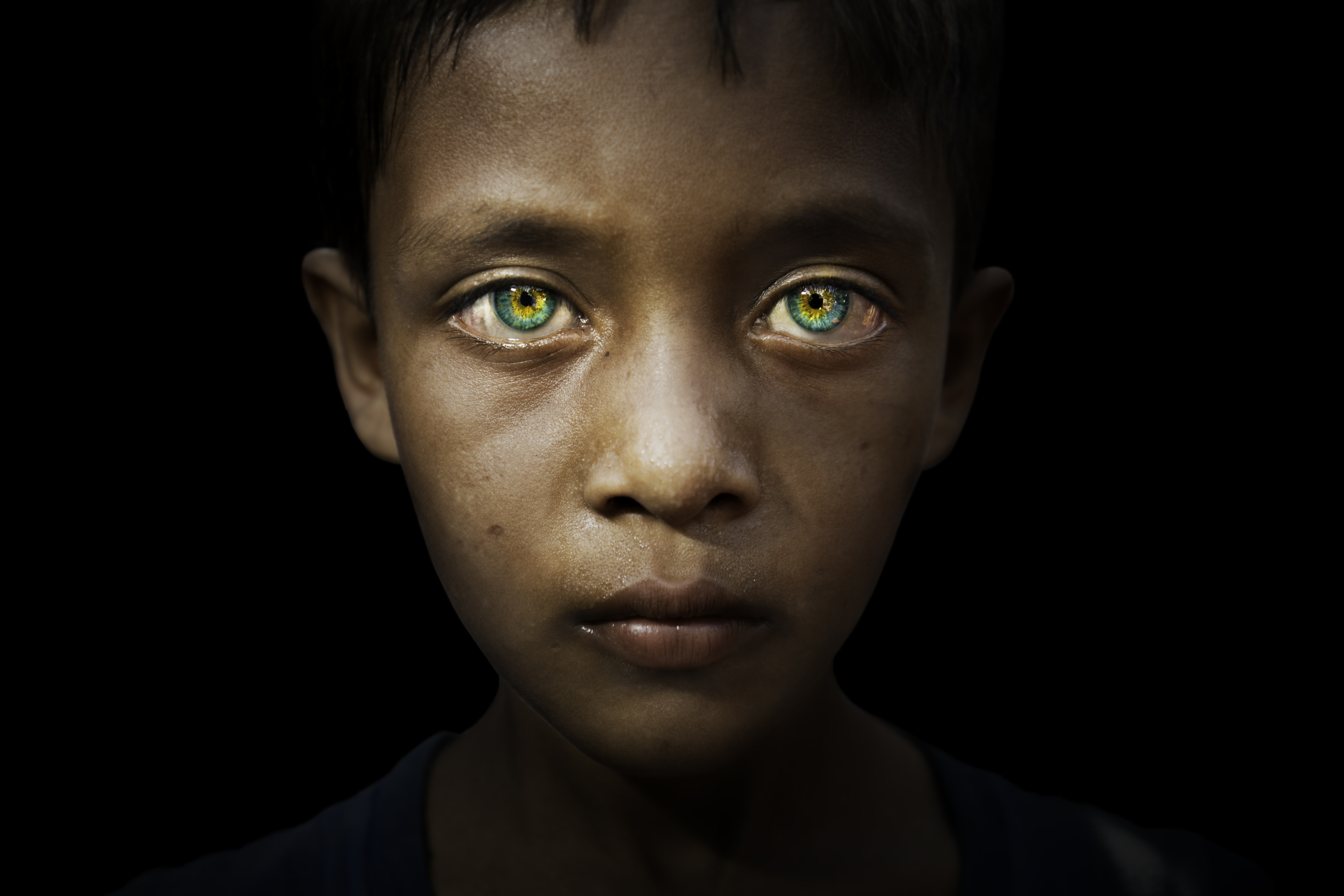
He is named as Kalar in Myanmar and Rohingya in Bangladesh. "Kalar" – a derogatory term in Myanmar used to describe Rohingya.

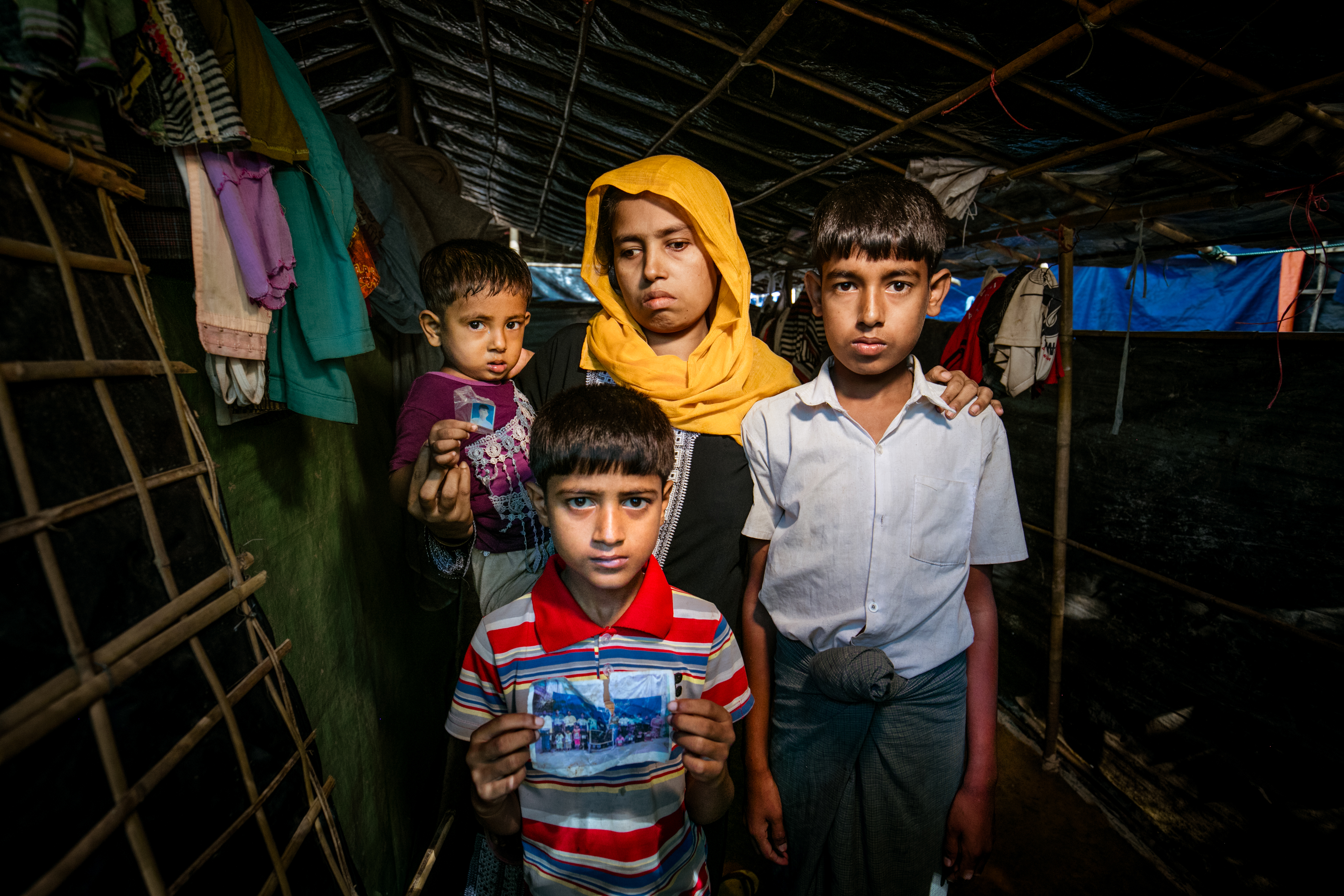
A Rohingya mother with her three children mourning for her elder son.

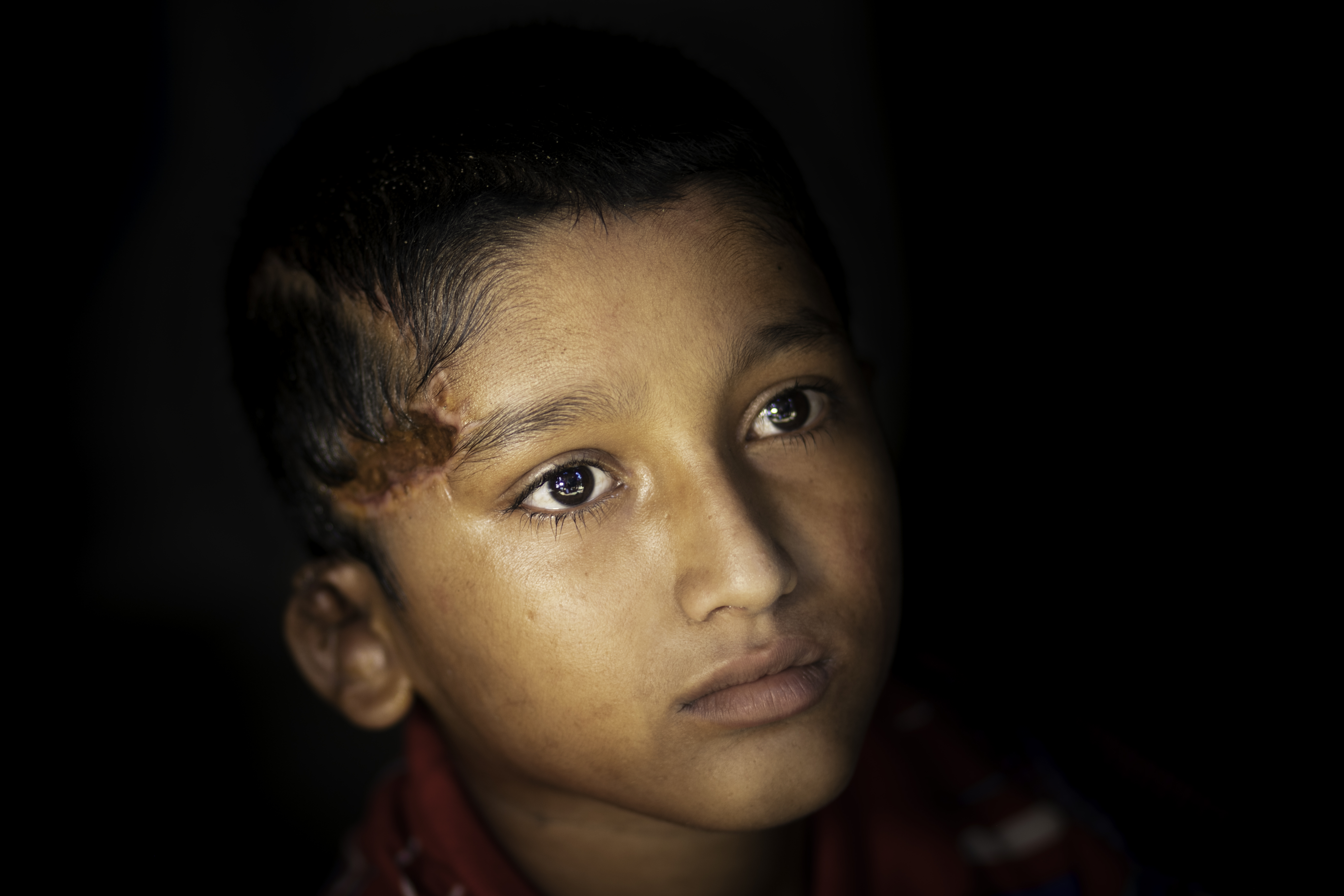
Ten-year-old Idris lost part of his ear due to a bullet and luckily survived. He was still unable to stand on his own several months after the incident.

=== Austria ===
The Austrian embassy in Myanmar demanded humanitarian access to affected areas in Rakhine State.

=== Azerbaijan ===
The government of Azerbaijan pledged to send material relief for Rohingya refugees and condemned the violence against civilians, saying that it supported Organization of Islamic Cooperation efforts to address the situation.

=== Bangladesh ===
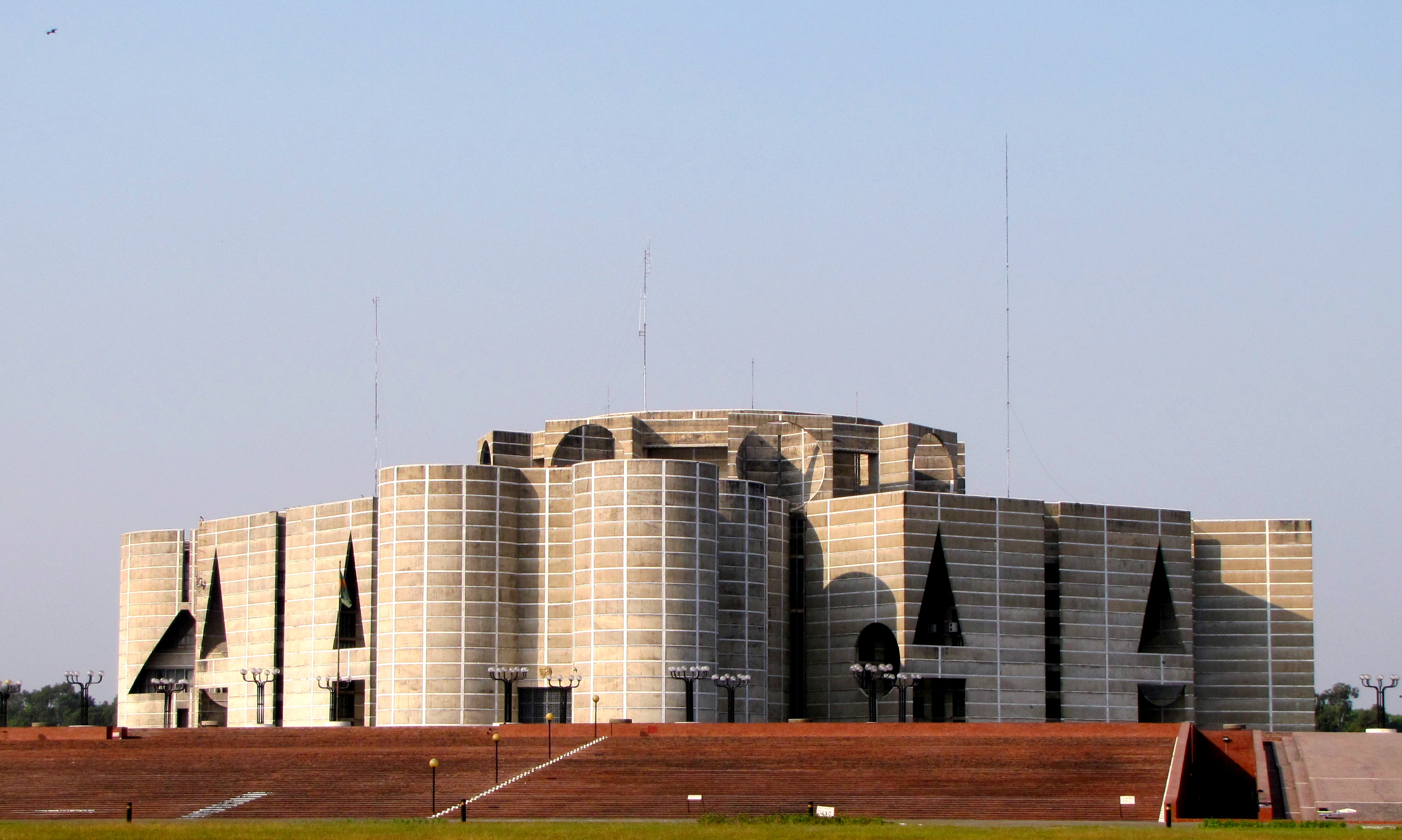
The Parliament of Bangladesh passed a resolution demanding citizenship and the right of return for the Rohingya in Myanmar.

Rohingya refugee camps in Bangladesh

Since 25 August 2017, Bangladesh has received at least 655,500 refugees. As of 11 January 2018, 971,627 refugees were registered in Bangladesh. The Parliament of Bangladesh adopted a unanimous resolution urging the international community to pressure Myanmar to provide citizenship and safe return for the Rohingya. The President of Bangladesh Mohammad Abdul Hamid suggested that a United Nations-administered humanitarian corridor be established in Myanmar for the Rohingya.

Prime Minister Sheikh Hasina said, "They (Myanmar) should stop the violence. The Myanmar government should have handled this situation patiently and not allowed the army to attack the common people. What are the crimes of the women, children, the innocent people? They are not responsible". Bangladesh Prime Minister Sheikh Hasina accused Myanmar of trying to "provoke a war with her country". She has offered to help the Burmese military, the Tatmadaw, quash the Arakan Rohingya Salvation Army (ARSA).

Foreign Minister Abul Hassan Mahmud Ali said that Myanmar's actions were being described as genocide. National Human Rights Commission of Bangladesh chairman Kazi Reazul Hoque alluded to the prospect of international prosecution of Myanmar forces: "The way the genocide has been carried out in Myanmar, the way the people were killed in arson attacks, we are thinking about pressing for a trial against Myanmar, and against the Myanmar army at an international tribunal". The Bangladeshi foreign ministry summoned the Myanmar envoy several times since the crisis began, protesting the refugee influx and alleged intrusions by Myanmar aircraft into Bangladeshi airspace. Major General Abul Hussain, a border force commander, promised a "befitting reply" to any "untoward situation" on the Bangladesh-Myanmar border.

Muhammad Yunus, recipient of the 2006 Nobel Peace Prize, made a seven-point proposal which included implementation of the Kofi Annan Commission report and UN-administered camps in Myanmar. In a rare moment of political unity, the BNP (Bangladesh's largest opposition party) supported Prime Minister Hasina's visit to refugee camps. Another opposition party, the Jatiya Party, demanded sanctions against Myanmar. The Bangladesh Armed Forces were reportedly placed on high alert. According to a Bangladeshi official, the government was focused on finding a peaceful resolution of the crisis and stated that "our goal is to ensure a stable, peaceful and safe environment in the Rakhine State so that people of all religion, color and community can live there in harmony, and we are holding discussions at various places to this end".

On 21 September 2017 Prime Minister Hasina addressed the United Nations General Assembly. She criticized Myanmar for ethnic cleansing, demanded implementation of the Kofi Annan Commission report and proposed a five-point plan for restoring stability in Rakhine State which included UN-monitored "safe zones".

On 29 September Masud Bin Momen, Permanent Representative of Bangladesh to the UN in New York, informed the Security Council that Myanmar intended to depopulate Rohingya lands by burning villages and was using rape as a weapon. According to Bin Momen, Myanmar had deployed two army divisions with heavy artillery near the border with Bangladesh since the first week of August. Bin Momen also reported of 19 violations by Myanmar military helicopters of Bangladeshi airspace, and repeated the Bangladeshi government's demand for the establishment of UN-supervised safe zones in Rakhine State.

In August 2025, a demonstration in Dhaka was held to express solidarity with the Rohingya.

=== Belgium ===
According to the Belgian foreign ministry, Deputy Prime Minister and Foreign Minister Didier Reynders said: "The first urgency is for tensions in Rakhine State to abate and to allow unlimited access for humanitarian aid. But it is also important to be able to take long-term measures in order to guarantee decent living conditions to the Rohingya population within the framework of the Burmese nation. Only these will make peaceful coexistence among different ethnicities in this State of Myanmar possible". The Belgian embassy in Myanmar demanded access for international NGOs to Rakhine State.

=== Brazil ===
Brazil has strongly supported resolutions adopted by bodies in the United Nations to find a permanent solution for the Rohingya.

=== Canada ===
Prime Minister Justin Trudeau discussed the situation during a telephone call to State Counsellor Aung San Suu Kyi, and the Canadian government pledged CA$1 million for relief support of Rohingya refugees. Foreign Minister Chrystia Freeland said the violence against the Rohingya "looks a lot like ethnic cleansing". According to the parliamentary secretary of the Canadian foreign ministry, "The violence is still ongoing so obviously there's a failure on part of the military, on the part of the government. I don't think we heard the end of this yet about what our role is going to be. As I said, we are still assessing the situation and we're looking for ways for Canada to be constructive. We are in discussion as well with our embassy over there, with our officials on the ground". The Canadian government has faced internal pressure to act, and pro-Rohingya protests in Toronto included Buddhist members of the Toronto city council.

On 21 September 2018, lawmakers from the House of Commons unanimously adopted a motion to recognize the Rohingya crisis as a genocide, describing it as 'crimes against humanity'. The House of Commons also endorsed the report from the UN High Commissioner for Refugees fact-finding mission in Myanmar.

The House of Commons, the lower house of the Parliament of Canada, voted unanimously on 27 September 2018 to revoke Suu Kyi's honorary Canadian citizenship in response to the actions of the Burmese government against the Rohingya. The upper house, the Senate, approved a motion to the same effect unanimously on 2 October 2018 which formalised the revocation. With revocation motions passed by both houses, the Government of Canada stated that it recognized Parliament's decision to revoke the honour.

=== China ===
China has supported Myanmar in the UN Security Council. Chinese leader Xi Jinping met Myanmar's military chief Senior General Min Aung Hlaing in November 2017. The general is widely considered as one of the masterminds behind the alleged ethnic cleansing campaign. The Chinese foreign ministry said "We condemn the violent attacks which happened in Rakhine state in Myanmar ... We support Myanmar's efforts in upholding peace and stability in the Rakhine state. We hope order and the normal life there will be recovered as soon as possible. We think the international community should support the efforts of Myanmar in safeguarding the stability of its national development".

Although China has traditionally supported Myanmar, the country's foreign minister Wang Yi expressed willingness to help Bangladesh and Myanmar find a solution to the crisis. The Chinese foreign minister visited Bangladesh and Myanmar and outlined a three-stage proposal for the return of refugees. China had also sent aid to Bangladesh for supporting the needs of Rohingya refugees.

There have been protests in the Hong Kong Special Administrative Region in support of the Rohingya.

According to Binoda Mishra, who heads the Centre for Studies in International Relations and Development in India:

"China supports Myanmar to retain its influence built over three decades of massive development aid and supply of military hardware, India supports Myanmar to play catch-up and build influence partly by development financing and partly by playing on civilisational linkages based on the shared Buddhist heritage. And both India and China engage the Burmese military as much as the civilian government because the country is key to India’s ‘Act East' policy and China’s Belt and Road Initiative."

China is Myanmar's northern neighbour and ally. China has been investing in the Kyaukpyu port which could provide a port for Sino-Myanmar pipelines, from the Bay of Bengal to Yunnan. As part of its "One Belt, One Road" program, China invested heavily in Rakhine State—including the development of China's strategically and economically critical first-ever seaport on the Indian Ocean, in the predominantly-Rohingya coastal Rakhine township of Maungdaw—providing a shorter route to the sea for landlocked Central and Western China.

China displayed intentions to develop Rakhine State commercially in other ways. With China's engagement in Rakhine state requiring cooperation with the Burmese military and government, China used its veto power in the U.N. Security Council to protect Myanmar from any forceful U.N. action over the Rohingya issue—and has argued that the solution to the Rohingya crisis is more development in Rakhine State.

On 17 November 2017, China announced that it would send Foreign Minister Wang Yi to Myanmar and Bangladesh in a bid to increase Beijing's influence in the region and mediate in the deepening Rohingya refugee crisis.

After 2017 Wang Yi has been mediating between Myanmar and Bangladesh, as well as supporting the Burmese government in the case at the International Court of Justice.

=== Denmark ===
Danish Minister for Development Cooperation Ulla Tornaes said, "Denmark stands ready with immediate financial support when our international humanitarian partners can provide assistance to all indigent people in Rakhine."

=== Egypt ===
The Egyptian foreign ministry condemned the massacre and displacement of the Rohingya and called for a permanent solution to the conflict.

=== France ===
French President Emmanuel Macron described the situation as "genocide" and "ethnic purification", and alluded to the prospect of UN-led intervention. In a statement, the French foreign ministry said: "As we recently indicated, France is concerned by the deteriorating security and humanitarian situation in Rakhine State. It calls for the cessation of violence against the civilian populations who have been forced to flee in huge numbers and demands that the Burmese security forces ensure their protection and guarantee the restoration of safe humanitarian access. We reaffirm our support for the work of the humanitarian organizations on the ground. They provide aid and protection to all civilian populations. We are helping the French NGOs in order to respond to the needs of the affected populations as well as the internally displaced persons in Rakhine State; this is in addition to France’s voluntary contribution to the Office of the United Nations High Commissioner for Refugees (UNHCR). France calls on Bangladesh to continue to accept the Rohingya who are seeking refuge within its borders. A political solution must be found in order to put an end to this cycle of violence. In this respect, we reaffirm our support for the Burmese government in implementing the recommendations of the Advisory Commission on Rakhine State chaired by Kofi Annan".

President Macron discussed the Rohingya crisis with Bangladeshi Nobel laureate Muhammad Yunus. He also met with Bangladeshi Prime Minister Sheikh Hasina and pledged continued support for achieving a permanent solution to the conflict.

=== Gambia ===
In 2019, The Gambia filed a case against Myanmar at the International Court of Justice for the Rohingya genocide. Myanmar sought to dismiss the case, arguing that the Gambia is acting as a proxy for the Organisation of Islamic Cooperation and not as a "country in its own right".

=== Germany ===
German Foreign Minister Sigmar Gabriel expressed grave concern with the situation in Rakhine State, calling on State Counsellor Aung San Suu Kyi to do more to end the conflict. Germany supported the implementation of the proposals made by the Kofi Annan Commission, and noted that it was a huge burden on Bangladesh to host the large refugee population.

The German foreign minister visited Rohingya refugee camps in Bangladesh.

=== Greece ===
The Greek embassy in Myanmar demanded humanitarian access for aid groups in Rakhine State.

=== Holy See ===
Pope Francis said, "Sad news has reached us of the persecution of our Rohingya brothers and sisters, a religious minority. I would like to express my full closeness to them – and let all of us ask the Lord to save them, and to raise up men and women of good will to help them, who shall give them their full rights".

The pope demanded that the international community "take decisive measures to address this grave crisis" and went on a diplomatic visit to the area in late November 2017.

After meeting Rohingya refugees in Dhaka, Bangladesh, the Pope said "the presence of God today is also called Rohingya".

=== India ===
The Government of India led by Prime Minister Narendra Modi has been largely silent on the atrocities faced by the Rohingya people in Myanmar. Modi traveled to Myanmar on 5–6 September 2017 and stated "we hope that all stakeholders together can find a way out in which unity and territorial integrity of Myanmar is respected". He did not use the term "Rohingya" and condemned attacks by Rohingya militants. During his visit, he reportedly advised State Counsellor Aung San Suu Kyi that she had "a very good international image" which she should not tarnish.

India also announced plans to deport its Rohingya refugee population. Minister of State for Home Affairs Kiren Rijiju described the refugees as "illegal immigrants", echoing the Myanmar government position. Although the Rohingya have fought deportation in the Indian courts (partly on humanitarian grounds), in September 2017 the Indian government responded that India did not sign the 1951 Refugee Convention and most Rohingya arrived in India before the August 2017 violence. Some Indian media have reported that the country's intelligence agencies suspect militant Royhinga leaders of conspiring with Pakistani terrorists and planning to incite violence in India.

Varun Gandhi, a leader in Modi's own ruling party and a grandson of Indira Gandhi, opposed the government's plan to expel 40,000 Royhinga refugees and called for their asylum after careful vetting. Gandhi said that India is a party to the SAARC Terrorism Protocol, whose Article 17 forbids India from deporting anyone on religious grounds. Minister of State for Home Hansraj Ahir dismissed Gandhi's view as "against national interest". The Chief Minister of West Bengal Mamata Banerjee called for support of Rohingya refugees, whom she described as "common people" who should not be seen as a security threat to India. Shashi Tharoor, a leader of the main opposition Indian National Congress party, criticized the Modi government for not having a "mechanism" to process asylum applications.

India later updated its response to the crisis. After Modi returned to India from Myanmar, the High Commissioner of Bangladesh met with the Foreign Secretary of India. Following the meeting, the Indian foreign ministry issued a statement: "We would urge that the situation in Rakhine be handled with restraint and maturity, focusing on the welfare of the civilian population alongside those of the security forces". The Indian Air Force began Operation Insaniyat to deliver aid for Rohingya refugees in Bangladesh.

In October 2017, External Affairs Minister Sushma Swaraj expressed India's support for a permanent solution to the crisis urged the international community to contribute to the social and economic development of Rakhine State. According to Swaraj, the Myanmar government should repatriate the refugees (who are Burmese nationals) and "punish the terrorists, not innocent people."

On the sidelines of CHOGM 2018, the Indian prime minister contradicted his own earlier position in a Commonwealth joint communique which supported the Rohingya's right of return to Myanmar. Speaking at a political rally of Non-Resident Indians titled "Bharat ki Baat, Saab ki Saath", Modi said "When the Rohingya people returned to Bangladesh, we understood that Bangladesh is our friend. So we started sending steamers full of aid there". The comment reportedly embarrassed Indian diplomats. An anonymous source in the Indian foreign ministry reportedly said "Prime Minister Narendra Modi may have suffered a slip of tongue. He could have meant that Rohingyas fled to Bangladesh, instead of saying the Rohingyas returned. But this is just conjecture". The Indian foreign ministry refused to publicly comment on Modi's remarks.

=== Indonesia ===
President of Indonesia Joko Widodo condemned the violence against the Rohingya and oversaw the departure of four Indonesian Air Force transport planes with 34 tons of relief supplies for Rohingya refugees in Bangladesh. Foreign Minister Retno Marsudi visited Myanmar and Bangladesh on 3–4 September 2017 to discuss the situation with State Counsellor Aung San Suu Kyi and Prime Minister Sheikh Hasina.

Indonesia has the largest Muslim population in the world and have sent support to the Rohingya. Protests erupted against the Burmese embassy in Jakarta, with a petrol bomb being thrown towards it. Indonesian president Joko Widodo sent foreign minister Retno Marsudi for "intensive communications" in September 2017, mentioning that concrete action was required. Aid in the form of tents, basic food and sanitation supplies was dispatched to refugee camps in Bangladesh through four Indonesian Air Force Lockheed C-130 Hercules.

In January 2018, President Widodo visited Rohingya refugee camps in Cox's Bazar while visiting Bangladesh. On 27 December 2023, hundreds of students from various universities in Aceh, such as Abulyatama University, Bina Bangsa Getsempena University, and University of Muhammadiyah Aceh, stormed a shelter for Rohingya refugees and forced them out of a convention centre in the city of Banda Aceh, demanding they be deported. The students were also seen kicking the belongings of the Rohingya men, women, and children who were seated on the floor and crying in fear. They burned tyres and chanted "Kick them out" and "Reject Rohingya in Aceh".

Former Attorney General of Indonesia, Marzuki Darusman will help file criminal charges against Min Aung Hlaing for the Rohingya genocide on 6 April 2026.

=== Iran ===
Iranian Foreign Minister Javad Zarif condemned Myanmar on behalf of the Iranian government. Zarif urged the international community to take action before it was too late.

Iranian President Hassan Rouhani has said his country will work to mount pressure on Myanmar from international side to resolve the Rohingya crisis. "We will work to create international pressure on Myanmar (to resolve the Rohingya crisis)," he said during a meeting with Prime Minister Sheikh Hasina at the bilateral booth of Baku Congress Center where the NAM Summit is taking place

=== Iraq ===
Iraq's Foreign Ministry released a statement: "The Iraqi Foreign Ministry expresses its firm rejection and condemnation of the crimes and atrocities committed by the government authorities in Myanmar against the safe minority of the Rohingya Muslims in Arakan province west of the country, And calls upon the United Nations, all organizations of international community and all Islamic and Arab countries to take all deterrent measures to stop these brutal massacres, which are less common in the world, in addition to serious work to open the way for the arrival of teams and humanitarian aid to the people of Rohingya immediately".

=== Ireland ===
The Irish embassy in Myanmar demanded the resumption of humanitarian work by international NGOs in Rakhine State.

=== Israel ===
The Israeli government froze military sales to Myanmar as a result of the crisis. A statement from the Israeli foreign ministry stated that "The State of Israel's oversight policy for defense exports are reviewed regularly in accordance with different considerations, including the human rights situation in the country, as well as the policy of the UN Security Council and other international bodies".

The Israeli Foreign Ministry offered Bangladesh a humanitarian aid package for Rohingya refugees. Bangladesh declined the offer.

Israel once refused to use the term "Rohingya" when responding to the genocide, seemingly in deference to the Myanmar government that rejects the term and does not recognise the Rohingya as citizens, instead considering them "Bengalis." Israel claimed that it stopped selling weapons to Myanmar in 2017 following pressure from human rights organisations and US / EU imposed sanctions over "alleged genocide". However, Burmese military officials were still allowed to visit a Tel Aviv Arms expo, with photos from the Israeli media. Israeli sales representatives at the expo responded that they were "unaware" of the ban.

=== Italy ===
The Italian government expressed grave concern and pledged 7 million euros for Rohingya refugees.

=== Japan ===
In August 2017, the Japanese government issued a statement: "Japan strongly condemns the attacks carried out against the Myanmar security forces in northern areas of Rakhine State in Myanmar since 25 August as utterly unacceptable and expresses its condolences to the bereaved families. Japan strongly expects that, with the restoration of security, the protection of civilian populations and humanitarian access is assured as soon as possible. Japan will support the efforts by the Myanmar government to implement the recommendations for realizing peace and stability in Rakhine State presented in the Final Report of the Advisory Commission on Rakhine State led by Former United Nations Secretary General Dr. Kofi Annan".

On 26 September 2017, the government of Japan extended a US$4 million emergency grant to aid Rohingya refugees in Myanmar and Bangladesh. In November 2017 and January 2018, Japanese foreign minister Taro Kono visited Rohingya refugee camps in Bangladesh and Rohingya villages in Myanmar.

On 19 October 2018, Japan's ambassador to Myanmar opposed Western sanctions on the country over the Rohingya issue, calling the campaign "utter nonsense". According to the Middle East Institute in October 2019, the Japanese embassy had remarked that overseas reports on Rakhine are unfair and exaggerated. As of 2021, Japan's Public Security Intelligence Agency has listed the Arakan Rohingya Salvation Army as a terrorist organisation.

=== Jordan ===
The Hashemite Kingdom of Jordan described the tragedy faced by the Rohingya as "unforgivable". The kingdom dispatched several batches of aid for refugees.

Queen Rania visited Rohingya refugee camps in Cox's Bazar, Bangladesh.

=== South Korea ===
The Republic of Korea pledged at least US$3.4 million in aid for Rohingya refugees through UN agencies.

=== Kuwait ===
The Kuwaiti government announced US$1.5 million in aid for Rohingya refugees.

=== Latvia ===
Latvia expressed its support for a UN Commission of Inquiry concerning the situation in Rakhine State, Myanmar.

=== Malaysia ===
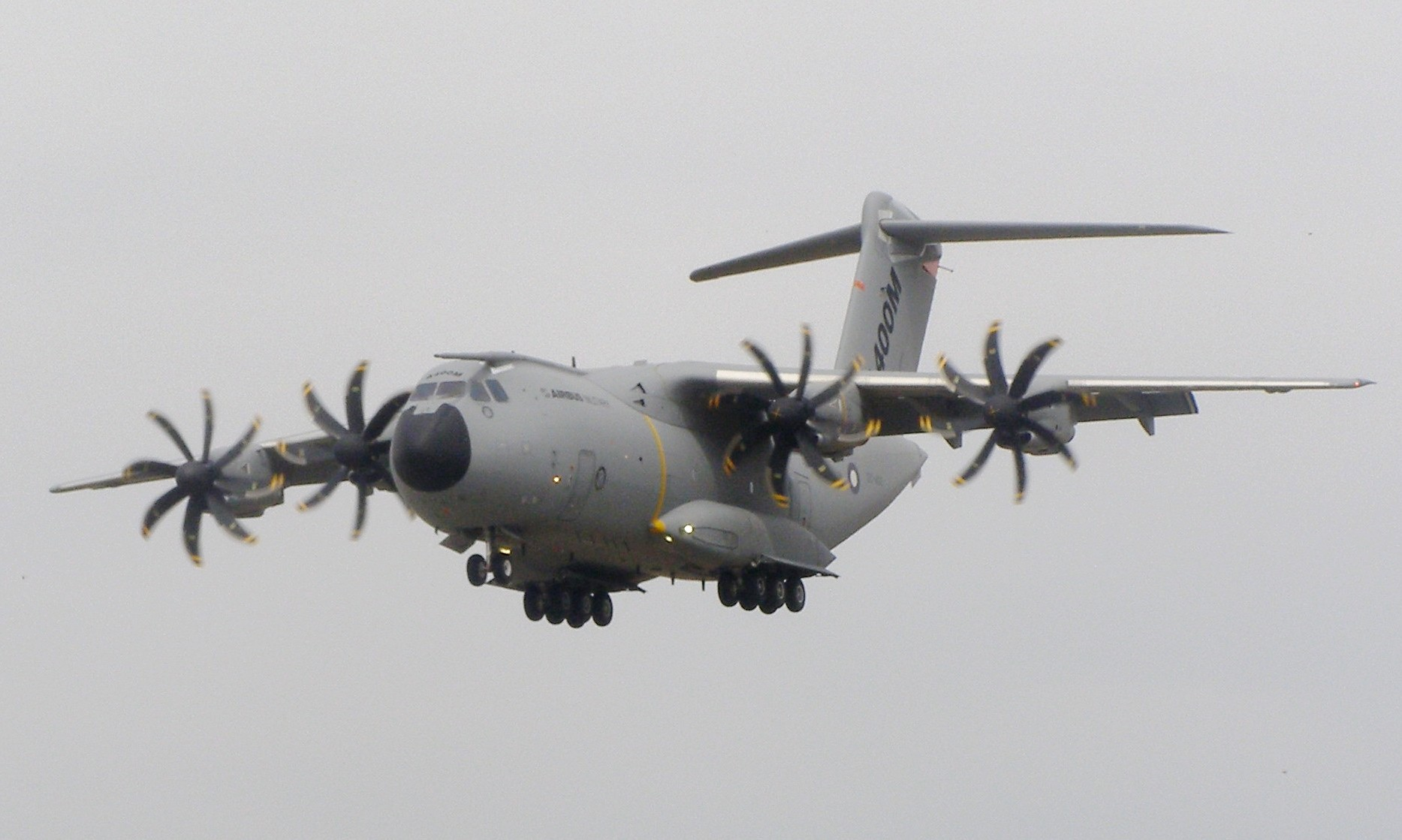
Two Royal Malaysian Air Force planes similar to this one were sent with relief supplies for Rohingya refugees in Bangladesh.

Malaysian Prime Minister Najib Razak described the Rohingya persecution as genocide and dispatched two Royal Malaysian Air Force planes with relief supplies for Rohingya refugees in Bangladesh. Malaysian Defense Minister Hishamuddin Hussein warned that terror groups might gain a foothold in Myanmar if the crisis was not addressed. However, during the 2017 ASEAN General-Assembly, Malaysia insisted on rejecting an ASEAN statement condemning attacks on Myanmar security forces and all acts of violence which result in the loss of civilian lives, destruction of homes and the displacement of large numbers of people. The rejection of the statement solidified ASEAN's stance for accepting human rights violations against Muslim Rohingyas, though Indonesia and Brunei were against the rejection.

=== Maldives ===
The Maldivian government said in a statement, "The Maldives condemns in the strongest terms, the atrocities committed against the Rohingya Muslim community in Myanmar, and is deeply concerned by the recent cycle of violence that resulted the death of dozens of Rohingya Muslims and displacing several thousands.The Rohingya Muslim minority continues to suffer under systematic repression and the United Nations has in the past documented such human rights violations against this minority group in Myanmar. The Maldives believes that the international community must act swiftly and firmly to stop the bloodshed. The Government of Maldives has decided to cease all trade ties with Myanmar, until the Government of Myanmar takes measures to prevent the atrocities being committed against Rohingya Muslims. The Government of Maldives requests the United Nations Secretary General and the United Nations Human Rights Council to look into the grave violations of human rights against the Rohingya Muslims in Myanmar".

=== Mexico ===
The Mexican government said in a statement, "On behalf of the government of Mexico, the Foreign Ministry expresses its deep concern about the recent escalation of violence against the Rohingya Muslim minority in Rakhine state in northern Myanmar. Mexico reiterates its repudiation of all forms of violence, its unconditional support for the peaceful settlement of disputes and its commitment to protecting and defending human rights. It also calls on the parties involved to exercise maximum restraint, protect the civilian population and guarantee access to humanitarian aid for those who need it most. In addition, Mexico expresses its solidarity with the authorities in Bangladesh, a country that has welcomed thousands of refugees as a result of the crisis in Rakhine.".

=== Morocco ===
The Kingdom of Morocco was one of the first countries to send aid shipments for Rohingya refugees in Bangladesh.

=== Myanmar ===
Denying that its forces committed atrocities, Myanmar has blamed "terrorists" for all violence (including the burning of villages). According to State Counsellor Aung San Suu Kyi, there was misinformation about the situation.

=== Netherlands ===
The Dutch government promised relief supplies and emergency financial support for the Rohingya refugees.

=== Nigeria ===
Nigerian President Muhammad Buhari described Myanmar's actions as ethnic cleansing and warned of a disaster comparable to the Bosnian and Rwandan genocides. The Nigerian government urged an end to ethnic cleansing in Myanmar.

=== Norway ===
The Norwegian government increased its humanitarian support of Myanmar and Bangladesh.

=== Pakistan ===
Pakistani Foreign Minister Khawaja Asif expressed anguish at the "violence against the Rohingya Muslims in Myanmar", calling it "a challenge to the conscience of the international community". At a meeting chaired by Prime Minister Shahid Khaqan Abbasi, the cabinet adopted a resolution: "We call upon Nobel laureate Ms Aung San Suu Kyi to take immediate steps to stop the atrocities being committed in Myanmar where her party is in power. We also call upon the United Nations to take the lead, which it must under its mandate, in stopping immediately the genocide of Rohingya Muslims by Myanmar". On 9 September, Foreign Secretary Tehmina Janjua summoned the Myanmar ambassador in Islamabad to register a formal protest. Thousands of Pakistanis demonstrated in major cities across the country, protesting against the crackdown on Rohingya Muslims.

=== Palestine ===
Palestinian President Mahmoud Abbas described the Rohingya exodus to Bangladesh as "a disaster".

=== Philippines ===
In 2016, during the last months in office of President Noynoy Aquino, son of the Mother of Asian Democracy, Corazon Aquino, the Philippines government expressed their wish to provide shelter for up to 3,000 "boat people" from Myanmar and Bangladesh. As a signatory to the 1951 Convention relating to the Status of Refugees, the country abides by the rules of international law and will provide assistance to refugees. Malacañang Palace also noted in a statement that this follows the country's harbouring and assistance to Vietnamese boat people fleeing from Vietnam in the late 1970s.

In 2017, the President of the Philippines Rodrigo Duterte, as the Chair of the ASEAN Summit, accepted Malaysia's rejection of an ASEAN statement condemning attacks on Myanmar security forces and all acts of violence which result in the loss of civilian lives, destruction of homes and the displacement of large numbers of people. Indonesia and Brunei were against the rejection. ASEAN, strongly upholds the principle in international law of noninterference in another country's domestic affairs, given Southeast Asia's long and traumatic experience of division along colonial lines.

In January 2018, Duterte revealed that he advised Myanmar's Suu Kyi to 'ignore human rights criticisms on Rohingya issue'.

On 5 April 2018, Duterte, unrestrained by his previous role as ASEAN Summit Chair, publicly recognized the existence of a genocide against the Rohingya. He told media that the Philippines is willing to shelter some Rohingya refugees, if Europe will also shelter some as well.

=== Poland ===
The Polish embassy in Myanmar has demanded humanitarian access to violence-affected areas of Rakhine State.

=== Portugal ===
The foreign ministry released a statement: "The Portuguese government calls for an immediate end to the violence and hopes Myanmar authorities can quickly guarantee conditions for reestablishing humanitarian access and, at the same time, ensuring the protection of the innocent civil population".

=== Russia ===
The Russian government condemned the Rohingya militant raids, "strongly condemn[ing] this armed raid aimed at undermining the efforts of Myanmar’s authorities and the international community to stabilise the situation in Rakhine State". President of Chechnya Ramzan Kadyrov led a rally of several thousand people in the Chechen capital, Grozny, in protest of Myanmar's discrimination against the Rohingya, and Kadyrov disavowed the Russian government position.

Just after the Kadyrov-led rally, Russian President Vladimir Putin condemned "the violence in Myanmar", including "violence against Muslims".

=== Saudi Arabia ===
According to the Saudi ambassador to the United Nations, "The Kingdom of Saudi Arabia has reached out to members of the Security Council to address the recent human rights violations against the Rohingya on its agenda. The Kingdom of Saudi Arabia has expressed its concern to the Secretary General". King Salman pledged US$15 million for Rohingya refugees in Bangladesh.

=== Singapore ===
The Singaporean foreign ministry urged calm and restraint by all sides in Rakhine State, pledging support for efforts by ASEAN to utilise existing mechanisms to provide humanitarian assistance to the affected people in Rakhine State in accordance with the principles of the ASEAN Charter. Singaporean Secretary for Home Affairs Amrin Amin announced on 19 October 2017 that his country would pledge S$100,000 through the ASEAN Humanitarian Assistance (AHA) centre to aid humanitarian efforts in Rakhine State.

=== Spain ===
The Spanish Embassy in Myanmar demanded humanitarian access for aid groups in Rakhine State.

=== South Africa ===
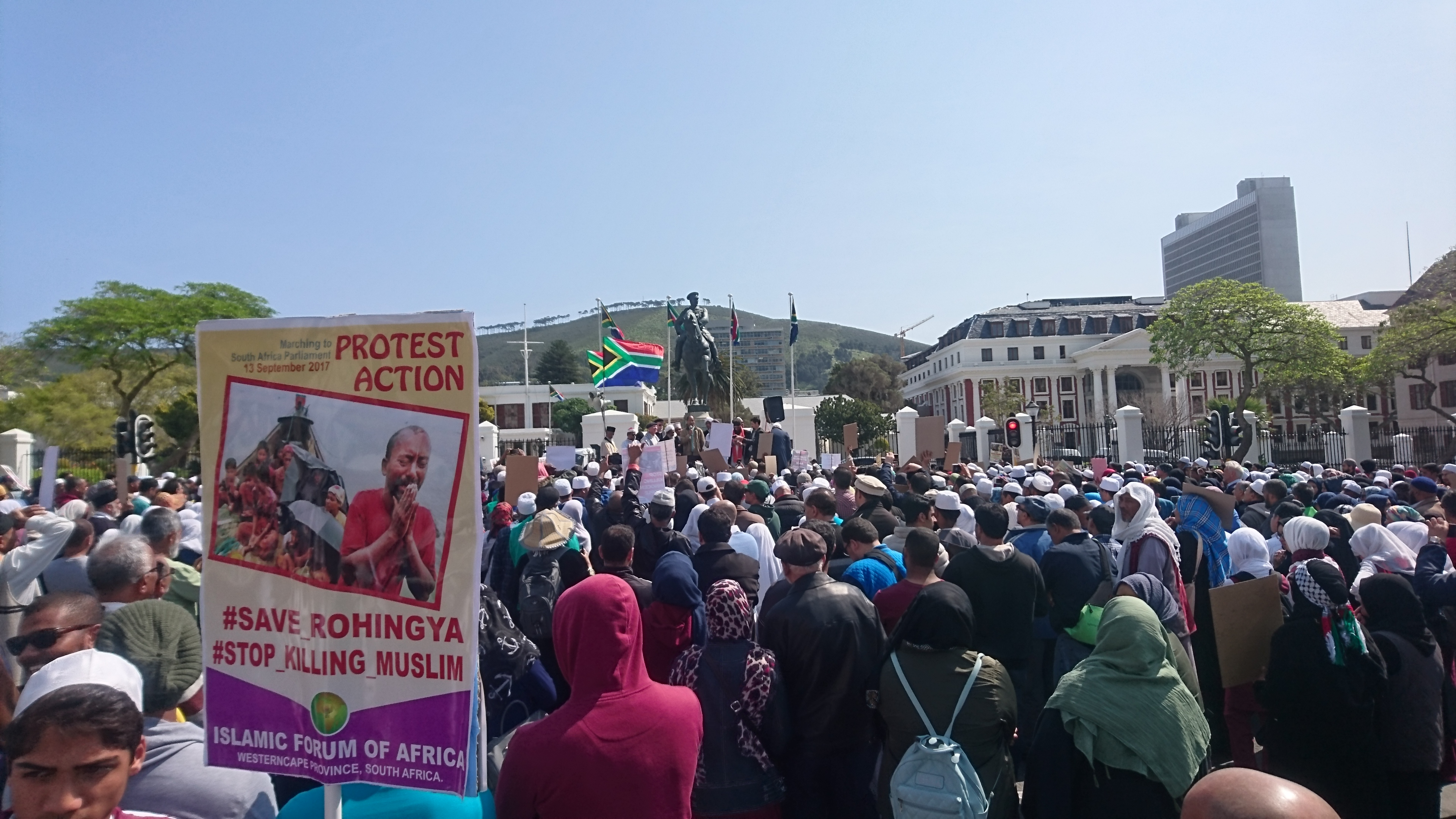
Protesters in Cape Town, South Africa calling for the protection of the Rohingya people in Myanmar.

Initially the South African government abstained from a United Nations General Assembly resolution condemning human rights violations against the Rohingya, thereby conforming with the position taken by other BRICS members at the time. This position was criticized by South African civil-society and protests were held in multiple South African cities condemning the genocide. and the country later voted in support of a UN resolution condemning Myanmar.

The South African government expressed concern over the violence in Rakhine State. South Africa sent aid and showed constant support toward the Rohingyas.

=== Sweden ===
Sweden demanded international humanitarian access to Rakhine State, and requested a closed-door meeting of the United Nations Security Council to discuss the "deteriorating situation" on 12 September 2017.

Swedish foreign minister Margot Wallström visited Rohingya refugee camps in Bangladesh.

=== Switzerland ===
Switzerland announced financial aid worth more than CHF 12 million for Rohingya refugees. President of the Swiss Confederation Alain Berset visited Rohingya refugee camps in Cox's Bazar, Bangladesh.

=== Turkey ===
Turkish President Recep Tayyip Erdogan described the Rohingya persecution as genocide. First Lady Emine Erdogan and Foreign Minister Mevlüt Çavuşoğlu flew to Bangladesh to visit Rohingya refugee camps, and Turkey pledged 1,000 tons of relief supplies.

Turkish Prime Minister Binali Yıldırım accused Myanmar of genocide while visiting Rohingya refugee camps in Cox's Bazar, Bangladesh.

=== Ukraine ===
At the United Nations, Ukraine's ambassador underscored that targeting of civilians and infringing upon their human rights are unacceptable and stressed that these actions can not be tolerated. Ukraine's ambassador emphasized that "Ukraine is seriously concerned by the continuously worsening humanitarian situation of hundreds of thousands of refugees and IDPs and stresses the need to ensure unhindered access of humanitarian actors to those in need."

=== United Arab Emirates ===
The UAE provided aid shipments to the United Nations High Commissioner for Refugees for the Rohingya people.

=== United Kingdom ===
By 13 September 2017, the United Kingdom had asked the United Nations Security Council to discuss the Rohingya crisis twice: on 29 August and 13 September. British Foreign Secretary Boris Johnson said in a statement,

Aung Sang Suu Kyi is rightly regarded as one of the most inspiring figures of our age but the treatment of the Rohingya is alas besmirching the reputation of Burma. She faces huge challenges in modernising her country. I hope she can now use all her remarkable qualities to unite her country, to stop the violence and to end the prejudice that afflicts both Muslims and other communities in Rakhine. It is vital that she receives the support of the Burmese military, and that her attempts at peacemaking are not frustrated. She and all in Burma will have our full support in this".

A statement by 157 members of Parliament read, "The scale of the human rights and humanitarian crisis unfolding in Myanmar is unprecedented in its recent history. It requires the attention of the British government at the highest level". On 14 November 2017, Mark Field stated that "What is happening there looks like ethnic cleansing", assigning responsibility for the humanitarian crisis to the Burmese military.

While visiting Bangladesh, Foreign Secretary Boris Johnson said "The plight of the Rohingya and the suffering they have had to endure is one of the most shocking humanitarian disasters of our time. This is a man-made tragedy that could be resolved with the right political will, tolerance and cooperation from all those involved". Johnson compared the Rohingya situation with the displacement of Palestinians in 1948. He visited Rohingya refugee camps in Cox's Bazar, Bangladesh.

In July 2020, Foreign Secretary Dominic Raab announce sanctions on 2 high-ranking Myanmar military generals who participated in the systematic and brutal violence against the Rohingya people and other ethnic minorities.

=== United States ===
On behalf of President Donald Trump, Vice President Mike Pence condemned the "terrible savagery" against the Rohingya: "The images of the violence and its victims have shocked the American people, and decent people all over the world". Pence called the Rohingya expulsion a "historic exodus" and a "great tragedy unfolding", saying that the situation may "sow seeds of hatred and chaos that may well consume the region for generations to come and threaten the peace of us all". The U.S. embassy in Yangon demanded humanitarian access to Rakhine State in December 2016. The State Department issued a statement on 9 September:

We are very concerned by the United Nations announcement on September 8 that an estimated 270,000 Rohingya have arrived in Bangladesh since August 25 following allegations of serious human rights abuses in Burma’s Rakhine State, including violent attacks and mass burnings of villages. We continue to coordinate closely with our partners, including the UN High Commissioner for Refugees, the International Committee of the Red Cross and the International Organization for Migration to provide emergency assistance to these individuals. Since October 2016, the U.S. government has provided nearly $63 million in humanitarian assistance for vulnerable communities displaced in and from Burma throughout the region. We applaud the government of Bangladesh’s generosity in responding to this humanitarian crisis and appreciate their continued efforts to ensure assistance reaches the affected population.

UN Ambassador Nikki Haley said that her government was "deeply troubled" by reports of atrocities. According to White House Press Secretary Sarah Huckabee Sanders President Trump was "aware and monitoring" the situation. Trump reportedly expressed outrage over the atrocities during a meeting with the Malaysian prime minister.

Senator John McCain announced moves to scrap planned future military cooperation with Myanmar, and the U.S. summoned the Myanmar ambassador on 13 September. Through September 2017, the U.S. government contributed $32 million in aid to Rohingya refugees fleeing Myanmar. Joseph Dunford, Chairman of the Joint Chiefs of Staff, told the Myanmar military: "This cannot continue".

U.S. Secretary of State Rex Tillerson, on 14 September 2017, said that Myanmar faces a "defining moment", adding:

"I think it is important that the global community speak out in support of what we all know the expectation is for the treatment of people regardless of their ethnicity... This violence must stop, this persecution must stop."

While visiting Rohingya refugee camps in Bangladesh, Sam Brownback, the United States Ambassador at Large for International Religious Freedom, stated "The president, vice-president, and congress are all watching the situation closely. They want justice for the Rohingyas. They want them to be able to go home. This issue has captured a lot of interest in the United States". Speaking of his conversations with refugees, Brownback said "Everybody that I spoke to today said that they believe their religion was the main reason behind the persecution they faced".

On March 21, 2022, Secretary of State Antony Blinken officially declared, at the United States Holocaust Memorial Museum, that the Burmese military had committed genocide and crimes against humanity.

=== Uzbekistan ===
The Uzbek foreign ministry demanded that Myanmar halt violence against the Rohingya.

== International organizations ==
- United Nations The UN has described Myanmar's actions as a "textbook example of ethnic cleansing". António Guterres, the United Nations Secretary General, said that "The grievances and unresolved plight of the Rohingya have festered for far too long and are becoming an undeniable factor in regional destabilisation". Zeid Ra'ad Al Hussein, the United Nations High Commissioner for Human Rights, said that "decades of persistent and systematic human rights violations, including the very violent security responses to the attacks since October 2016, have almost certainly contributed to the nurturing of violent extremism, with everyone ultimately losing". In December 2017, Zeid raised the possibility of Aung San Suu Kyi and Min Aung Hlaing facing an international indictment for crimes against humanity. He stated that "Given the scale of the military operation, clearly these would have to be decisions taken at a high enough level...And then there's the crime of omission. That if it came to your knowledge that this was being committed, and you did nothing to stop it, then you could be culpable as well for that.....the thresholds for proof are high....But it wouldn't surprise me in the future if a court were to make such a finding on the basis of what we see".
- European Union Federica Mogherini, the High Representative of the Union for Foreign Affairs and Security Policy, visited Rohingya refugee camps in Bangladesh and pledged continued support from the European Union.
- Organisation of Islamic Cooperation The Independent Human Rights Commission (IPHRC) of the OIC strongly condemned the human rights violations against the Rohingya.

Member states of the Commonwealth of Nations jointly called for the reintegration of Rohingya as equal members of Myanmar society

- Commonwealth of Nations At CHOGM 2018 in London, leaders of member states in the Commonwealth of Nations addressed the crisis in a joint communique, stating that "Heads expressed full solidarity with the Government and the people of Bangladesh affected by the influx of more than a million Rohingya from Rakhine State in Myanmar, and commended Bangladesh for providing shelter to the distressed community facing an existential threat. Heads called for a halt to all violence, a restoration of normality, and accountability of the perpetrators of gross violations of human rights through an independent process of investigation. They further called for the sustainable return of all such displaced Rohingya sheltered in Bangladesh to their rightful homes in Myanmar under UNHCR oversight and they called for the creation of the necessary conditions for sustainable return in safety, security and dignity. Heads also called for action to address the root causes of the current crisis, including through the immediate implementation of the Rakhine Advisory (Kofi Annan) Commission recommendation. Heads noted the general agreement and arrangements reached between the Governments of Bangladesh and Myanmar as a beginning towards the sustainable return of the Rohingya and their reintegration into Myanmar society as equal members".

=== International courts ===
The Rohingya genocide case in the International Court of Justice started with a request by The Gambia on 11 November 2019.

The International Criminal Court investigation in Bangladesh/Myanmar started on 14 November 2019. An arrest warrant for Min Aung Hlaing for crimes against humanity was requested on 27 November 2024.

== Other bodies ==
- World Jewish Congress president Ronald S. Lauder said in a statement that "The World Jewish Congress is extremely concerned by the plight of the Rohingya minority in Myanmar, who has suffered widespread persecution for years under the ruling military government and has been forced to flee in the hundreds of thousands in the past two weeks alone. The divisive, anti-minority rhetoric heard around the world today has the potential to escalate into ethnic violence, ethnic cleansing, and genocide, signs of which are already strongly taking shape in Myanmar. The Jewish people, who are far too often targeted with violence and bigotry, must not remain silent in the face of such extremism, no matter where or how it rears its head. The World Jewish Congress urges the international community to safeguard the rights of all minority communities, including those threatened by sectarian violence and oppression".
- United States Holocaust Museum released a statement saying it was "horrified by the ongoing attacks on Rohingya civilians in Rakhine State, western Burma, and calls on the Burmese government to immediately cease its military operations in the region. According to reports, this campaign includes the widespread and systematic targeting of Rohingya with killing, rape, torture, and forced displacement. The Museum reiterates its deep concern about these ongoing mass atrocities, including the risk of genocide".
- Tibet The Dalai Lama, the spiritual leader of the Tibetan government-in-exile, stated that "They should remember Buddha in such circumstances. Buddha would have definitely helped those poor Muslims. So, still I feel that it's so very sad, so sad".
- A joint statement by 12 Nobel laureates and 15 prominent citizens demanded the United Nations Security Council urgently address the situation and make an intervention if necessary, with all available options. The signatories included Muhammad Yunus, Betty Williams, Oscar Arias Sánchez, Shirin Ebadi, Tawakkol Karman, Archbishop Desmond Tutu, Jody Williams, Leymah Gbowee, Malala Yousafzai, Richard J. Roberts, Elizabeth Blackburn, Mairead Maguire, Syed Hamid Albar, Richard Branson, Mo Ibrahim, Alaa Murabit, Kasit Piromya, Paul Polman, Jeffrey D. Sachs, Jochen Zeitz, Emma Bonino, Gro Harlem Brundtland, Kerry Kennedy, Narayan Murthy, Surin Pitsuwan, Mary Robinson, Forest Whitaker, Shabana Azmi, Javed Akhtar and Asma Jahangir. The open letter stated:

We call on UNSC to intervene immediately by using all available means. We request you to take immediate action for cessation of indiscriminate military attack on innocent civilians that is forcing them to leave their home and flee country to turn into stateless people. The arguments that the Myanmar government is using to deny Rohingyas their citizenship are ludicrous, to say the least. At independence of Burma from the British in 1948 and under successive governments, Burma recognized the people of all ethnicities within its border, including the Rohingyas, as full citizens, having representation in the parliament. The military juntas in the 1980s decided that Rohingyas are not Burmese. Accordingly, they stripped the Rohingyas of their citizenship. They used military and political means to make sure that the Rohingyas leave the country. Systematic persecution aiming at ethnic and religious cleansing began....A bold change in approach is needed by United Nations and the international community if there is to be an end to the cycle of violence against the Rohingyas. The government of Myanmar needs to be told that international support and finance is conditional on a major change in policy towards the Rohingya. Propaganda and incitement of hatred and all violence, particularly state violence against Rohingyas must stop, discriminatory laws and policies must go, the recommendations of Kofi Annan's commission must be implemented immediately.

- Inter-Parliamentary Union adopted a resolution during its 137th Assembly in St. Petersburg stating "This resolution urges the global parliamentary community to take concrete steps to put an end to the ethnic cleansing of the Rohingya from Rakhine state, and to end further human rights violations...We cannot remain on the sidelines as one million people flee violence and persecution. This crisis is a major threat to regional peace and security". IPU Assembly President Valentina Matviyenko said "The resolution on the emergency item at this year’s Assembly was adopted by an overwhelming majority of the world’s parliamentarians, reflecting the concern of the entire global community over the situation". IPU Secretary General Martin Chungong said "The situation of the Rohingya is unacceptable. It is vital that parliamentarians from around the world stand together to condemn this atrocity".
- Commonwealth Parliamentary Association released a statement during its 63rd General Assembly in Dhaka which called "for urgent action from the international community to resolve the ongoing humanitarian crisis facing the Rohingyas ethnic minority".
