= 2008 Bangladesh–Myanmar naval standoff =

Territorial dispute

Bangladesh-Myanmar Naval standoff
Date	2–7 November 2008
Location	Northeastern Bay of Bengal. About 30 miles south of St. Martin's Island of Bangladesh.
Result	International mediation
Territorial changes	Dispute resolved at the International Tribunal for the Law of the Sea

Belligerents
Bangladesh	Myanmar

Commanders and leaders
Fakhruddin Ahmed; Sarwar Jahan Nizam	Than Shwe; Nyan Tun

Units involved
Bangladesh Armed Forces: Bangladesh Navy	Tatmadaw: Myanmar Navy

Strength
From first Day: 1 Frigate: BNS Abu Bakr; 1 Large Patrol Craft: BNS Madhumati; 1 Submarine chaser: BNS Nirbhoy; Later joined: 2 Missile boats	From first Day: 2 Warships; 4 ships from Daewoo for exploring oil and gas. Later joined: 2 Missile boats

The 2008 Bangladesh–Myanmar naval standoff was a naval conflict between the Bangladesh Navy and the Myanmar Navy over disputed territory in the northeastern Bay of Bengal. The standoff ended after diplomatic negotiations. In 2012, the two countries resolved their maritime boundary disputes at an international tribunal.

== Background ==
The Bay of Bengal has large untapped reserves of oil and natural gas. In November 2008, Myanmar allowed the South Korean company Daewoo to explore the seabed in an area 50 nautical miles southwest of Bangladesh's St. Martin's Island. The area was contested between Bangladesh and Myanmar as part of their respective exclusive economic zones.

== Standoff ==
Citing international law, Bangladesh asserted that Myanmar should not allow any kind of activities till a solution regarding the clear delimitation of the disputed territory is found. After Bangladeshi warnings were not heeded, the Bangladesh Navy deployed to the area three warships: the BNS Abu Bakr, BNS Madhumati and BNS Nirbhoy. Myanmar deployed at least two naval vessels.

== Negotiations ==
The Government of Bangladesh said Myanmar was operating well within the disputed territory. The Foreign Secretary of Bangladesh Towhid Hossain summoned the Myanmar ambassador and later himself flew to then capital of Myanmar, Yangon with a team of Bangladeshi diplomats. Iftekhar Ahmed Chowdhury, the interim Foreign Minister of Bangladesh, vowed that his country would protect its sovereignty, territory and national assets with "all necessary measures". There was no public statement from Myanmar.

== Withdrawal ==
On 7 November 2008, it was reported that Myanmar had withdrawn its vessels and Daewoo had begun to remove its equipment from the area.

== Arbitration ==
In 2009, Bangladesh submitted its claims to the International Tribunal for the Law of the Sea. Both countries came to terms at the tribunal in 2012.
