= Leopard-class frigate =

Class of frigate of the Royal Navy

Leopard class
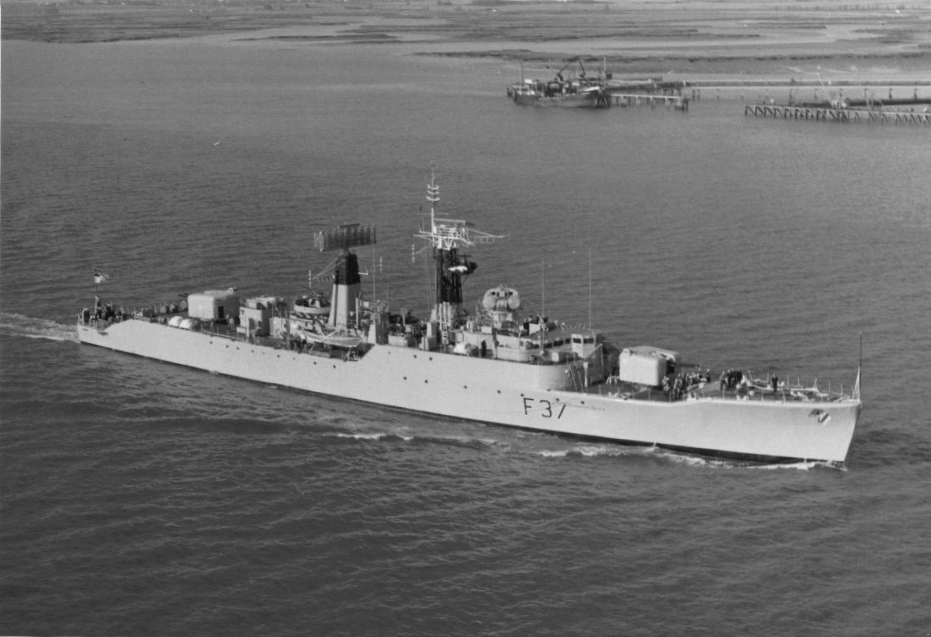
- HMS Jaguar

Class overview
- Name: Leopard class or Type 41
- Operators: Royal Navy; Indian Navy; Bangladesh Navy
- Built: 1953–1960
- In commission: 1957–1982 (British service); 1958–1992 (Indian service); 1978–2013 (Bangladesh service)
- Planned: 5 British & 3 Indian
- Completed: 4 British & 3 Indian
- Cancelled: 1 British
- Retired: 7

General characteristics
- Type: Air-defence frigate
- Displacement: 2,300 long tons (2,337 t) standard; 2,520 long tons (2,560 t) full load
- Length: 340 ft (100 m) o/a
- Beam: 40 ft (12 m)
- Draught: 16 ft (4.9 m)
- Propulsion: 8 × Admiralty Standard Range ASR1 diesels, 14,400 shp (10,738 kW), 2 shafts; 220 tons oil fuel
- Speed: 24 knots (28 mph; 44 km/h)
- Range: 7,500 nmi (13,900 km) at 16 kn (30 km/h)
- Complement: 205 or 235
- Sensors & processing systems: Type 960 air search radar, later; Type 965 AKE-1 air search radar; Type 293Q target indication radar, later; Type 993 target indication radar; Type 277Q height finding radar; Type 974 navigation radar; Type 275 fire control radar on director Mark 6M; Type 262 fire control radar on director CRBF; Type 262 fire control radar on STAAG mount; Type 1010 Cossor Mark 10 IFF; Type 174 search sonar; Type 164 attack sonar
- Armament: 2 × twin 4.5 in guns Mark 6; 1 × twin 40 mm Bofors gun STAAG Mark 2, later; 1 × single 40 mm Bofors gun Mark 9; 1 × Squid A/S mortar

The Type 41 or Leopard class were a class of anti-aircraft defence frigates built for the Royal Navy (four ships) and Indian Navy (three ships) in the 1950s. The Type 41, together with the Type 61 variant, introduced diesel propulsion into the Royal Navy, the perceived benefits being long range, low fuel use, reduced crew (especially skilled artificers), and reduced complexity.

Although successful, improvements in traditional steam turbine technology erased the fuel economy advantage of the diesel powerplants and led to production being curtailed in favour of the Type 12 frigate, which was similar in overall design.

== Design ==
These ships were designed to provide anti-aircraft escorts to convoys and amphibious groups and act as light destroyers on detached duties. They were not intended to operate with fleet carrier task forces which had speeds of over 28 knots and were escorted by destroyers and similar vessels, and therefore made only 24 knots (44 km/h). They were envisioned in late World War II and immediately after as part of a 1945 project for anti-submarine, anti-aircraft, and Aircraft Direction frigates which would all share a common hull and propulsion, and the design of the Type 41 was completed by December 1947.

Like the 1950 RAN Battle-class variant (actually the Royal Navy variant, for war emergency production) and the unbuilt 1942 two-turret RN G destroyer, which the 1944 common hull escort closely resembles (shipyards building the Type 41, like Dennys Glasgow yard, had been provided with the full 1944 Gallant-class plans), the Type 41 Leopard class used the latest twin semi-auto 4.5" Mk6 turrets. This meant that, unlike other post-war frigates, the Type 41 had a full destroyer armament of two twin 4.5" Mk6 gun turrets, giving them a more powerful armament than the Battle- or Weapon-class destroyers.

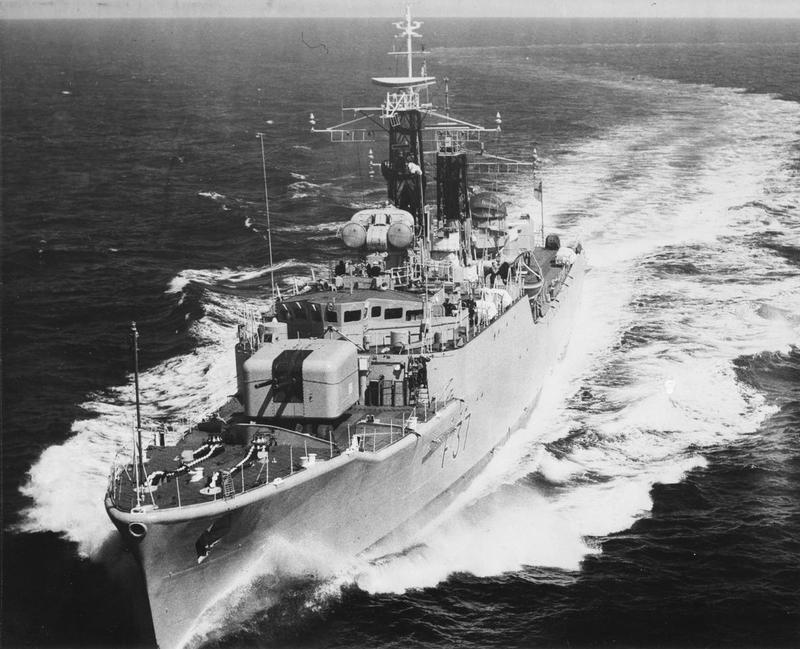
Jaguar underway

The first production orders were in the 1951/2 and 1952/3 programmes. In 1953 eleven additional Type 41s, also with "cat" names like Cougar and Cheetah, were planned, together with ten Type 61 (Salisbury-class) frigates, with which they shared a common hull and machinery.

Distinct from the Type 61, the Type 41 radar fit also supported surface fighting, whereas the radar fit of the Type 61 "Aircraft Direction" (AD) frigates was, when introduced, largely identical to the reconstructed Dido-class AD cruiser Royalist. To that end, HMS Leopard carried navigation radar, the new Type 992 for long-range surface target indication, and the Type 960M for Long Range Air Warning; the Type 61 had four dedicated systems: types 293, 977M, 960M and 982M.

An intended A/S version, the Type 11 (see Type system of the Royal Navy), was cancelled as the low (24-knot) top speed was insufficient for accompanying fast carrier task forces, particularly HMS Eagle, the flagship, commissioned in 1951. However, in practice, frigates and destroyers moving at more than 25 knots create turbulence which blinds their own sonars and can only engage fast-moving subs by using a helicopter with its own sonar. Thus the Type 41s were still fitted with the best late-1950s RN sonars, types 170 and 174 (which remained a good passive sonar into the 1970s), but were equipped with only a minimal A/S mortar battery.

Through their diesel propulsion, the Type 41s achieved long range through their low fuel use. The ships had a total of twelve Admiralty Standard Range Mk.1 (ASR1) diesel engines disposed four-each in three engine rooms. In the fore and aft engine rooms, two engines were connected to the drive shafts by fluid clutches and reduction gearboxes, while the other two were not connected to the shafts, but instead drove 360 kW alternators to provide electrical power. In the centre engine room, all four engines were connected to the shafts. Jaguar was fitted with controllable-pitch propellers. Initially the diesel engines proved somewhat unreliable, but these teething troubles were gradually overcome and reliability eventually became very satisfactory.

The Leopard class was also fitted with an early type of hydraulic stabiliser system consisting of two fins that could be extended outside the main hull, to port and starboard, from a compartment between the two engine rooms. Gyro controlled with a relatively simple control system, they proved very effective in use. During testing every three months at sea, the ship could be easily driven into a 20°+ roll from the manual control on the bridge. Prior warning had to be given over the ship's tannoy system before testing was carried out, to allow stowage of loose items. A slight reduction in top speed was also noticed when in use.

However, by 1955 success had been achieved, with difficulty and limitations, in developing new steam turbines giving 30-knot speed and the range to take convoys across the Atlantic, embodied in the Whitby-class Type 12 frigates. As a result, the orders for the new diesel-electric frigates were cancelled, changed to orders for Type 12, or sold to India.

Within a few years of the Type 41's introduction in the late 1950s they were regarded as obsolete for their intended function as anti-aircraft convoy escorts. This was emphasized when the planned replacement of the 4.5" guns with 3"/70 AA guns was abandoned (in January 1955) due to cost and the view that AA guns were obsolete against jets and missiles. The addition of power-ramming for the twin 4.5" guns, intended to boost the rate of fire from 14rpm to 24rpm, failed. Replacement of the unreliable STAAG 40mm Bofors gun mount by Seacat surface to air missiles was cancelled on economic grounds, and the guns eventually replaced by a single, manually operated Bofors gun. Replacement of the experimental version of the fast rotating 992 target indicators with the slower standard 993 was also abandoned. Only a short range 262 radar MRS1 provided secondary AA fire control for the main armament.

== Service ==
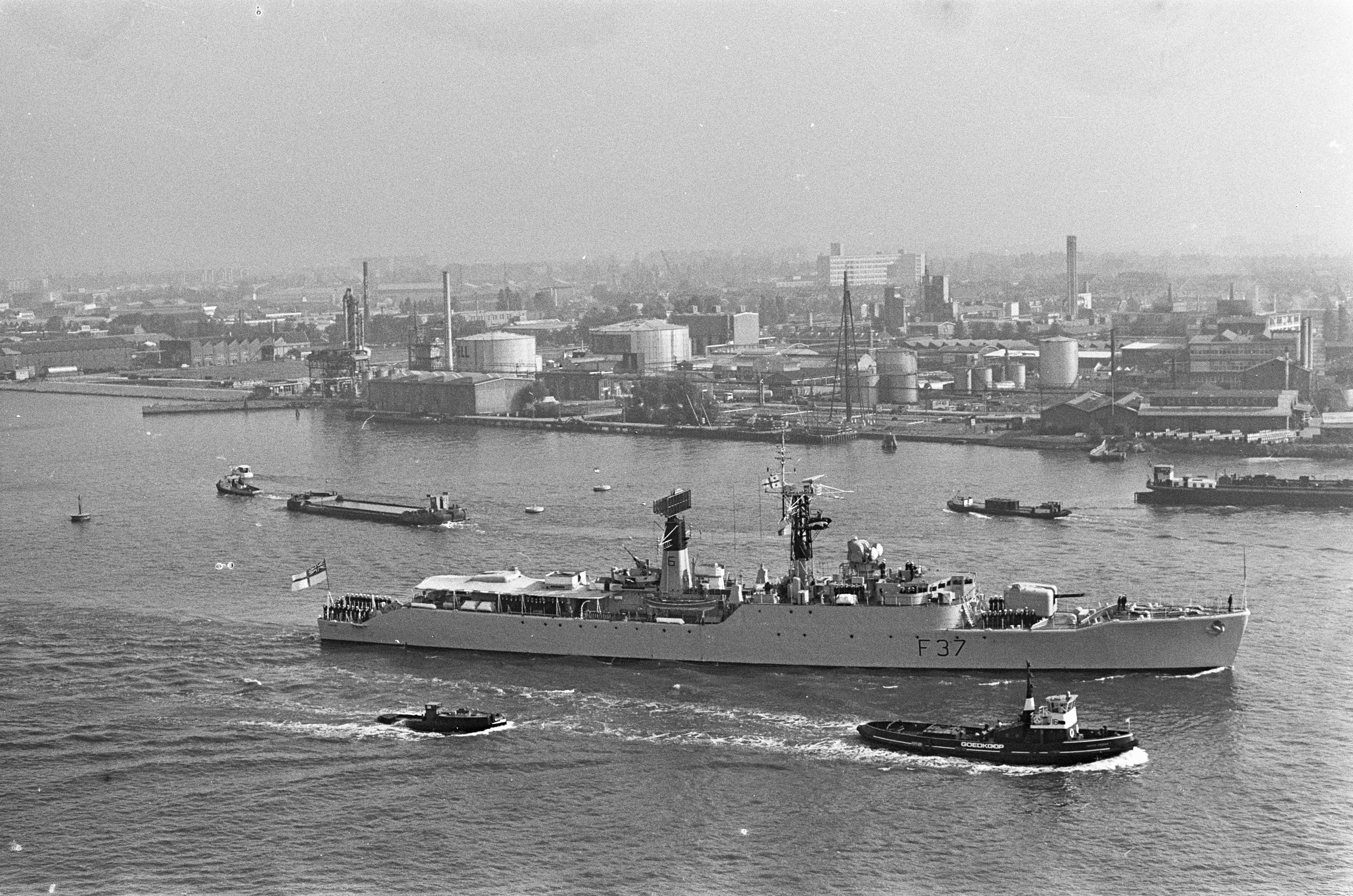
Jaguar in Amsterdam, 1968

In service, the Leopard class were used mainly as patrol frigates, notably on the South American station, where their long range and destroyer-like appearance were particularly advantageous. Operating out of Simonstown naval base in South Africa, they in part replaced the Dido-class cruisers HMS Euryalus and Cleopatra usually deployed on these duties during 1946–1954. It was hoped that a pair of Type 41s with four twin 4.5-inch guns would between them be adequate to deter a single Russian Sverdlov-class cruiser, which British Naval Intelligence saw as having been in part conceived of to threaten trade routes from Buenos Aires to Britain. Later they were extensively used in the Far East during the 1963–68 confrontation with Indonesia over Borneo and Malaysia, for which all-gun-armed Type 41s were again well suited. In the 1970s they saw service on Cod War duties.

In 1971 it was decided not to refit HMS Puma again; purchasing the half-sister of the class, the former Black Star ordered by Ghana, and commissioning it as HMS Mermaid would cost less than the refit. HMS Leopard finished its service in the 1975–1976 Cod War, having given an Icelandic gunboat a 30-second warning that it would open fire with its 4.5-inch guns. HMS Lynx was the last of the class to remain operational and attended the Spithead fleet review in 1977. HMS Jaguar was reactivated from the standby squadron for the Third Cod War, but sprang too many leaks on the voyage to Iceland and returned to Chatham.

HMS Jaguar and HMS Lynx were sold to the Bangladesh Navy in 1978 and March 1982 respectively. Had they been retained a few more years they could have been ideal during the Falklands War for specialised bombardment and the air defence of ships unloading in San Carlos Water. The destroyers and frigates remaining in RN service in 1982 had only one gun turret, the new 4.5 inch Mk.8 often jammed, and those with the Mk.6 twin 4.5 inch (which required 40–45 men required for each turret) rarely even test fired the guns. As it was, the Bangladesh Navy found the Leopard-class satisfactory and the ships were active until they were retired in 2013.

== Construction programme ==
Pennant	Name	(a) Hull builder (b) Main machinery manufacturers	Ordered	Laid down	Launched	Accepted into service	Commissioned	Estimated building cost	Fate
F14	HMS Leopard	(a) HM Dockyard, Portsmouth (b) Vickers Armstrong (Engineers) Ltd, Barrow-in-Furness (b) Peter Brotherhood Limited, Peterborough	21 August 1951	25 March 1953	23 May 1955	December 1958	30 September 1958	£3,545,000	Paid off for last time 12 December 1975. Broken up 1977.
F27	HMS Lynx	(a) John Brown and Co Ltd, Clydebank (b) Crossley Brothers Ltd, Manchester (b) British Polar Engines Ltd, Glasgow	28 June 1951	13 August 1953	12 January 1955	14 March 1957	14 March 1957	£2,720,000	Sold to Bangladesh 12 March 1982, renamed BNS Abu Bakr. Decommissioned 22 January 2013.
F34	HMS Puma	(a) Scotts Shipbuilding and Engineering Co Ltd, Greenock (b) HM Dockyard, Chatham (b) British Polar Engines Ltd, Glasgow	28 June 1951	16 November 1953	30 June 1954	April 1957	27 April 1957	£2,914,000	Paid off for last time June 1972. Broken up 1976.
F37	HMS Jaguar	(a) Wm Denny Bros Ltd, Dumbarton (b) Crossley Bros Ltd, Manchester	28 June 1951	2 November 1953	20 July 1957	December 1959	12 December 1959	£3,772,000	Sold to Bangladesh 6 July 1978 for £2 million, renamed BNS Ali Haider. Decommissioned 22 January 2013.
F34	INS Brahmaputra (ex-HMS Panther)	(a) John Brown and Co Ltd, Clydebank	1954	20 October 1955	13 March 1957		31 March 1958		Ordered HMS Panther, but transferred to India 1953. Decommissioned 30 June 1986. Broken Up 1986.
F37	INS Beas	(a) Vickers Armstrongs (Shipbuilders) Ltd, Newcastle upon Tyne	1954	29 November 1956	9 October 1958		24 May 1960		Decommissioned 22 December 1992. Broken up 1992.
F38	INS Betwa	(a) Vickers Armstrongs (Shipbuilders) Ltd, Newcastle upon Tyne	1954	29 May 1957	15 September 1959		8 December 1960		Decommissioned 31 December 1991. Broken Up 1988.

A fifth Royal Navy vessel, HMS Panther was ordered twice. The first was transferred to India in 1953 before being laid down, a replacement was cancelled in 1957, before being laid down.
