= BNS Durjoy (1982) =

Bangladesh Submarine

History

Bangladesh
- Name: BNS Durjoy
- Commissioned: 10 September 1982
- Decommissioned: 1995
- In service: 1982-1995
- Status: Damaged

General characteristics
- Class & type: Type 037-class submarine chaser
- Displacement: 400 tonnes
- Length: 58.8 m (192 ft 11 in)
- Beam: 7.2 m (23 ft 7 in)
- Draught: 2.2 m (7 ft 3 in)
- Propulsion: 4 × Diesel engine, 4,000 hp (3,000 kW) 4 × shafts
- Speed: 30.5 knots (56.5 km/h)
- Range: 1,300 nmi (2,400 km) at 15 knots
- Complement: 70 personnel
- Sensors & processing systems: 1 × Pot Head surface search radar; 1 × SJD-3 telescoping high frequency active sonar
- Armament: 2 x twin 57mm 70-cal Type 76 DP guns; 2 x twin 25mm 60cal Type 61 guns; 4 x RBU-1200 (Type 81) (5-barrel) ASW rockets; 2 x depth charge rails with 18 depth charges
- Notes: Pennant Number: P 811

BNS Durjoy was a Type 037-class submarine chaser of the Bangladesh Navy, where she served from 1982 to 1995.

== Design ==
Powered by four 4,000 horsepower (3,000 kW) PCR/Kolomna Type 9-D-8 diesel engines that drive four propellers, Durjoy had a maximum speed of 30.5 knots (56.5 km/h; 35.1 mph). She had a range of 1,300 nautical miles (2,400 km; 1,500 mi) at 15 knots (28 km/h; 17 mph).

=== Armament ===
The ship's primary armament consisted of two twin 57 mm guns. Anti-aircraft armament consisted of two twin 25 mm guns. For anti-submarine warfare (ASW), she was equipped with four RBU-1200 anti-submarine rocket launchers and two depth charge racks with 18 depth charges. She could carry up to 12 mines.

=== Electronics ===
Durjoy was equipped with one Pot Head radar for surface search. For ASW operations, she uses Chinese SJD-3 telescoping high frequency active sonar. Instead of being fixed to the hull, SJD-3 has a telescoping arm, so when not in use, the sonar is stored in the hull, and when deployed, the sonar is lowered into water several meter below the hull, thus increasing the detection range by avoiding buffeting generated by the hull.

== Career ==
The ship was purchased for 232 million Bangladeshi taka ($11.5M in 1982).

She was commissioned into the Bangladesh Navy as Durjoy on 10 September 1982. She was based at Chittagong, as part of Escort Squadron 81.

Durjoy was damaged in the April 1991 Bangladesh cyclone and was subsequently repaired.

In 1995, she was damaged beyond repair. After serving the Bangladesh Navy for about twelve years, the ship was decommissioned.

== See also ==
- List of historic ships of the Bangladesh Navy
- BNS Nirbhoy
