= BNS Ali Haider (1978) =

Anti-aircraft frigate of the Bangladesh Navy

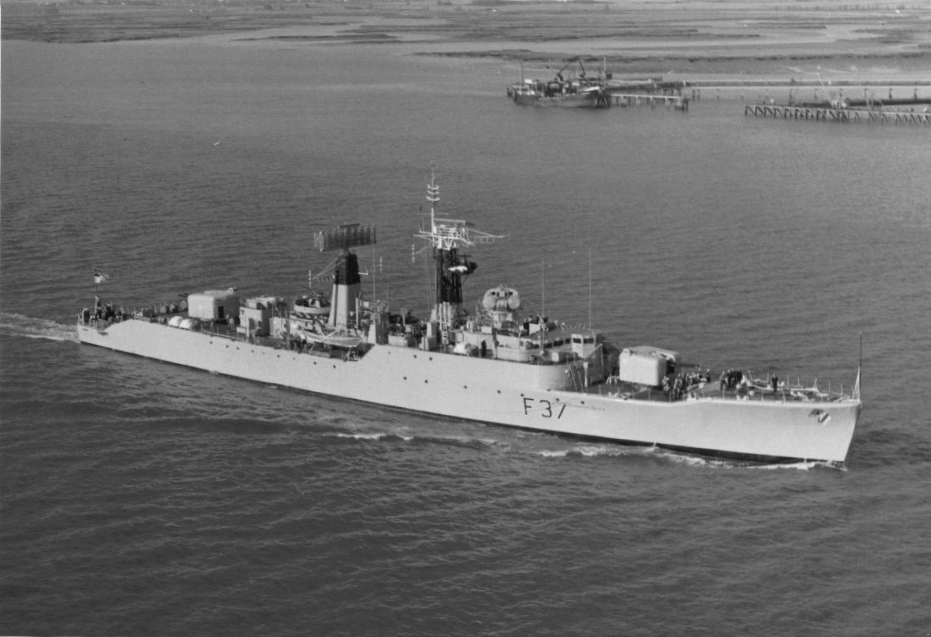
- BNS Ali Haider as HMS Jaguar before transfer to Bangladesh Navy

History

Bangladesh
- Name: BNS Ali Haider
- Builder: William Denny and Brothers
- Laid down: 2 November 1953
- Launched: 20 July 1957
- Acquired: 6 July 1978
- Decommissioned: 22 January 2014
- Identification: Pennant number: F 17
- Fate: Scrapped

General characteristics
- Class & type: Leopard-class frigate
- Length: 101 m (331.4 ft)
- Beam: 10.6 m (34.8 ft)
- Draught: 3 m (9.8 ft)
- Propulsion: 2 × type 12 E 390V diesels; 14,400 hp (10,700 kW) sustained; 2 shafts
- Speed: 18 knots (33 km/h; 21 mph)
- Range: 2,200 miles (3,500 km) at 18 kts
- Complement: 200 (22 officers)
- Sensors & processing systems: Radar System: Surface/Air search: Type 960; Air search: Type 965 AKE-1; Type 993 target indication radar; Height finder: Type 277Q; Navigation: Type 974; Fire control: Type 285 on director Mark 6M; Sonar system: Type 174 search sonar; Type 164 attack sonar
- Armament: 2 × twin 4.5 in guns Mark 6; 1 × twin 40 mm Bofors gun STAAG Mark 2; 1 × single 40 mm Bofors gun Mark 9; 1 × Squid A/S mortar

BNS Ali Haider was a Leopard-class Type 41 anti-aircraft frigate of the Bangladesh Navy. She served in the Bangladesh Navy from 1978 to 2014. The ship was named after the fourth Rashidun Caliph Ali.

== History ==
BNS Ali Haider previously served the British Royal Navy as HMS Jaguar. She was laid down by William Denny and Brothers on 2 November 1953 and launched on 20 July 1957. She was commissioned by the Royal Navy on 12 December 1959. She underwent a major refit in the mid-1960s that replaced her sensors and electronic warfare systems. On 6 July 1978, she was sold to the Bangladesh Navy.

== Career ==
BNS Ali Haider was commissioned into the Bangladesh Navy on 6 July 1978. She served under Commodore Commanding Bangladesh Navy Flotilla (COMBAN). After serving in the Bangladesh Navy for about 36 years and an overall total of 55 years of service, the ship was decommissioned on 22 January 2014 and scrapped. She was replaced by BNS Ali Haider (2014), a Chinese-built Type 053H2 frigate with the same name and pennant number.

== See also ==
- List of historic ships of the Bangladesh Navy
