= Operation Dragon King =

1978 military operation in Arakan, Burma

- Part of the Rohingya conflict
- Rohingya villagers rounded up by Burmese soldiers and immigration officials
- Planned by: Socialist government of Ne Win
- Objective: Register citizens in northern Arakan; Expel so-called "foreigners" (i.e. Rohingyas) from the area
- Date: 6 February – 31 July 1978 (5 months, 3 weeks and 4 days)
- Executed by: Tatmadaw, Burmese immigration officials
- Outcome: Massive humanitarian crisis in neighbouring Bangladesh
- Casualties: 200,000–250,000 fled to Bangladesh (180,000 later repatriated)

Operation Dragon King (Burmese: နဂါးမင်း စစ်ဆင်ရေး), officially known as Operation Nagamin, was a military operation carried out in 1978 by the Tatmadaw (Myanmar Armed Forces) and immigration officials in northern Arakan, Burma (present-day Rakhine State, Myanmar), during the socialist rule of Ne Win.

== Background ==
The Rohingya people are an ethnic minority that live in northern Arakan, Burma (present-day Rakhine State, Myanmar), who have suffered historical persecution by the Burmese government and Buddhist majority. After General Ne Win and his Burma Socialist Programme Party (BSPP) seized power in a coup in 1962, the government systematically dissolved Rohingya political and social organizations. The end of the liberation war in neighbouring Bangladesh strengthened the Burmese government's fears of "foreign invaders" infiltrating their country. Therefore in 1977, the government began its preparations for Operation Dragon King, which commenced early the following year.

== Events ==
The official purpose of Operation Dragon King was to register citizens in northern Arakan and expel so-called "foreigners" from the area prior to a national census. Immigration officials and military personnel conducted the operation together, with the latter being accused by Rohingya refugees of forcibly evicting villagers through intimidation, rape and murder.

The operation began on 6 February 1978, beginning in the village of Sakkipara in the Sittwe District, where there were mass round ups of civilians. In the span of over three months, approximately 200,000 to 250,000 refugees, mostly Rohingya Muslims, fled to Bangladesh. The government of Burma estimated that 150,000 fled during the operation, and proclaimed that the mass exodus signified that Rohingyas were in-fact "illegal immigrants". The International Committee of the Red Cross (ICRC) and the government of Bangladesh provided emergency relief to the refugees, but were overwhelmed by the magnitude of the humanitarian crisis. Bangladesh requested assistance from the United Nations, and a UNHCR relief mission was sent to the region.

On 31 July 1978, the governments of Burma and Bangladesh reached an agreement regarding the repatriation of Rohingya refugees, and 180,000 returned to Burma following the agreement.

== See also ==
- Operation Clean and Beautiful Nation
