= Operation Clean and Beautiful Nation =

1991–1992 military operation in western Myanmar

- Part of the Rohingya conflict
Date	1991–1992
Location	Northern Rakhine State; Bangladesh–Myanmar border
Result	Burmese tactical failure: Failure to disarm and expel RSO insurgents; Brief strain in Bangladesh–Myanmar relations in December 1991

Belligerents
Myanmar (SLORC)	Rohingya Solidarity Organisation

Commanders and leaders
Saw Maung	Muhammad Yunus

Casualties and losses
- 200,000–250,000 displaced (150,000 later repatriated)

Operation Clean and Beautiful Nation (Burmese: ပြည်သာယာ စစ်ဆင်ရေး), officially known as Operation Pyi Thaya in English, was a military operation conducted by the Tatmadaw (Myanmar Armed Forces) in northern Rakhine State, near Myanmar's border with Bangladesh. The operation took place in 1991 and 1992, under the military junta of the State Law and Order Restoration Council (SLORC), officially as a response to the military expansion of the Rohingya Solidarity Organisation (RSO).

Similar to Operation Nagamin (Operation Dragon King) in 1978, the government's official explanation for the operation was to expel so-called "foreigners" from the area, as well as capturing RSO insurgents. The resulting violence however, resulted in 200,000 to 250,000 civilians being displaced (most of whom fled to neighbouring Bangladesh) and failed to prevent further attacks by the RSO, which continued until the end of the 1990s.

In December 1991, Tatmadaw soldiers crossed the border and accidentally fired on a Bangladeshi military outpost, causing a brief strain in Bangladesh–Myanmar relations.
