= BNS Abu Bakr (1982) =

Frigate of the Bangladesh Navy

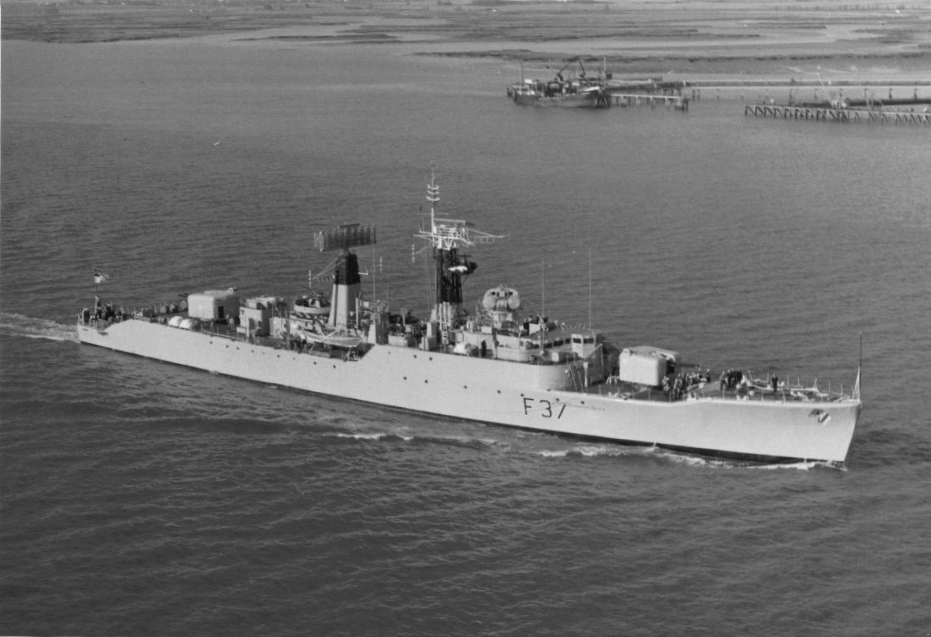
- Her sister ship BNS Ali Haider

History

Bangladesh
- Name: BNS Abu Bakr
- Builder: John Brown and Company
- Laid down: 13 August 1953
- Launched: 12 January 1955
- Acquired: 12 March 1982
- Decommissioned: 22 January 2014
- In service: 1982-2014
- Identification: Pennant number F 15
- Fate: Scrapped

General characteristics
- Class & type: Leopard-class frigate
- Length: 101 metres (331 ft)
- Beam: 10.6 metres (35 ft)
- Draught: 3 metres (9.8 ft)
- Propulsion: 2 × type 12 E 390V diesels; 14,400 hp (m) (10.6MW) sustained; 2 shafts
- Speed: 18 knots (33 km/h; 21 mph)
- Range: 2,200 miles (3,500 km) at 18 kts
- Complement: 200 (22 officers)
- Sensors & processing systems: Radar System: Surface/Air search: Type 960; Air search: Type 965 AKE-1; Type 993 target indication radar; Height finder: Type 277Q; Navigation: Type 974; Fire control: Type 285 on director Mark 6M; Sonar system: Type 174 search sonar; Type 164 attack sonar
- Armament: 2 × twin 4.5 in guns Mark 6; 1 × twin 40 mm Bofors gun STAAG Mark 2; 1 × single 40 mm Bofors gun Mark 9; 1 × Squid A/S mortar

BNS Abu Bakr was a Leopard-class Type 41 anti-aircraft frigate of Bangladesh Navy. She served Bangladesh Navy from 1982 to 2014. The ship was named after the first Rashidun Caliph Abu Bakr.

== History ==
BNS Abu Bakr previously served the 7th Frigate Squadron of the Royal Navy as HMS Lynx. The frigate was laid down by John Brown and Company, Clydebank, Scotland, on 13 August 1953, and launched on 12 January 1955. She was commissioned into the Royal Navy on 14 March 1957. On 12 March 1982, she was transferred to the Bangladesh Navy.

== Career ==
BNS Abu Bakr joined the Bangladesh Navy fleet on 12 March 1982. She served under Commodore Commanding BN Flotilla (COMBAN). About 200 personnel served aboard Abu Bakr, with most living aboard her.

In November 2008, BNS Abu Bakr along with BNS Nirbhoy and BNS Madhumati intercepted Myanmar Navy ships in a disputed region of the Bay of Bengal where they were supporting exploration for oil and gas.

After serving the Bangladesh Navy for about 32 years and a total of 57 years of service life, the ship was decommissioned on 22 January 2014, and eventually scrapped. She was replaced by BNS Abu Bakr (2014), a Chinese Type 053H2 frigate with the same name and pennant number.

== See also ==
- List of historic ships of the Bangladesh Navy
