= HMS Jaguar (F37) =

1959 Type 41 or Leopard-class frigate of the Royal Navy

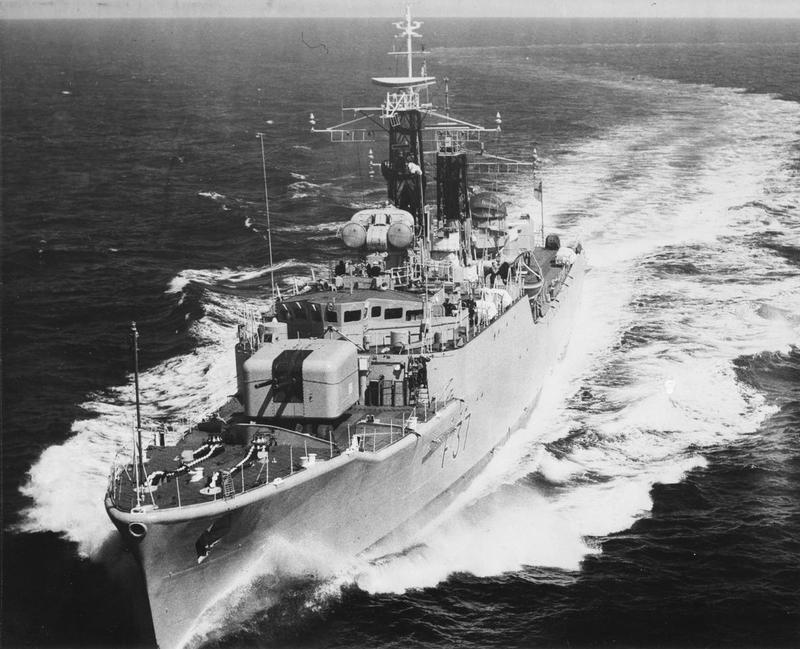
- HMS Jaguar in 1963

History

United Kingdom
- Name: HMS Jaguar
- Ordered: 28 June 1951
- Builder: William Denny & Brothers
- Laid down: 2 November 1953
- Launched: 20 July 1957
- Commissioned: 12 December 1959
- Identification: F37
- Fate: Sold to Bangladesh 1978

General characteristics
- Class & type: Leopard-class frigate
- Length: 101 m (331 ft 4 in)
- Beam: 10.6 m (34 ft 9 in)
- Draught: 3 m (9 ft 10 in)
- Propulsion: Eight ASR1 V16 Diesels, feeding two gearboxes with Vulcan Sinclair Couplings to 2 shafts. Crossley?
- Speed: 18 knots (33 km/h)
- Range: 2,200 nmi (4,074 km; 2,532 mi) at 18 kn
- Complement: 200 (22 (app.) officers)
- Sensors & processing systems: Radar System: Surface: 293/993; Air & Surface: 965; Navigation: 974/978; Fire control: 275; Echo Type 3 (Hull mounted)
- Armament: 2 × twin Mark 6 4.5 in (114 mm) guns; 1 × Squid A/S mortar

HMS Jaguar (F37), was a Leopard-class Type 41 anti-aircraft frigate of the British Royal Navy, named after the jaguar. Jaguar was the last frigate built by William Denny & Brothers for the Royal Navy. Unlike the rest of her class, she was fitted with controllable pitch propellers.

== Royal Navy service ==
The main armament originally consisted of two twin 4.5 in guns Mark 6 plus one twin STAAG mounting, which was soon replaced by a 40 mm gun. She was refitted in the mid-1960s, replacing the Type 960 long-range air warning radar with Type 965. The lattice mainmast was replaced by a plated structure to support the heavier AKE1 aerial used by the Type 965. The Type 293Q target designation radar on the foremast was replaced by a Type 993. New ESM and SCCM equipment was installed on the foremast. It was intended that Seacat missile would replace the 40 mm gun but this was not done to save money.

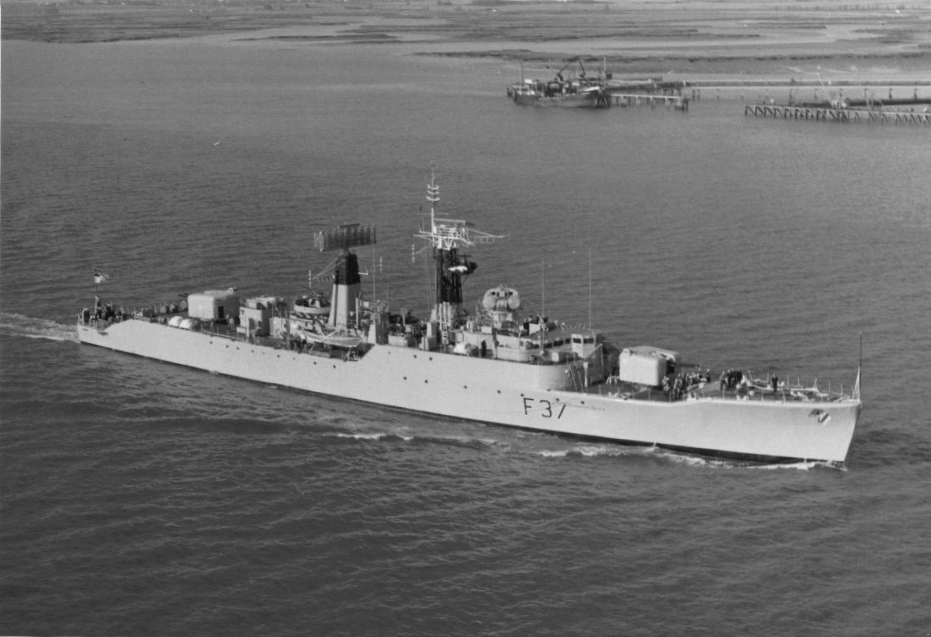
HMS Jaguar after she was refitted with Type 965 radar

Jaguar sailed from Chatham Dockyard in January 1969 and undertook a world cruise calling at Gibraltar, South Africa, Mombasa, Singapore, Hong Kong, New Zealand, Australia, Tasmania, Fiji, Tonga, Raratonga, Tahiti, Pitcairn, Panama and Florida. During this cruise she provided medical aid at Astove, in the Seychelles. She arrived back in the UK in December 1969 and was deployed to Icelandic waters for the Second Cod War in 1973. On 10 September 1973, she collided with the Icelandic gunboat Thor (Þór), and had her bows damaged. She spent the rest of the month on dry dock for repairs at Chatham. She was then assigned to the standby squadron but was recommissioned in 1976 for service in Icelandic waters again for the Third Cod War. To protect her bows and stern from damage from collisions with Icelandic gunboats, she was fitted with heavy wooden sheathing.

== Bangladesh Navy service ==
After a spell in reserve, she was sold on 6 July 1978 to the Bangladesh Navy for £2 million and commissioned in 1978 as BNS Ali Haider (F17). Ali Haider was decommissioned during a ceremony held in her home port of Chittagong on 22 January 2014. Name and number were taken by one of the two former Chinese Jianghu III-class frigates which reportedly had already begun their transfer voyage.

== See also ==
- List of ships built by William Denny and Brothers

== Publications ==
- Colledge, J. J.; Warlow, Ben (2006) [1969]. Ships of the Royal Navy: The Complete Record of All Fighting Ships of the Royal Navy from the 15th Century to the Present (3rd Rev ed.). London: Chatham Publishing. ISBN 978-1-86176-281-8. OCLC 67375475.
- Critchley, Mike (1992). British Warships Since 1945: Part 5: Frigates. Liskeard, UK: Maritime Press. ISBN 0-907771-13-0.
- Friedman, Norman (2008). British Destroyers & Frigates: The Second World War and After. Barnsley, UK: Seaforth Publishing. ISBN 978-1-84832-015-4.
- Marriott, Leo (1983). Royal Navy Frigates 1945–1983. Shepperton, Surrey, UK: Ian Allan Publishing. ISBN 0-7110-1322-5.

== See also ==
- List of ships of the Bangladesh Navy
