= BNS Madhumati =

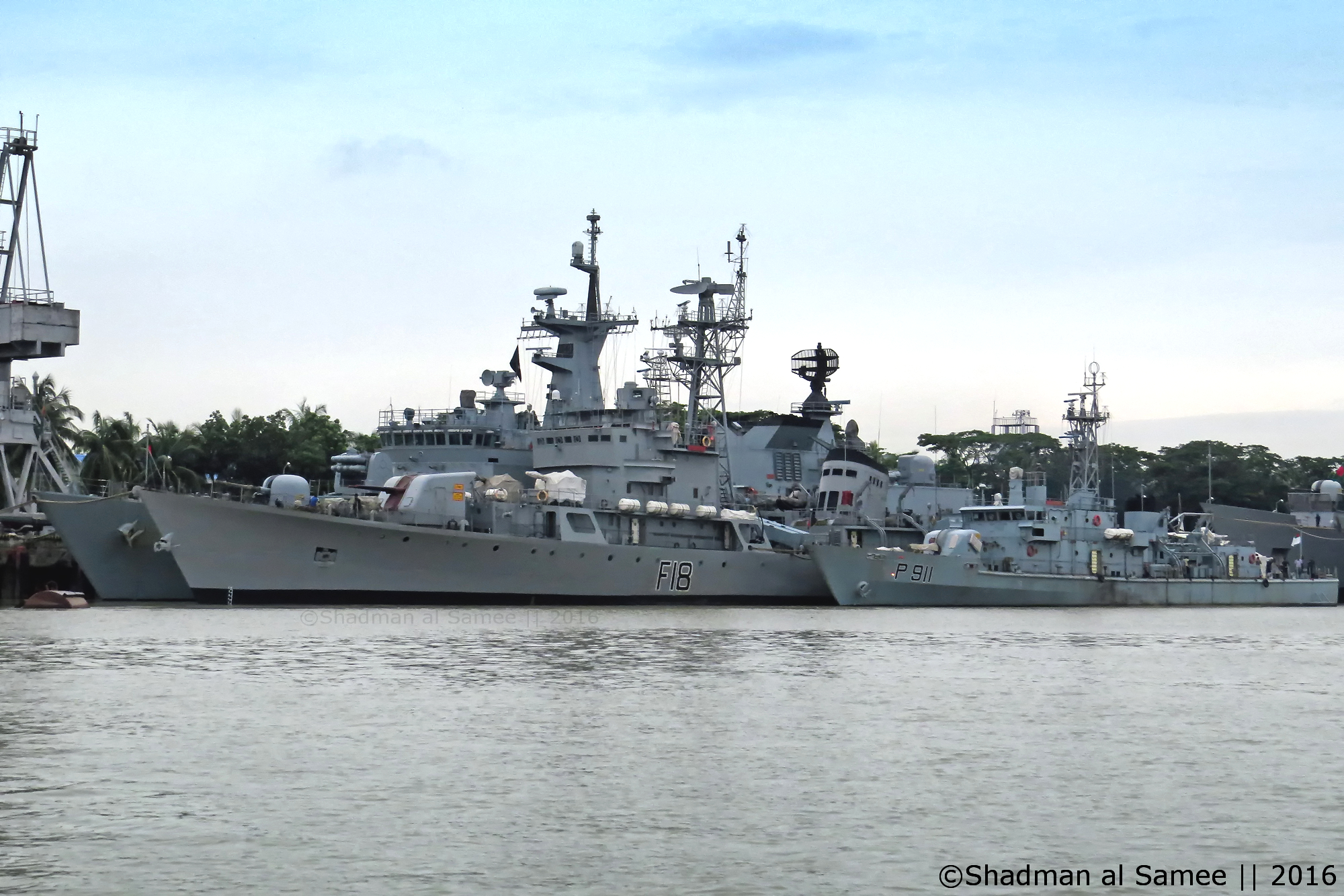

History

Bangladesh
- Name: BNS Madhumati
- Ordered: July 1995
- Builder: Hyundai, Ulsan, Republic of Korea
- Launched: 31 August 1997
- Acquired: October 1997
- Commissioned: 18 February 1998
- Home port: Chattogram
- Identification: Pennant number: P 911
- Status: In active service

General characteristics
- Class & type: Sea Dragon-class patrol craft
- Displacement: 635 tonnes
- Length: 60.8 m (199 ft 6 in)
- Beam: 8 m (26 ft 3 in)
- Draught: 2.7 m (8 ft 10 in)
- Propulsion: 2 × SEMT-Pielstick 12 PA6 diesels; 9,600 hp(m) (7.08 MW) sustained; 2 × shafts
- Speed: 24 knots (44 km/h; 28 mph)
- Range: 6,000 nautical miles (11,000 km; 6,900 mi) at 15 knots (28 km/h; 17 mph)
- Complement: 43 (7 officers)
- Electronic warfare & decoys: Weapons Control: Optronic director; Surface Search and navigation: Kelvin Hughes KH 1007, I-band, Navigation: GEM Electronics SPN 753B; I-band
- Armament: 1 × Bofors 57 mm/70 Mk 1; 1 × Bofors 40 mm/70; 2 × Oerlikon 20 mm

BNS Madhumati is a Sea Dragon-class patrol craft of the Bangladesh Navy. This vessel has been serving the Bangladesh Navy since 1998.

== Career ==
Madhumati was built by Hyundai Shipyard, South Korea. She was originally ordered for the Coast Guard in July 1995 and delivered in October 1997. She was commissioned into the Bangladesh Navy on 18 February 1998. The ship is very similar to South Korean Coast Guard vessels, but possesses improved fire equipment and Vosper stabilizers.

In November 2008, Madhumati along with BNS Abu Bakr and BNS Nirbhoy intercepted Myanmar Navy ships in a disputed region of the Bay of Bengal where they were supporting exploration of oil and gas fields.

Madhumati was deployed to Lebanon with the UN mission United Nations Interim Force in Lebanon (UNIFIL) from 17 May 2010 to 14 June 2014. She returned to Bangladesh on 11 August 2014. On her way, she visited the ports of Salalah and Sultan Qaboos of Oman, Port of Colombo in Sri Lanka and Mumbai and Chennai Port of India on a goodwill mission.

== See also ==
- List of active ships of the Bangladesh Navy
