= BNS Nirbhoy =

History

Bangladesh
- Name: BNS Nirbhoy
- Commissioned: 1 December 1985
- Decommissioned: 19 January 2022
- Status: Decommissioned

General characteristics
- Class & type: Type 037 Hainan-class submarine chaser
- Displacement: 400 tonnes
- Length: 58.77 m (192 ft 10 in)
- Beam: 7.2 m (23 ft 7 in)
- Draught: 2.2 m (7 ft 3 in)
- Propulsion: 4 × Diesel engine, 8,800 hp (6,600 kW) 4 × shafts
- Speed: 30.5 knots (56.5 km/h)
- Range: 2,000 nmi (3,700 km) at 14 knots
- Complement: 70 personnel
- Sensors & processing systems: 1 × Pot Head surface search radar; 1 × SJD-3 telescoping high frequency active sonar
- Armament: 2 x twin 57mm 70-cal Type 76 DP guns; 2 x twin 25mm 60cal Type 61 guns; 4 x RBU-1200 (Type 81) (5-barrel) ASW rockets; 2 x BMB-2 ASW mortars; 2 x depth charge rails with 20 depth charges

BNS Nirbhoy was a Type 037-class submarine chaser of the Bangladesh Navy. She served the Bangladesh Navy till 2022.

== Career ==
BNS Nirbhoy was commissioned into the Bangladesh Navy on 1 December 1985.

In November 2008, BNS Nirbhoy along with BNS Abu Bakr and BNS Madhumati intercepted Myanmar Navy ships in a contested region of the Bay of Bengal where they were supporting exploration of oil and gas fields.

She was decommissioned from the Bangladesh Navy on 19 January 2022.

== Electronics ==
The ship used a Pot Head radar as primary electronics. It was a surface search radar which was effective in performing mine laying operations. For ASW operations, she used Chinese SJD-3 telescoping high frequency active sonar. Instead of being fixed to the hull, SJD-3 had a telescoping arm, so when not in use, the sonar was stored in the hull and when deployed, the sonar was lowered into water several meter below the hull, thus increasing detection range by avoiding buffeting generated by the hull.

== Armament ==
The primary armaments of the ship were two twin 57mm 70-cal Type 76 DP guns and two twin 25mm 60cal Type 61 guns. Besides these she carried a variety of weapons to perform ASW missions. The ASW weapons were four RBU-1200 (Type 81) (5-barrel) ASW rockets, two BMB-2 ASW mortars and two depth charge rails with 20 depth charges.

== See also ==
- List of active ships of the Bangladesh Navy
- BNS Durjoy
