= List of historic ships of the Bangladesh Navy =

This article is a list of all historic ships of the Bangladesh Navy that are decommissioned or damaged since 1971.

Bangladesh vessels use the prefix "BNS", standing for "Bangladesh Navy Ship".

== Frigates ==
Class	Picture	Type	Ships	Displacement (Tons)	Note
Type 053H1 (Jianghu-II) class		Guided missile frigate	BNS Osman (F 18)	1,730	Ex-PLAN Xiangtan. First guided missile frigate of the Bangladesh Navy. Decommissioned in 2020.
Type 61 Salisbury class		Frigate	BNS Umar Farooq (F 16)	2,408	Ex-HMS Llandaff (F61). After brief use as museum ship from December 2015, she was sold for demolition in Bangladesh in 2016.
Type 41 Leopard class		Frigate	BNS Abu Bakr (F 15); BNS Ali Haider (F 17)	2,520	Ex-HMS Lynx and ex-HMS Jaguar. Replaced with two Type 053H2 Jianghu-III-class guided missile frigates, Huangshi and Wuhu

== Offshore patrol vessels ==
Class	Picture	Type	Ships	Displacement (Tons)	Note
Bishkhali class		LPC	BNS Bishkhali (P 311)	143	Ex-PNS Jessore. Decommissioned on 20 May 2014.
Island class		OPV	BNS Shaheed Ruhul Amin	570	Decommissioned on 16 June 2020.
Ajay class		OPV	BNS Padma (P 312); BNS Surma (P 313)	150	Ex-INS Aksay and ex-INS Ajay, gifted by Indian Navy in 1973 and 1974.

== Fast attack craft ==
Class	Picture	Type	Ships	Displacement (Tons)	Note
Missile
Type 024 missile boat		Missile boat	BNS Durbar (P 8111); BNS Duranta (P 8112); BNS Durvedya (P 8113); BNS Durdam (P 8114); BNS Uttal (P 8141)	79	Decommissioned on 30 March 2017.
Gun
Type 062 class gunboat		Fast attack craft (gun)	BNS Tawfique (P 611); BNS Tawheed (P 612); BNS Tamjeed (P 613); BNS Tanveer (P 614); BNS Shaheed Daulat (P 411); BNS Shaheed Farid (P 412); BNS Shahhed Mohibullah (P 413); BNS Shaheed Akhtaruddin (P 414)	135	Four transferred to Bangladesh Coast Guard.
ASW
Type 037 class submarine chaser		Submarine chaser	BNS Durjoy (P 811); BNS Nirbhoy (P 812)	392	
Kraljevica class		Submarine chaser	BNS Karnafuli (P314); BNS Tista (P315)	245	Decommissioned on 9 November 2022.
Torpedo
Type 025 class torpedo boat		Torpedo boat	BNS TB 35 (T 8235); BNS TB 36 (T 8236); BNS TB 37 (T 8237); BNS TB 38 (T 8238)	45	Standard: 2 x 533 mm torpedo tubes and 4 x 14.5 mm heavy machine guns (2x2), 2 mines and additional machine guns. Decommissioned on 18 June 2015.
P 4-class torpedo boat		Torpedo boat	BNS TB 1 (T 8221); BNS TB 2 (T 8222); BNS TB 3 (T 8223); BNS TB 4 (T 8224)	19.5	Standard: 2 x 450 mm torpedo tubes and 2 x 14.5 mm heavy machine guns.

== Riverine patrol boats ==
Class	Picture	Type	Ships	Displacement (Tons)	Note
Pabna class		Riverine patrol craft	BNS Pabna (P 111); BNS Noakhali (P 112); BNS Patuakhali (P 113); BNS Rangamati (P 114); BNS Bogra (P 115)	69	Transferred to Bangladesh Coast Guard in 1995.

== Research and survey ships ==
Class	Picture	Type	Ships	Displacement (Tons)	Note
Yuch'in class		Coastal survey ship	BNS Tallashi (H 582)	85	Chinese made Landing Craft Mechanized. She was converted into coastal survey vessel in 1983 with the addition of survey equipment. 25 m length. 2 × twin 14.5 mm guns. After serving the Bangladesh Navy for around 36 years, the ship was decommissioned on 19 December 2019.

== Training ship ==
Class	Picture	Type	Ships	Displacement (Tons)	Note
Island class		Training ship OPV	BNS Shaheed Ruhul Amin (A511)	1 280	Ex-Royal Navy Island-class patrol vessel HMS Jersey.

== Amphibious warfare ==
Class	Picture	Type	Ships	Displacement (Tons)	Note
Yuch'in class		Landing Craft Mechanized	BNS LCT 104 (A 586)	85	Chinese made. Received on 1 July 1986. 25 m length. 2 × twin 14.5 mm guns. Decommissioned in 2005.

== Auxiliaries ==
Class	Picture	Type	Ships	Displacement (Tons)	Note
Oil tanker		Fleet tanker	BNS Khan Jahan Ali (A 515)	665	Ex-Soho Maru (T1056) by Naikai Shipbuilding Setoda in Onomichi, Japan 1963. Sold after 1983 and commissioned on 14 July 1987 as naval tanker. Decommissioned after 28 years on 05 Sept 2015.

== See also ==
- List of active ships of the Bangladesh Navy
- List of ships of the Bangladesh Coast Guard
- List of active aircraft of the Bangladesh Air Force
- List of historic aircraft of the Bangladesh Air Force
- List of active Bangladesh military aircraft
