= BNS Uttal =

Type 024 Missile Boat of the Bangladesh Navy

History

Bangladesh
- Name: BNS Uttal
- Builder: Wuhu Shipyard
- Commissioned: 23 August 1992
- Decommissioned: 30 March 2017
- In service: 1992-2017
- Identification: Pennant number P-8141
- Fate: Scrapped

General characteristics
- Class & type: Type 024 class missile boat
- Displacement: 79 tons
- Length: 79 m (259 ft)
- Beam: 27 m (89 ft)
- Draft: 1.8 m (5.9 ft)
- Installed power: 4 x Chinese L-12V-180 diesel engines; 4,800 hp (3,600 kW)
- Propulsion: 4 shafts
- Speed: 38 kn (70 km/h; 44 mph)
- Range: 520 nmi (960 km; 600 mi) at 26 kn (48 km/h; 30 mph)
- Complement: 17
- Sensors & processing systems: 1 × Type 352 Square Tie Surface search radar
- Armament: 2 × SY-1 missiles; 2 × Type 61 25 mm guns (II x 2)

BNS Uttal was a Chinese-built Type 024 Missile Boat of the Bangladesh Navy. The ship served Bangladesh Navy from 1992 to 2017.

== Career ==
BNS Uttal was commissioned into Bangladesh Navy on 23 August 1992. In Exercise Sea Thunder 2014, Uttal fired a SY-1 missile. She was decommissioned from the Bangladesh Navy on 30 March 2017. Later on she was scrapped.

== Design ==
The ship carried two SY-1 anti-ship missiles and two Type 61 25 mm (II x 2) guns. For surface search, she had a Type 352 Square Tie Radar. The vessel had the Chinese copy of Soviet M50 engine called L-12V-180 engines which could run the ship at a top speed of 38 kn (70 km/h; 44 mph).

== See also ==
- List of active ships of the Bangladesh Navy
- BNS Durbar
- BNS Duranta
- BNS Durvedya
- BNS Durdam
