= CGS Sobuj Bangla =

Bangladesh Coast Guard patrol vessel

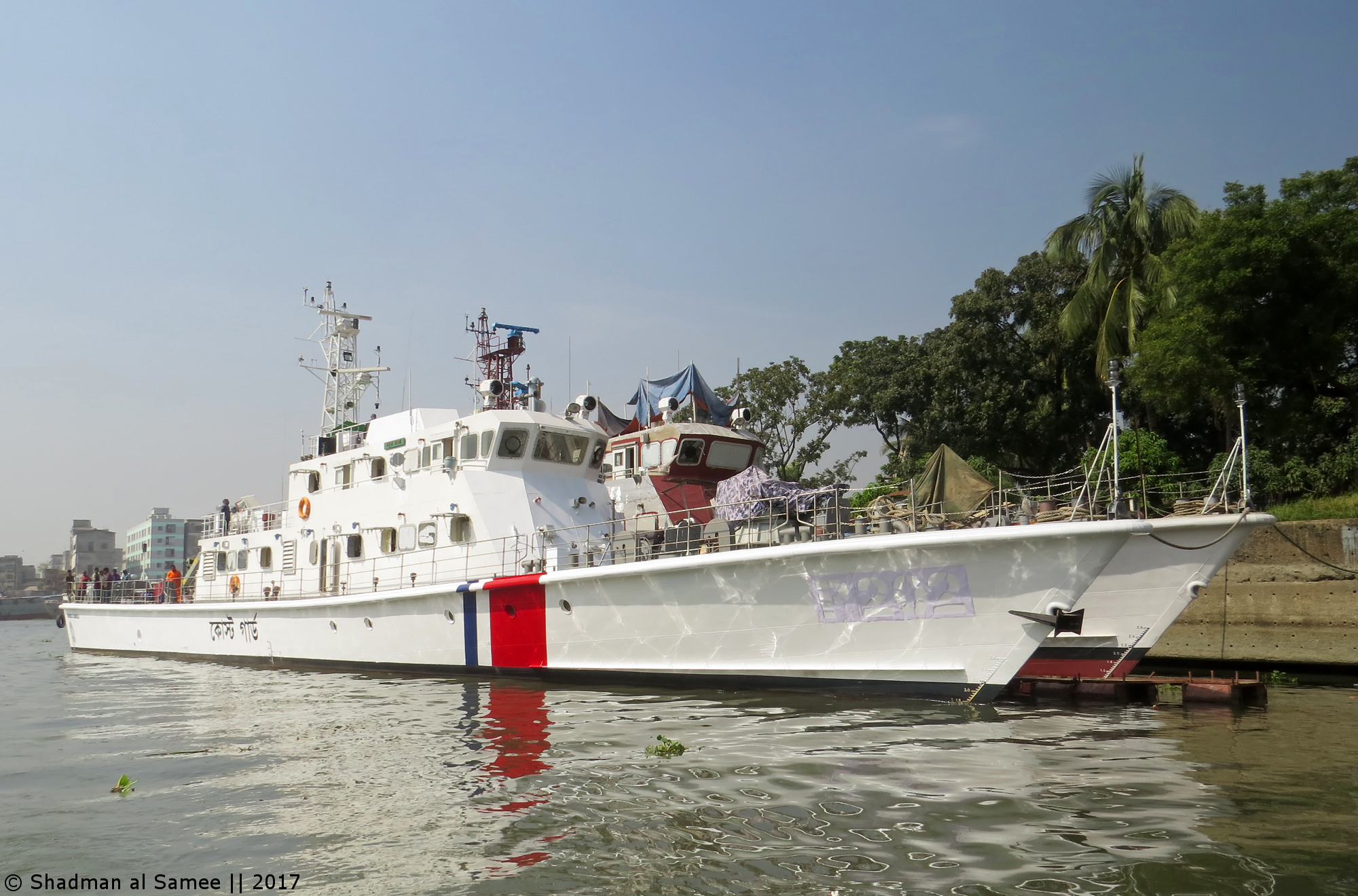

History

Bangladesh
- Name: CGS Sobuj Bangla
- Builder: Dockyard and Engineering Works Limited
- Laid down: 21 April 2015
- Launched: 1 December 2016
- Acquired: 1 August 2018
- Commissioned: 15 November 2020
- Identification: Pennant number: P 202
- Status: Active

General characteristics
- Class & type: Sobuj Bangla-class patrol craft
- Displacement: 297 tonnes
- Length: 51.4 m (169 ft)
- Beam: 7 m (23 ft)
- Draught: 1.9 m (6 ft 3 in)
- Propulsion: 2 × DEUTZ 2,240 kW (3,000 hp) diesel, 2 × shafts
- Speed: 23 knots (43 km/h; 26 mph)
- Range: 1,500 nmi (2,800 km; 1,700 mi)
- Complement: 45 personnel
- Armament: 2 × Oerlikon KBA 25 mm gun; 2 × 14.5 mm gun

CGS Sobuj Bangla is the lead vessel of the Sobuj Bangla-class inshore patrol vessels, which has served the Bangladesh Coast Guard since 2020.

== Career ==
The ship was laid down on 21 April 2015. She was launched on 1 December 2016. She was handed over to the Bangladesh Coast Guard on 1 August 2018. She was commissioned to the Bangladesh Coast Guard on 15 November 2020.

== Design ==
The ship is 51.4 metres (169 ft) long, 7 metres (23 ft) wide and has a 1.9 metres (6 ft 3 in) draught with a displacement of 297 tonnes. The patrol craft is powered by two German DEUTZ diesel engines which can produce 2,240 kW (3,000 hp) driving two shafts for a top speed of 23 knots (43 km/h; 26 mph). She has a complement of 45 and a maximum range of 1,500 nautical miles (2,800 km; 1,700 mi). She can carry out operations in sea state four and can sustain up to sea state six.

== Armament ==
The ship is armed with two Oerlikon KBA 25 mm guns and two 14.5 mm guns.

== See also ==
- List of ships of the Bangladesh Coast Guard
