= DEW LCT-class =

Class overview
- Name: DEW LCT-class
- Builders: Dockyard and Engineering Works Limited; Sea Quest Technology Pte Ltd, Singapore (technical assistance)
- Operators: Bangladesh Navy
- Built: 2013–2014
- In service: 2015–present
- In commission: 2015–present
- Completed: 2
- Active: 2

History

Bangladesh
- Name: DEW LCT-class
- Owner: Bangladesh Navy
- Ordered: 23 August 2013
- Builder: Dockyard and Engineering Works Limited
- Launched: 18 November 2014
- Acquired: 14 November 2014
- Commissioned: 6 September 2015
- Status: Active
- Notes: Built with technical assistance from Sea Quest Technology Pte Ltd, Singapore; constructed to Lloyd's Register standards

General characteristics
- Type: Landing Craft Tank
- Displacement: 130 tons
- Length: 25.60 m (84.0 ft)
- Beam: 5.40 m (17.7 ft)
- Draught: 1.20 m (3.9 ft)
- Propulsion: 2 × Volvo Penta D9 MH 420 hp (310 kW) diesel engines (2200 RPM); 2 × Perkins Sabre 4.4GM 35 kW generators (1500 RPM); 2 × Fixed-pitch propellers; Twin Disc gearbox
- Speed: 10 knots (19 km/h; 12 mph)
- Range: 1,500 nautical miles (2,800 km; 1,700 mi)
- Endurance: 10 days
- Complement: 11
- Sensors & processing systems: 1 × Furuno FAR2117 XN-24AF navigation radar (Japan)
- Armament: 2 × STK-50MG 12.7 mm anti-aircraft machine guns; 2 × QW-2 man-portable SAMs (wartime)
- Notes: Can carry 30 soldiers, 1 MBT-2000 tank, 1 medium artillery gun, 1 bulldozer, small and medium-sized military vehicles, and various military equipment; suitable for HADR and UN peacekeeping missions

DEW LCT-class is a class of Landing Craft Tank (LCT) ships built in Bangladesh and used by the Bangladesh Navy. These ships were constructed by Dockyard and Engineering Works Limited with technical assistance from Sea Quest Technology Pte Ltd, Singapore. Each ship is capable of conducting amphibious operations in both maritime and coastal areas, and can carry 30 soldiers, supplies, weapons and ammunition, 1 MBT-2000 tank, 1 medium artillery gun, 1 bulldozer, small and medium-sized military vehicles, and various types of military equipment. Additionally, the ship takes part in rescue missions during disasters and in post-disaster relief operations.

== History ==
As part of a long-term modernization plan adopted for the armed forces, the Government of Bangladesh decided to increase procurement of military equipment from both domestic and foreign sources. Moreover, such amphibious ships were required to operate in naval bases near coastal areas. The need for these ships became especially apparent for conducting amphibious operations and supplying landing forces, tanks, weapons, ammunition, and logistics during both wartime and peacetime in Chittagong, Mongla, Saint Martin Island, and surrounding coastal areas. In this context, on 23 August 2013, a contract was signed between the Bangladesh Navy and Dockyard and Engineering Works Limited to construct two Landing Craft Tank ships. The required designs and technology for building the ships were provided by Sea Quest Technology Pte Ltd, Singapore. After construction, on 14 November 2014, the ships BNS LCT 103 and BNS LCT 105 were handed over to the then Chief of Naval Staff Vice Admiral M Farid Habib, NBP, OSP, BCGM, ndc, psc. These ships were built following the regulations of the UK-based classification society Lloyd's Register. Finally, on 6 September 2015, the two ships were commissioned and included in the Navy fleet by the Prime Minister Sheikh Hasina.

== Features and mechanical structure ==
Each ship has a length of 25.60 meters (84.0 feet), a width of 5.40 meters (17.7 feet), a depth of 1.20 meters (3.9 feet), and a weight of 130 tons. Each ship is equipped with 2 Volvo Penta D9 MH 420 horsepower (310 kilowatts) diesel engines (2200 RPM), and 2 Perkins Sabre 4.4GM generators of 35 kilowatts (1500 RPM). As a result, the ships have a maximum speed of 10 knots per hour (19 kilometers per hour; 12 miles per hour). The ships can operate continuously for 10 days with a crew of 11 personnel.

The Bangladesh Navy frequently has to carry out military roles to prevent amphibious landings by hostile forces, as well as conduct Humanitarian Assistance and Disaster Relief (HADR) operations in coastal areas. The LCTs built with domestic technology are suitable for meeting these requirements. During amphibious military operations, each LCT is capable of landing its own assault team onshore and, for a certain time, carrying a group of troops and equipment. Additionally, these ships are also deployable in United Nations peacekeeping missions.

== Armament ==
These ships, which serve in supportive roles during disaster and peacetime, are equipped with:

- 2 STK-50MG 12.7 mm anti-aircraft machine guns;
- In special wartime situations, 2 QW-2 man-portable surface-to-air missile systems can also be deployed on the ship.

== Ships ==
Pennant Number	Name	Builder	Construction Started	Launched	Commissioned	Status
A586	BNS LCT 103	Dockyard and Engineering Works Limited	23 August 2013	18 November 2014	6 September 2015	Active
A588	BNS LCT 105	Dockyard and Engineering Works Limited	23 August 2013	18 November 2014	6 September 2015	Active
