= Type 271 landing craft =

Explanation of Type 271 landing craft

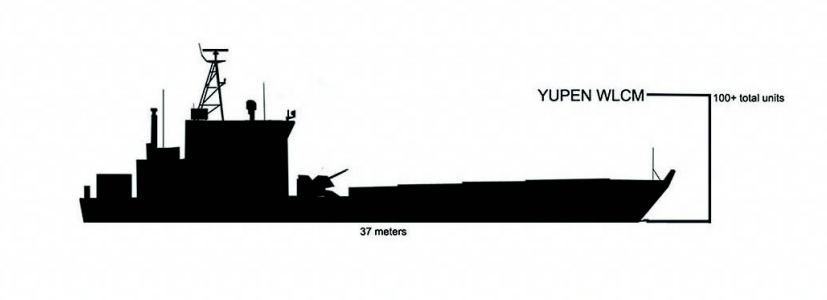
Type 271 landing craft

The Type 271 landing craft is a family landing craft of the People's Liberation Army Navy (PLAN). Most models in this class are landing craft utility (LCU)s, but the last model has been developed into a Landing ship medium (LSM).

== Type 271I landing craft utility ==
History

China
- Builder: Qingdao Shipyard
- Fate: Converted to Type 271II

Class overview
- Name: Type 271I landing craft utility
- Operators: People's Liberation Army Navy
- Preceded by: LCU 1600 series
- Succeeded by: Type 271II

General characteristics
- Class & type: Yupen class
- Type: Landing Craft Utility
- Armament: Machine guns

The origin of Type 271 series landing craft dates back in 1966, when World War II era LCU 1600 series PLAN captured from ROCN at the end of Chinese Civil War began to be retired from service. PLAN proposed to develop a landing craft utility (LCU) based on the experienced gained from Type 067 utility landing craft and Type 068/069 mechanized landing craft (LCM). In addition to wartime mission, this class is tasked to supply islands without port facilities with up to 100 tons of equipment, cargo and freshwater in peacetime. The LCU is designated Type 271, and received NATO reporting name Yupen class, a name used for the rest members of Type 271 LCU series.

Design of Type 271 was completed in December 1967, after which the construction of Type 271 LCU begun in August 1968 at Qingdao Shipyard in Qingdao, and the boat was completed in June 1970. Sea trials begun in September 1970 in Qingdao, but the results were rather unsatisfactory. The primary reason for such disappointing result was because the political turmoil in China at the time, namely, the Cultural Revolution. Rework immediately began and the modified model was designated as Type 271II, with the original Type 271 redesignated as Type 271I for clear distinction. Type 271 is mainly intended for delivery of troops and vehicles in places along the rivers and coasts without harbor facilities.

== Type 271II landing craft utility ==
History

China
- Builder: Qingdao Shipyard
- Fate: Converted to Type 271IID

Class overview
- Name: Type 271II landing craft utility
- Operators: People's Liberation Army Navy
- Preceded by: Type 271I
- Succeeded by: Type 271IID

General characteristics
- Class & type: Yupen class
- Type: Landing Craft Utility
- Displacement: 400t normal, 500t max
- Length: 54m
- Beam: 9.2m
- Draft: 1.7m
- Propulsion: two 6300ZC diesel @ 600 hp each
- Speed: 13 kn
- Range: 1000 nmi @ 10 kn
- Endurance: 20 days
- Capacity: 100 t normal, 150 max
- Complement: 300 fully armed troops
- Crew: 36
- Armament: 4 Type 69 14.5 mm machine guns

Type 271II landing craft utility is the direct result of the disappointing performance of the original Type 271 LCU. Redesign work of Type 271II LCU was completed in 1971, and construction begun in December 1972 at Qingdao Shipyard. In September 1975, the ship was launched and on November 30, 1975, this first unit of Type 271II LCU was handed to PLAN and began trials. As with Type 271I LCU, the program was delayed due to the Cultural Revolution. The pace of trials and testing really picked up in 1976 when the Cultural Revolution ended, and this class finally received certification in 1978 and series production started soon after. The cargo capacity of Type 271II is either 3 Type 59 tanks or 7 5-ton trucks.

== Type 271IID landing craft utility ==
History

China
- Builder: Changsha Shipyard

Class overview
- Name: Type 271IID landing craft utility
- Operators: People's Liberation Army Navy
- Preceded by: Type 271II
- Succeeded by: Type 271III

General characteristics
- Class & type: Yupen class
- Type: Landing Craft Utility
- Displacement: 507t
- Propulsion: two 6300ZC diesel @ 600 hp each
- Armament: 4 Type 69 14.5 mm machine guns.

As with the first member of Type 271 series LCU, Type 271II LCU was not produced in large numbers either, because in 1979, PLAN requested minor modification of Type 271II LCU based on experience gained from deployment. The result was Type 271IID LCU, with D stands for Dingxing (定型 in Chinese), meaning finalized design. The displacement is slightly increased to 507 t from the original 500 t of Type 217II LCU. The first unit of Type 271IID LCU was completed by Changsha Shipyard, and all earlier units were subsequently converted to this standard as Type 271IID went into series production at both Changsha and Qingdao. The modification included the pressure wave plate, anchor and propulsion systems.

== Type 271III landing craft utility ==
History

China
- Builder: Changsha Shipyard

Class overview
- Name: Type 271III landing craft utility
- Operators: People's Liberation Army Navy
- Preceded by: Type 271IID
- Succeeded by: Type 271IIIA

General characteristics
- Class & type: Yupen class
- Type: Landing Craft Utility
- Displacement: >600t
- Propulsion: two diesel @ 1142 hp each
- Armament: 2 Type 69 14.5 mm machine guns.

In November 1984, requirement of Type 271III LCU was issued, but once again, the program was delayed, but this time was not due to political turmoil in China, but instead, the policy change: the economic reform in China had put military programs in the backseat. As a result, construction of the first unit did not begin until March 1987 at Changsha Shipyard, and two years later in December 1989, the unit went into service. The primary improvement of Type 271III LCU over Type 271IID is that its propulsion system was German origin (MAN SE), and China license produced it to greatly increase the reliability and service life of the engine. The armament and ability to operate in harsh sea state is also improved, while the bow door is changed to V-shaped double door from the original single piece flat piece.

== Type 271IIIA landing ship medium ==
History

China
- Builder: Changsha Shipyard

Class overview
- Name: Type 271IIIA landing ship medium
- Operators: People's Liberation Army Navy
- Preceded by: Type 271III
- Succeeded by: Type 074 Yuhai class

General characteristics
- Class & type: Yulü class
- Type: Landing Ship Medium
- Displacement: 613.7t light, 800t full
- Length: 56.5m
- Beam: 10.4m
- Draft: 2.28m
- Depth: 5.057m
- Propulsion: two 8L20/27 diesel @ 1142 hp each
- Speed: 15 kn
- Range: 1000 nmi
- Endurance: 15 days
- Capacity: 100 t normal, 150 max
- Complement: 200 fully armed troops
- Crew: 56
- Armament: 2 Type 69 14.5 mm machine guns.

Type 271IIIA landing ship medium (LSM) is the latest member of Type 271 series LCU, and it received NATO reporting name Yulü class. The main difference between Type 271IIIA and Type 271III from which Type 271IIIA is developed from is that the displacement of Type 271IIIA when fully loaded has increased by a third to 800 tons, and hence becoming a LSM. Armament was greatly reduced to two Type 69 twin 14.5 mm MG, while speed is also reduced to 15 kn. The number of crew is almost doubled to 56 due to the need to handle more complex machinery. To accommodate the larger size, a pair of more powerful version of Chinese license produced MAN SE 8L20/27 diesel engines have been installed, each with 1142 hp. Typical cargo carrying capacity of Type 271IIIA is either 3 medium tanks plus an infantry platoon of 70 troops, or 7 light amphibious tanks (over load, usually 6 for normal payload), or 200 fully equipped troops.
