= List of ships of the Bangladesh Coast Guard =

The emblem of Bangladesh Coast Guard

Naval Ensign of Bangladesh Coast Guard

Bangladesh Coast Guard currently operates 167 surface ships and craft. Most of them are small coastal patrol vessels. The names of coast guard vessels use the prefix "CGS", which stands for "Coast Guard Ship".

Racing stripe of Bangladesh Coast Guard

== Offshore patrol vessels ==
Class	Picture	Type	Ships	Origin	Displacement	Note
Active (4)
Leader class		Offshore patrol vessel	CGS Syed Nazrul (PL 71) CGS Tajuddin (PL 72) CGS Mansoor Ali (PL 73) CGS Kamaruzzaman (PL 74)	Italy	1,285 tons	CGS Syed Nazrul and CGS Tajuddin were refitted at Fincantieri. Delivery was completed on 3 August 2016. Two ships arrived in Chittagong on 2 November 2016. CGS Mansoor Ali and CGS Kamaruzzaman were delivered after refitting on 12 October 2017 and arrived in Mongla on 22 December 2017. Last two ships were commissioned on 15 November 2020.

== Inshore patrol vessels ==
Class	Picture	Type	Ships	Origin	Displacement	Note
Active (8)
Sobuj Bangla class		Inshore patrol vessel	CGS Sobuj Bangla (P202) CGS Shamol Bangla (P203) CGS Sonar Bangla (P204) CGS Aparajeya Bangla (P205) CGS Shadhin Bangla (P206) CGS Apurbo Bangla (P207) CGS Joy Bangla (P208)	Bangladesh	297 tons	First and last two were constructed by Dockyard and Engineering Works Limited while other three were constructed by Khulna Shipyard. Last two vessels are on sea trials.
Ruposhi Bangla class		Inshore patrol vessel	CGS Ruposhi Bangla (P201)	Bangladesh	198 tons	The ship is 38.5 m (126 ft 4 in) in length, 7 m (23 ft 0 in) in breadth and has a top speed of 14.27 knots (26.43 km/h; 16.42 mph).

== Fast patrol vessels ==
Class	Picture	Type	Ships	Origin	Displacement	Note
Active (4)
Kutubdia class		Fast patrol vessel	CGS Kutubdia (P103) CGS Sonadia (P104)	Bangladesh	235 tons	These ships are of 43.4 m (142 ft 5 in) length, 6.4 m (21 ft 0 in) breadth and 1.9 m (6 ft 3 in) draught. They have a displacement of 235 tons, maximum speed of 25 knots (46 km/h; 29 mph) and maximum range of 1,500 nmi (2,800 km; 1,700 mi). They are able to carry up to 33 personnel. Handed over to the Bangladesh Coast Guard on 1 August 2018. CGS Kutubdia and CGS Sonadia were commissioned on 15 November 2020.
Porte Grande class		Fast patrol vessel	CGS Shetgang (P101) CGS Porte Grande (P102)	Bangladesh	105 tons	Built at Ananda Shipyard and Shipways, Narayanganj.

== Coastal patrol vessels ==
Class	Picture	Type	Ships	Origin	Displacement	Note
Active (4)
Shanghai II class		Coastal patrol vessel	CGS Tawfique (P611) CGS Tawheed (P612) CGS Tamjeed (P613) CGS Tanveer (P614)	China	122.5 tons	Transferred from Bangladesh Navy.

== Riverine patrol craft ==
Class	Picture	Type	Ships	Origin	Displacement	Note
Active (5)
Pabna class		Riverine patrol craft	CGS Pabna (P111) CGS Noakhali (P112) CGS Patuakhali (P113) CGS Rangamati (P114) CGS Bogra (P115)	Bangladesh	75 tons	Transferred from Bangladesh Navy.

== Harbour patrol boats ==
Class	Picture	Type	Ships	Origin	Displacement	Note
Active (6)
Atrai class		Harbour patrol boat	CGS Atrai (HPB-4901) CGS Gorai (HPB-4902) CGS Baleshwar (HPB-4903) CGS Tetulia (HPB-4904) CGS Shitolokkha (HPB-4905) CGS Burigonga (HPB-4906)	Bangladesh; Malaysia	24.5 tons	2 built in Malaysia by Destini and the rest built in Bangladesh at Dockyard and Engineering Works Limited through transfer of technology.

== Small craft ==
Class	Picture	Type	Origin	Displacement	Quantity	Note
Active (136)
X-12 fast patrol craft		High-speed patrol boat	Bangladesh; Indonesia	10.2 tons	10	The boats were licensed-built from Indonesia PT.Lundin. As part of the contract's technology transfer clause, two of the vessels under the contract were built in Banyuwangi, Indonesia while the remaining 16 vessels were constructed at the Dockyard and Engineering Works Limited. 10 of the 18 vessels are in service with the Bangladesh Coast Guard. These boats are 11.7 m (38 ft 5 in) long with a 12.7 mm machine gun mount on cabin top and two additional gun mounts on the aft deck.
Sea Horse class		High-speed patrol boat	Bangladesh		7	
Metal shark boat		Rapid response boat	United States	7.6 tons	17	
Defender-class boat		Rapid response boat	United States	8.5 tons	5	
Sebatori class		Ambulance boat	United States	7.24 tons	3	
Typhoon boat		High speed boat	Croatia	5.49 tons	6	
Stingray boat		High speed boat	United States	11.2 tons	2	
Tornado boat		High speed boat	United States	7.4 tons	8	
Dolphin boat		High speed boat	United States	1.7 tons	19	
Hurricane boat		High speed boat	United States	11.8 tons	3	
Long range boat		Speed boat	Bangladesh		10	
Short range boat (SRB)		Speed boat	Bangladesh		13	
Rescue boat (RB)		Rescue boat	Bangladesh		1	
Rescue boat (RB)		Rescue boat	Japan		4	20-meter type coastal rescue boats.
Rescue boat (RB)		Rescue boat	Japan		20	10-meter small rescue boats.

== Under construction ==
Class	Quantity	Origin	Displacement	Note
Under construction
Inshore patrol vessel	2	Bangladesh		
Self-propelled floating crane	1	Bangladesh		BCGFC Shakti
Tugboat	2	Bangladesh		BCGT Protay and BCGT Promotto
Flat deck pontoon	4	Bangladesh		
High speed boat	6	Bangladesh		

== See also ==
- List of active ships of the Bangladesh Navy
- List of historic ships of the Bangladesh Navy
- Bangladesh Navy
- Bangladesh Army
- Bangladesh Air Force
