= CGS Bogra =

History

Bangladesh Coast Guard
- Name: CGS Bogra
- Builder: Dockyard and Engineering Works Limited
- Commissioned: 1995
- Identification: Pennant number: P 115
- Status: Active

Bangladesh Navy
- Name: BNS Bogra
- Commissioned: 1 June 1977
- Decommissioned: 1995
- Identification: Pennant number: P 115
- Fate: Transferred to Bangladesh Coast Guard

General characteristics
- Class & type: Pabna-class patrol boat
- Displacement: 69 tons
- Length: 22.9 m (75 ft 2 in)
- Beam: 6.1 m (20 ft 0 in)
- Draught: 1.9 m (6 ft 3 in)
- Propulsion: 2 Cummins diesel engine; 2 shafts
- Complement: 33 personnel
- Armament: 1 × Bofors 40 mm gun

CGS Bogra is a Pabna-class riverine patrol craft of the Bangladesh Coast Guard.

== History ==
The ship was built at Dockyard and Engineering Works Limited located in Narayanganj, Dhaka. She was commissioned into the Bangladesh Navy as BNS Bogra on 1 June 1977. In 1995, after the emergence of Bangladesh Coast Guard, the ship was transferred to them and commissioned as CGS Bogra.

== Design ==
The ship is 22.9 metres (75 ft 2 in) in length, 6.1 metres (20 ft 0 in) in breadth and 1.9 metres (6 ft 3 in) in draught. She has a displacement of 69 tons and a complement of 33 personnel. The ship carries one Bofors 40 mm gun of 60 calibres as armament. The patrol craft can be used for coastal patrolling also besides riverine patrolling.

== See also ==
- List of ships of the Bangladesh Coast Guard
- List of historic ships of the Bangladesh Navy
