= CGS Kutubdia =

History

Bangladesh
- Name: CGS Kutubdia
- Builder: Dockyard and Engineering Works Limited
- Acquired: 1 August 2018
- Commissioned: 15 November 2020
- Identification: Pennant number: P 103
- Status: Active

General characteristics
- Class & type: Kutubdia-class fast patrol boat
- Displacement: 235 tonnes
- Length: 43.4 m (142 ft)
- Beam: 6.4 m (21 ft)
- Draught: 1.9 m (6 ft 3 in)
- Propulsion: 2 × DEUTZ 2,240 kW (3,000 hp) diesel, 2 × shafts
- Speed: 25 knots (46 km/h; 29 mph)
- Range: 1,500 nmi (2,800 km; 1,700 mi)
- Complement: 33 personnel
- Armament: 2 × Oerlikon KBA 25 mm gun; 2 × 14.5 mm gun

CGS Kutubdia is the lead vessel of the Kutubdia-class fast patrol boat of the Bangladesh Coast Guard and has been serving the Bangladesh Coast Guard since 2020.

== Career ==
The ship was handed over to the Bangladesh Coast Guard on 1 August 2018. She was commissioned to the Bangladesh Coast Guard on 15 November 2020.

== Design ==
The ship is 43.4 metres (142 ft) long, 6.4 metres (21 ft) wide and has a 1.9 metres (6 ft 3 in) draught with a displacement of 235 tonnes. The patrol craft is powered by two German DEUTZ diesel engines which can produce 2,240 kW (3,000 hp) driving two shafts for a top speed of 25 knots (46 km/h; 29 mph). She has a complement of 33 and a maximum range of 1,500 nautical miles (2,800 km; 1,700 mi). She can carry out operations in sea state four and can sustain up to sea state six.

== Armament ==
The ship is armed with two Oerlikon KBA 25 mm guns and two 14.5 mm guns.

== See also ==
- List of ships of the Bangladesh Coast Guard
