= Type 079 landing ship =

Ship class of the Chinese Navy

Class overview
- Builders: Guangzhou Shipyard
- Operators: People's Liberation Army Navy
- Preceded by: Type 271 LCU
- Succeeded by: Type 074 (Yuhai-class)
- Subclasses: Type 079II
- In commission: 1976-2000s
- Completed: 31
- Retired: 31

General characteristics
- Type: Landing Ship Medium
- Displacement: 714t (normal), 730t (standard), 833 tonnes (full)
- Length: 72m
- Beam: 13.8m
- Draft: 2.6m
- Propulsion: two 6300 diesel engine @ 600 hp each
- Speed: 13 knots
- Range: 1000 nmi @ 10 kn
- Endurance: 7 days
- Capacity: 200 tons, or 5 medium tanks or 8 trucks
- Complement: 109
- Armament: 4 Type 61 25 mm autocannons; 2 x BM21 122 mm rocket launchers

The Type 079 landing ship (NATO reporting name: Yulian-class) was a class of landing ship medium (LSM) of the People's Liberation Army Navy. There are two subclasses of this type; 079I and 079II.

== Background ==
The origin of the Type 79 series LSM dates back in the 1970s, when North Vietnam asked China to produce a landing ship capable of carrying around 200 tons of cargo with maximum speed of 12 kn, but more importantly, the manufacturing technique had to be simply so that it must be able to be built quickly in large numbers.

== Type 079I ==
Design work by the 708th Research Institute for the Type 079 took more than two years, lasting from 1971 to 1973, and construction began in May 1974 at Guangzhou Shipyard International, and the first ship was launched on July 22, 1976. Due to changes in Sino-Vietnamese relations, the end customer became the PLAN instead of the Vietnam People's Navy. The ship entered PLAN service in October, 1976. This class received NATO reporting name Yulian-class. Trials between December 1972 to January 1977 revealed the performance was somewhat satisfactory, but the speed was slow and the ability to operate in bad weather condition was poor, with the maximum sea state allowed to operate being sea state 6. Work immediately began on a redesign named as Type 079II, while the first unit was subsequently named as Type 079I.

== Type 79II ==
Shortcomings of the Type 79I LSM revealed in trials lead to immediate redesign named as Type 79II LSM, which was completed in October 1977. A total of 31 were built, including the conversion of the sole Type 079I to Type 079II standard. 26 were completed by Guangzhou Shipyard International, and 4 were completed by Xiamen Shipyard. Like its predecessor Type 079I, the Type 079II was also designed by 708th Research Institute. The main difference between 079I and 079II is that the latter is larger, with dimensions increased to 72 m x 13.8 m x 2.6 m respectively, and the displacement was increased to 833 tonnes. More complex machinery was added, which lead to the increase of crew members to 109, more than 3 times of that of the original Type 079I. The speed was also slightly increased to 13 kn. Armament was strengthened by the addition of two BM21 122 mm rocket launchers. Nearly three decades after production ended in 1983, most still remained in Chinese service, mostly in Chinese navy South Sea Fleet (PLAN SSF), though most of them were delegated to transport duties.

== Ships of the class ==
All have been decommissioned.

Pennant Number	Fleet	Name
957	South Sea Fleet
958	South Sea Fleet	Fen River（汾河）
959	South Sea Fleet
960	South Sea Fleet
961	South Sea Fleet	Spring River (泉河)
962	South Sea Fleet
963	South Sea Fleet
964	South Sea Fleet
965	South Sea Fleet
966	South Sea Fleet
967	South Sea Fleet
968	South Sea Fleet
969	South Sea Fleet
970	South Sea Fleet
971	South Sea Fleet
972	South Sea Fleet
973	South Sea Fleet	5 Fingers Mountain(五指山)
974	South Sea Fleet	Lotus Mountain (莲花山)
975	South Sea Fleet	Lan River (岚河)
976	South Sea Fleet
977	South Sea Fleet	Mount Dingjun（定军山（
978	South Sea Fleet
979	South Sea Fleet	Yi River（沂水）
980	South Sea Fleet	Ali Mountain（阿里山）
981
982
983
984
985
986		Si River (泗河)

== See also ==
- People's Liberation Army Navy Surface Force

Equivalent landing ships of the same era

- BATRAL class
- Polnocny class
- Kumbhir class
