= Rangamati (disambiguation) =

Rangamati is a town and the administrative headquarters of Rangamati District in the Chittagong Hill Tracts of Bangladesh.

Rangamati may also refer to:

- CGS Rangamati, Pabna Class riverine patrol crafts of Bangladesh Coast Guard
- Rangamati (Jatiya Sangsad constituency), Constituency of Bangladesh's Jatiya Sangsad
- Rangamati District, district in Chattogram Division, Bangladesh
- Rangamati Government High School, a government high school in Rangamati, Bangladesh
- Rangamati Hill District Council, administrative unit in Bangladesh
- Rangamati Medical College, a public medical school in Rangamati, Bangladesh
- Rangamati Sadar Upazila, upazila in Chittagong, Bangladesh
- Rangamati Science and Technology University, a public university in Rangamati, Bangladesh
- Rangamati Stadium, football stadium in Rangamati, Bangladesh
- Rangamati Tea Estate Cemetery, European cemetery in Chaibasa village, Rangamati tea garden in West Bengal, India
