= CGS Apurbo Bangla =

Bangladesh Coast Guard vessel

History

Bangladesh
- Name: BCGS Apurbo Bangla
- Builder: Dockyard and Engineering Works Limited
- Laid down: 12 December 2017
- Acquired: 3 September 2019
- Commissioned: 21 June 2023
- Homeport: Chittagong
- Identification: Pennant number: PC 207
- Nickname(s): PC207
- Status: In service

General characteristics
- Class & type: Sobuj Bangla-class patrol craft
- Displacement: 315 tonnes
- Length: 52.8 m (173 ft)
- Beam: 7.4 m (24 ft)
- Draught: 2.0 m (6 ft 7 in)
- Depth: 4.5 m (15 ft)
- Propulsion: 2 × DEUTZ 2,240 kW (3,000 hp) diesel, 2 × shafts
- Speed: 23 knots (43 km/h; 26 mph)
- Range: 1,500 nmi (2,800 km; 1,700 mi)
- Boats & landing craft carried: 2x no
- Complement: 45 personnel
- Armament: 2 × Oerlikon KBA 25 mm gun; 2 × 14.5 mm gun

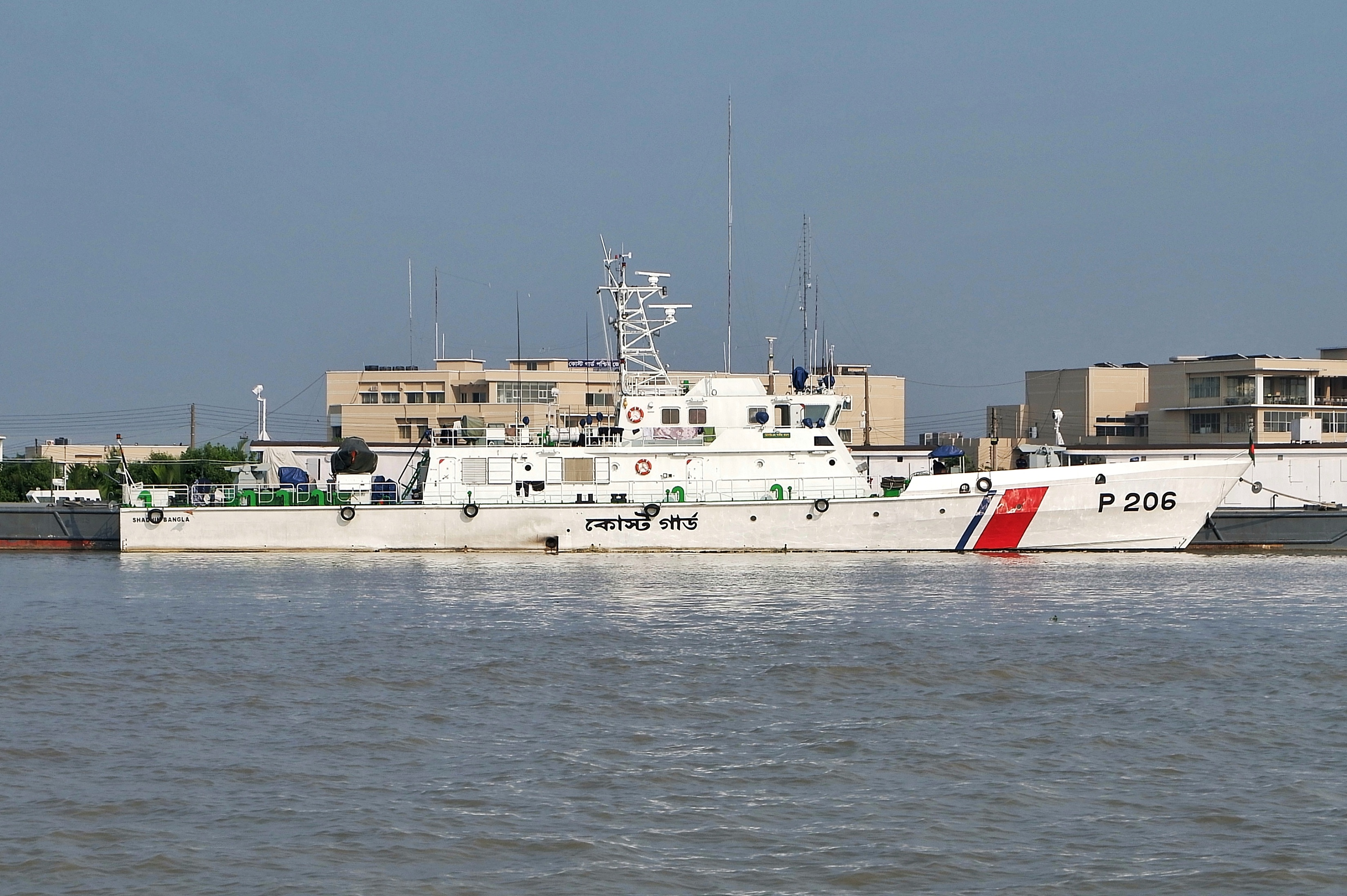
Padma Class Inshore Patrol Vessel "Shadhin Bangla" docked in Bangladesh Coast Guard West Zone Headquarter in Mongla, Bagerhat.

BCGS Apurbo Bangla is a Sobuj Bangla-class inshore patrol vessel of the Bangladesh Coast Guard. The ship is undergoing sea trials.

== Career ==
The ship was laid down on 12 December 2017. She was launched on 3 September 2019.

== Design ==
The ship is 52.8 metres (173 ft) long, 7.4 metres (24 ft) wide and has a 4.5 metres (15 ft) draught with a displacement of 315 tonnes. The patrol craft is powered by two German DEUTZ diesel engines which can produce 2,240 kW (3,000 hp) driving two shafts for a top speed of 23 knots (43 km/h; 26 mph). She has a complement of 45 and a maximum range of 1,500 nautical miles (2,800 km; 1,700 mi). She can carry out operations in sea state four and can sustain up to sea state six.

== Armament ==
The ship is armed with two Oerlikon KBA 25 mm guns and two 14.5 mm guns.

== See also ==
- List of ships of the Bangladesh Coast Guard
