= CGS Pabna =

Bangladesh Coast Guard vessel

History

Bangladesh Coast Guard
- Name: CGS Pabna
- Builder: Dockyard and Engineering Works Limited
- Commissioned: 1995
- Identification: Pennant number: P 111
- Status: Active

Bangladesh Navy
- Name: BNS Pabna
- Commissioned: 1 June 1972
- Decommissioned: 1995
- Identification: Pennant number: P 111
- Fate: Transferred to Bangladesh Coast Guard

General characteristics
- Class & type: Pabna-class patrol boat
- Displacement: 75 tons
- Length: 22.9 m (75 ft 2 in)
- Beam: 6.1 m (20 ft 0 in)
- Draught: 1.9 m (6 ft 3 in)
- Propulsion: 2 Cummins diesel engine; 2 shafts
- Complement: 33 personnel
- Armament: 1 × Bofors 40 mm gun

CGS Pabna is a Pabna-class riverine patrol craft of Bangladesh Coast Guard. She is the first ever warship made in Bangladesh.

== History ==
The ship was built at Dockyard and Engineering Works Limited. She was commissioned into the Bangladesh Navy as BNS Pabna on 1 June 1972. This ship was the first ship of Bangladesh Navy. Later on, in 1995, after the emergence of Bangladesh Coast Guard, the ship was transferred to them and commissioned into the Bangladesh Coast Guard as CGS Pabna.

== Design ==
The ship is 22.9 metres (75 ft 2 in) in length, 6.1 metres (20 ft 0 in) in breadth and 1.9 metres (6 ft 3 in) in draught. She has a displacement of 75 tons and a complement of 33 personnel. The ship carries one Bofors 40 mm gun of 60 calibers as armament. This patrol craft can be used for coastal patrolling as well as riverine patrolling.

== See also ==
- List of ships of the Bangladesh Coast Guard
- List of historic ships of the Bangladesh Navy
