= CGS Patuakhali =

History

Bangladesh Coast Guard
- Name: CGS Patuakhali
- Builder: Dockyard and Engineering Works Limited
- Commissioned: 1995
- Identification: Pennant number: P 113
- Status: Active

Bangladesh Navy
- Name: BNS Patuakhali
- Commissioned: 1 November 1974
- Decommissioned: 1995
- Identification: Pennant number: P 113
- Fate: Transferred to Bangladesh Coast Guard

General characteristics
- Class & type: Pabna-class patrol boat
- Displacement: 69 tons
- Length: 22.9 m (75 ft 2 in)
- Beam: 6.1 m (20 ft 0 in)
- Draught: 1.9 m (6 ft 3 in)
- Propulsion: 2 Cummins diesel engine; 2 shafts
- Complement: 33 personnel
- Armament: 1 × Bofors 40 mm gun

CGS Patuakhali is a Pabna-class riverine patrol craft of the Bangladesh Coast Guard.

== History ==
The ship was built at Dockyard and Engineering Works Limited, a state-owned ship construction and repair yard at Narayanganj managed by the Bangladesh Navy.

The patrol craft was commissioned into the Bangladesh Navy as BNS Patuakhali on 1 November 1974. After 21 years of service with Bangladesh Navy, in 1995, with the emergence of Bangladesh Coast Guard, the ship was transferred and commissioned into the coast guard as CGS Patuakhali.

== Design ==
The ship is 22.9 metres (75 ft 2 in) in length, 6.1 metres (20 ft 0 in) in breadth and 1.9 metres (6 ft 3 in) in draught. She has a displacement of 69 tons and a complement of 33 personnel. The ship carries one Bofors 40 mm gun of 60 calibres as armament. The patrol craft can be used for both coastal and riverine patrolling.

== See also ==
- List of ships of the Bangladesh Coast Guard
- List of historic ships of the Bangladesh Navy
