= Type 074A landing ship =

Chinese amphibious warfare vessel class

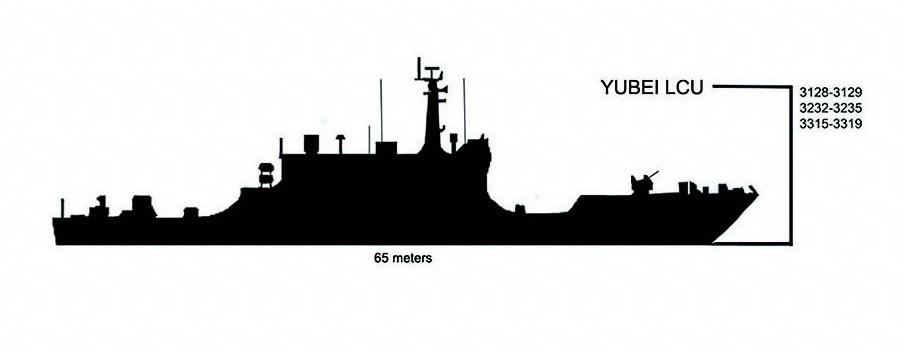

History

China

Class overview
- Name: Type 074A Landing ship medium
- Operators: People's Liberation Army Navy
- Preceded by: Type 074

General characteristics
- Class & type: Yubei class
- Type: Landing Ship Medium
- Displacement: 650 t standard, 800 t full
- Length: 58.4 m
- Beam: 19.4. m
- Draft: 2.7 m
- Propulsion: two diesel engines @ 4900 hp each
- Speed: 18 kn max
- Range: 1000 nmi @ 18 kn
- Endurance: 15 days
- Capacity: 200t
- Complement: 250 fully armed troops
- Crew: 56
- Armament: 2 Type 61 25mm AAA guns

Type 074A landing ship medium with NATO reporting name Yubei class is a new member of Type 74 series LSM, it is unique in that it is catamaran hull design. More than ten are in service by mid 2015, and this ship is the first LSM in PLAN to incorporate infrared stealth feature in that the exhaust is near waterline. A speedboat launching / recovering facility is also added. Type 74A LSM can carry 3 Type 96 or Type 59 tanks, or 6 Type 63 (tank)s, plus a platoon of 70 fully equipped troops, or 250 fully equipped troops.
