= Pabna-class patrol boat =

Bangladesh Coast Guard vessel

Class overview
- Name: Pabna class
- Builders: Dockyard and Engineering Works Limited
- Operators: Bangladesh Navy (former); Bangladesh Coast Guard (active)
- In commission: 1972–present
- Planned: 5
- Completed: 5
- Active: 5

General characteristics
- Displacement: 75 tons
- Length: 22.9 m (75 ft 2 in)
- Beam: 6.1 m (20 ft 0 in)
- Draught: 1.9 m (6 ft 3 in)
- Propulsion: 2 Cummins diesel engines; 2 shafts
- Complement: 33
- Armament: 1 × Bofors 40 mm gun

The Pabna class is a class of riverine patrol craft in service in Bangladesh. The ships were the first ever warships to be built in Bangladesh. They are operated by the Bangladesh Coast Guard.

== History ==
The Pabna-class patrol craft were built at Dockyard and Engineering Works Limited at Narayanganj. These vessels were the first ships of the Bangladesh Navy. The ships were transferred to Bangladesh Coast Guard after its formation in February 1995.

== Design ==
The ships are 22.9 metres (75 ft 2 in) in length, 6.1 metres (20 ft 0 in) in breadth and 1.9 metres (6 ft 3 in) in draught. They have a displacement of 75 tons and a complement of 33 personnel. The ships carry one Bofors 40 mm gun of 60 calibers as armament. The crafts can be used for both coastal and riverine patrol.

== Ships in the class ==
Pennant number	Name	Builder	Commissioned	Status
P 111	BNS Pabna	Dockyard and Engineering Works Limited	1 June 1972	Transferred to Bangladesh Coast Guard in 1995. Serving as CGS Pabna.
P 112	BNS Noakhali	Dockyard and Engineering Works Limited	1 July 1972	Transferred to Bangladesh Coast Guard in 1995. Serving as CGS Noakhali.
P 113	BNS Patuakhali	Dockyard and Engineering Works Limited	1 November 1974	Transferred to Bangladesh Coast Guard in 1995. Serving as CGS Patuakhali.
P 114	BNS Rangamati	Dockyard and Engineering Works Limited	1 June 1977	Transferred to Bangladesh Coast Guard in 1995. Serving as CGS Rangamati.
P 115	BNS Bogra	Dockyard and Engineering Works Limited	1 June 1977	Transferred to Bangladesh Coast Guard in 1995. Serving as CGS Bogra.

== See also ==
- List of historic ships of the Bangladesh Navy
- List of ships of the Bangladesh Coast Guard
