= BNS Tista =

Kraljevica-class patrol boat of the Yugoslav and Bangladesh navies

History

Bangladesh
- Name: BNS Tista
- Builder: Kraljevica Shipyard
- Commissioned: 6 June 1975
- Recommissioned: 1995 (after engine change)
- Decommissioned: 9 November 2022
- Refit: 1995
- Identification: Pennant number: P 315
- Status: Decommissioned

General characteristics
- Class & type: Kraljevica-class
- Displacement: 190 t (190 long tons) standard; 202 t (199 long tons) full load
- Length: 41.0 m (134.5 ft)
- Beam: 6.3 m (21 ft)
- Draught: 2.2 m (7.2 ft)
- Propulsion: 2x MAN V8V 30/38 diesels; 3,300 bhp (2,500 kW)
- Speed: 18 kn (33 km/h; 21 mph)
- Range: 1,000 nmi (1,900 km; 1,200 mi) at 12 kn (22 km/h; 14 mph)
- Complement: 4 officers, 40 other ranks
- Sensors & processing systems: Surface search: Decca 1229; I-band; Sonars: OCU 2; hull-mounted: active; high frequency
- Armament: 2 × Bofors 40 mm L/70 guns; 4 × 20 mm cannon; 2 × 128 mm rocket launchers; 2× Mk 6 depth charge launchers, 2 x depth charge racks

BNS Tista was a Kraljevica-class patrol boat that served with the Bangladesh Navy for nearly half a century.

== Career ==
BNS Tista was built as PBR 505, a Type 501 Kraljevica-class patrol boat for the Yugoslav Navy in 1956. The ship along with her sister ship BNS Karnafuli were acquired from the former Yugoslavia in 1975 and commissioned on 6 June 1975. The ships underwent upgrades from 1995 to 1998. After serving the Bangladesh Navy for around 47 years, BNS Tista was decommissioned from service on 9 November 2022.

== Armament ==
The ship was armed with two Bofors 40 mm L/70 guns and four 20 mm cannon. She also carried two 128 mm rocket launchers and two racks for Mk 6 Projectors for anti-submarine warfare (ASW) operations. She was mainly used as an ASW ship.

== See also ==
- List of historic ships of the Bangladesh Navy
- BNS Karnafuli

== Sources ==
- Baker, III, A. D. (1998). The Naval Institute Guide to Combat Fleets of the World 1998–1999. Annapolis, Maryland, US: Naval Institute Press. ISBN 1-55750-111-4.
- Gardiner, Robert; Chumbley, Stephen (1995). Conway's All The World's Fighting Ships 1947–1995. Annapolis, Maryland, US: Naval Institute Press. ISBN 1-55750-132-7.
