= Sobuj Bangla-class patrol craft =

Ship of Bangladesh

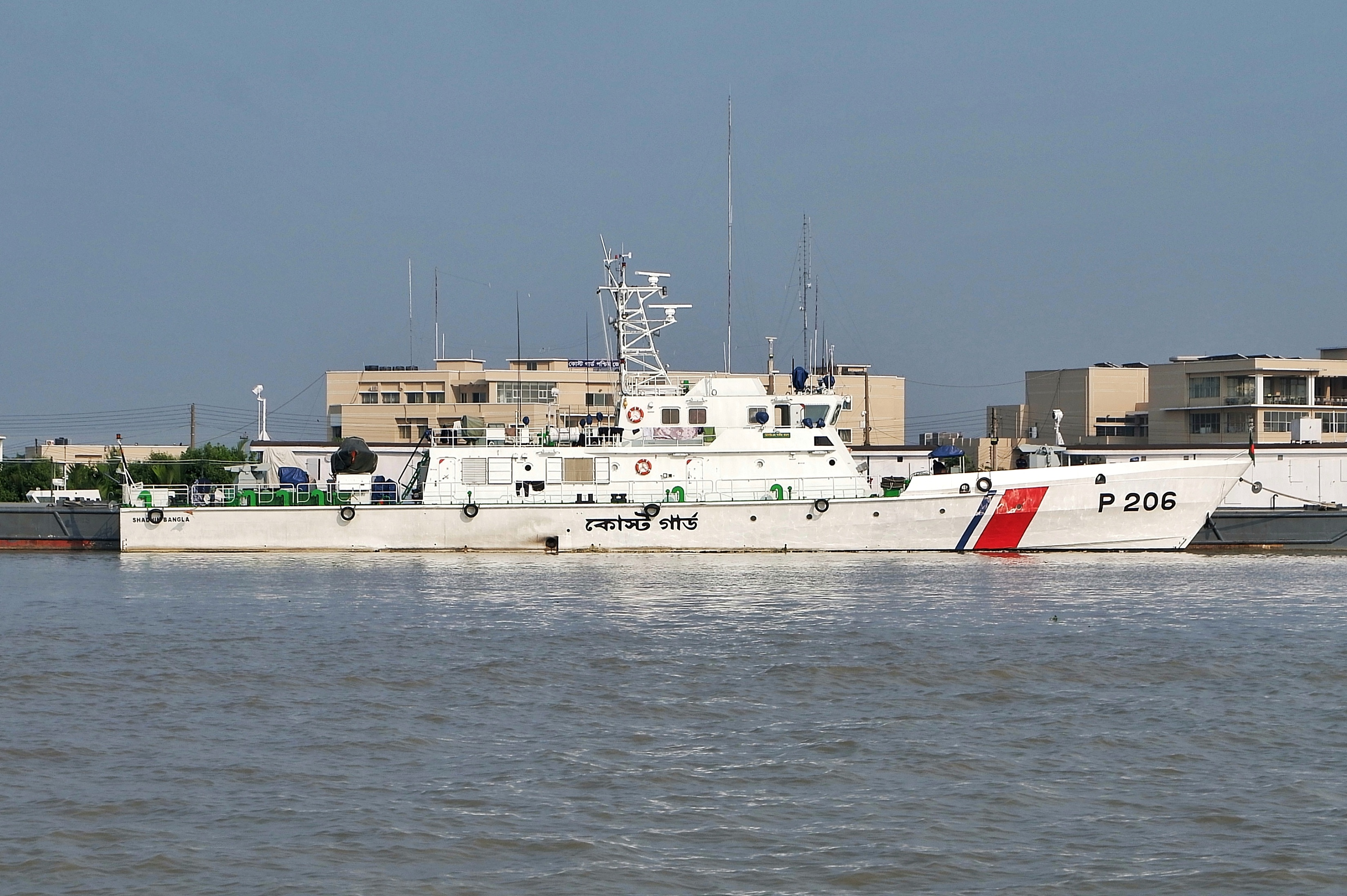

Class overview
- Builders: Dockyard and Engineering Works Limited; Khulna Shipyard
- Operators: Bangladesh Coast Guard
- Built: 2015–2017
- In commission: 5
- Completed: 7

General characteristics
- Type: Inshore patrol vessel
- Displacement: 297 tons
- Length: Batch 1: 51.4 m (169 ft) Batch 2: 50.4 m (165 ft) Batch 3: 52.8 m (173 ft) (oa)
- Beam: 7 m (23 ft)
- Draught: 1.9 m (6.2 ft)
- Propulsion: 2 × DEUTZ 2,240 kW (3,000 hp) diesel, 2 × shafts
- Speed: 23 knots (43 km/h; 26 mph)
- Range: 1,500 nmi (2,800 km; 1,700 mi)
- Complement: 45 personnel
- Armament: Batch 1: Dual auto cannon; 2 × 14.5 mm gun; Batch 2 and 3: 2 × Oerlikon KBA 25 mm autocannon; 2 × 14.5 mm gun

The Sobuj Bangla class is a class of inshore patrol vessel (IPV) family of the Bangladesh Coast Guard built in three batches. This class is a subclass of the Padma-class patrol vessel with similar design but less displacement and different armaments.

== History ==
Sobuj Bangla-class ships are constructed at Dockyard and Engineering Works Limited at Narayanganj. Their design and construction is supported by China Shipbuilding Trading Company (CSTC). They were ordered as part of the Bangladesh government's plan for expansion of the Bangladesh Coast Guard.

The contract for the first two ships were signed in 2015. They were laid down on 21 April 2015. The first ship, Sobuj Bangla was launched on 1 December 2016. The ships were handed over to the Bangladesh Coast Guard on 1 August 2018 and commissioned on 15 November 2020.

On 17 July 2016, Khulna Shipyard was awarded the contract for the construction of three patrol vessels with similar specifications of the first batch for the Bangladesh Coast Guard. The ships were handed over to the Bangladesh Coast Guard on 20 June, 2019 and commissioned on 15 November 2020.

== Design ==
These ships are of 51.4 metres (169 ft) long, 7 metres (23 ft) wide and have a 1.9 metres (6 ft 3 in) draught with a displacement of 297 tonnes. The IPVs are powered by two German DEUTZ diesel engines which can produce 2,240 kW (3,000 hp) driving two shafts for a top speed of 23 knots (43 km/h; 26 mph). They have a complement of 45. The ships can carry out operations at a maximum range of 1,500 nautical miles (2,800 km; 1,700 mi). They can carry out operations in sea state four and can sustain up to sea state six.

== Armament ==
The patrol crafts are armed with two Oerlikon KBA 25 mm guns and two 14.5 mm guns.

== Ships in class ==
| Pennant number | Name | Builder | Ordered | Laid down | Launched | Acquired | Commissioned | Status |
|---|---|---|---|---|---|---|---|---|
| P202 | CGS Sobuj Bangla | Dockyard and Engineering Works Limited | 2015 | 21 April 2015 | 1 December 2016 | 1 August 2018 | 15 November 2020. | Active |
| P203 | CGS Shamol Bangla | Dockyard and Engineering Works Limited | 2015 | 21 April 2015 | | 1 August 2018 | 15 November 2020. | Active |
| P204 | CGS Sonar Bangla | Khulna Shipyard | 17 July 2016 | 2 October 2016 | 23 May 2018 | 20 June 2019 | 15 November 2020 | Active |
| P205 | CGS Aparajeya Bangla | Khulna Shipyard | 17 July 2016 | 2 October 2016 | 5 August 2018 | 20 June 2019 | 15 November 2020 | Active |
| P206 | CGS Shadhin Bangla | Khulna Shipyard | 17 July 2016 | 2 October 2016 | | 20 June 2019 | 15 November 2020 | Active |
| PC207 | CGS Apurbo Bangla | Dockyard and Engineering Works Limited | | 12 December 2017 | | 3 September 2019 | | In Sea Trial |
| PC208 | CGS Joy Bangla | Dockyard and Engineering Works Limited | | 12 December 2017 | | 10 January 2022 | | In Sea Trial |

== See also ==
- List of ships of the Bangladesh Coast Guard
