= BNS Bishkhali (1978) =

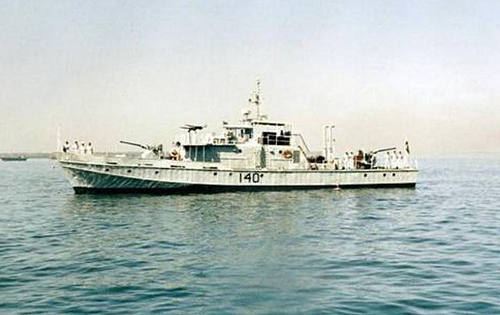
- Her sister ship PNS Rajshahi

History

Pakistan
- Name: Jessore
- Builder: Brooke Marine
- Launched: 1964
- Commissioned: 20 May 1965
- Identification: Pennant number: P-141
- Fate: Sunk in December 1971 and salvaged

History

Bangladesh
- Name: Bishkhali
- Builder: Brooke Marine
- Commissioned: November 23, 1978
- Decommissioned: May 20, 2014
- Home port: Khulna
- Identification: Pennant number: P-311
- Status: Decommissioned

General characteristics
- Displacement: Standard- 115 tons; Full load- 143 tons
- Length: 32.6 m (106 ft 11 in)
- Beam: 6 m (19 ft 8 in)
- Draught: 6.9 m (22 ft 8 in)
- Propulsion: 2 MTU 12 V 538 TB90 diesels; 4,500 hp (m) (3.3 MW) sustained; 2 shafts
- Speed: 24 knots (44 km/h; 28 mph)
- Complement: 30 personnel (4 officers)
- Sensors & processing systems: Racal Decca; I-band.
- Armament: 2 × Breda 40 mm / 70 guns

BNS Bishkhali (formerly known as PNS Jessore) was a large Town-class patrol craft (LPC) of Bangladesh Navy previously operated by Pakistan Navy. After being sunk during the liberation war of 1971, the ship was commissioned into the Bangladesh Navy in November 1978, following post-salvage repairs.

== History ==
During the liberation war of 1971, the naval commandos of Bangladesh sunk the Pakistan Navy Ship PNS Jessore. After the war, the ship was salvaged and extensively repaired at Khulna Shipyard. Then it was commissioned in Bangladesh Navy as BNS Bishkhali on 23 November 1978.

== Career ==
During the service period, the ship served at Khulna under Commodore Commanding BN Khulna (COMKHUL). After serving for around 36 years, on 20 May 2014, she was decommissioned from the Bangladesh Navy. She was decommissioned at Digraj naval base in Mongla, Khulna due to operational limitations.

== Armament ==
The ship was armed with two Breda 40 mm (1.6 in) / 70-calibre guns which can fire at a rate of 300 rounds per minute to a distance 12.5 kilometres (13,700 yd).

== See also ==
- List of historic ships of the Bangladesh Navy
