= Type 648 repair ship =

Chinese submarine repair ship

History

PRC
- Status: Active

General characteristics
- Type: Repair ship (AR)
- Displacement: 1,968 long tons (2,000 t)
- Length: 84 m (275 ft 7 in)
- Beam: 12.4 m (40 ft 8 in)
- Propulsion: Marine Diesel
- Speed: 15.1 kn (28.0 km/h; 17.4 mph)
- Range: 2,000 nmi (3,700 km; 2,300 mi)
- Endurance: 20 days
- Complement: 105
- Sensors & processing systems: Navigation radar
- Electronic warfare & decoys: None
- Armament: Unarmed
- Armour: None
- Aircraft carried: None
- Aviation facilities: None

The Type 648 repair ship is a Chinese submarine repair ship currently in service with the People's Liberation Army Navy (PLAN). It was one of the two units consisting of the proposed mobile repair flotilla, but the floating dry dock with a lifting capacity of 2000 tons was never built, and Type 648 repair ship was the one only completed. Type 648 has received with NATO reporting name Dadao class (大岛, meaning Great Island).

The Type 648 is designed by the 3rd Directorate of the 708th Institute of China State Shipbuilding Corporation (CSSC), which is also more commonly known as China Shipbuilding and Oceanic Engineering Design Academy (中国船舶及海洋工程设计研究) nowadays, after receiving the assignment from PLAN in October 1975. Construction began in July 1980 and was completed in December 1984, and the ship was formally handed over to PLAN in January 1985 with name as Dong-Xiu (东修, meaning East Repair in Chinese) 911. Type 648 was specially designed to repair submarines and has elaborate repair facilities on board. After decades of service and numerous upgrades, the ship remains in active service in the early 2010s.

Specifications:

- Length (m): 84
- Waterline (m): 78.7
- Depth (m): 5.8
- Draft (m): 4
- Beam (m): 12.4
- Displacement (t): 1962
- Speed (kn): 15.1
- Range (nmi): 2000
- Endurance (day): 20
- Crew: 105
- Armament: 4 Type 61 twin 25 mm gun
- Propulsion: 2 D39 diesel engines @ 1360 kW (1850 hp)

Type	Pennant #	Builder	Laid down	Commissioned	Status	Fleet
648	Dong-Xiu 911	Bohai Shipyard	Jul 1980	Jan 1985	Active	East Sea Fleet
