= CGS Aparajeya Bangla =

History

Bangladesh
- Name: CGS Aparajeya Bangla
- Ordered: 17 July 2016
- Builder: Khulna Shipyard
- Laid down: 2 October 2016
- Launched: 5 August 2018
- Acquired: 20 June 2019
- Commissioned: 15 November 2020
- Identification: Pennant number: P 205
- Status: Active

General characteristics
- Class & type: Sobuj Bangla-class patrol vessel
- Displacement: 297 tonnes
- Length: 50.4 metres (165 ft)
- Beam: 7.5 metres (25 ft)
- Draught: 4.1 metres (13 ft)
- Propulsion: 2 shafts, 2 diesels
- Speed: 23 knots (43 km/h)
- Endurance: 7 days
- Boats & landing craft carried: 1 x RIB boat
- Complement: 45 personnel
- Armament: 2 × Oerlikon KBA 25 mm gun; 2 × 14.5 mm Heavy machine gun

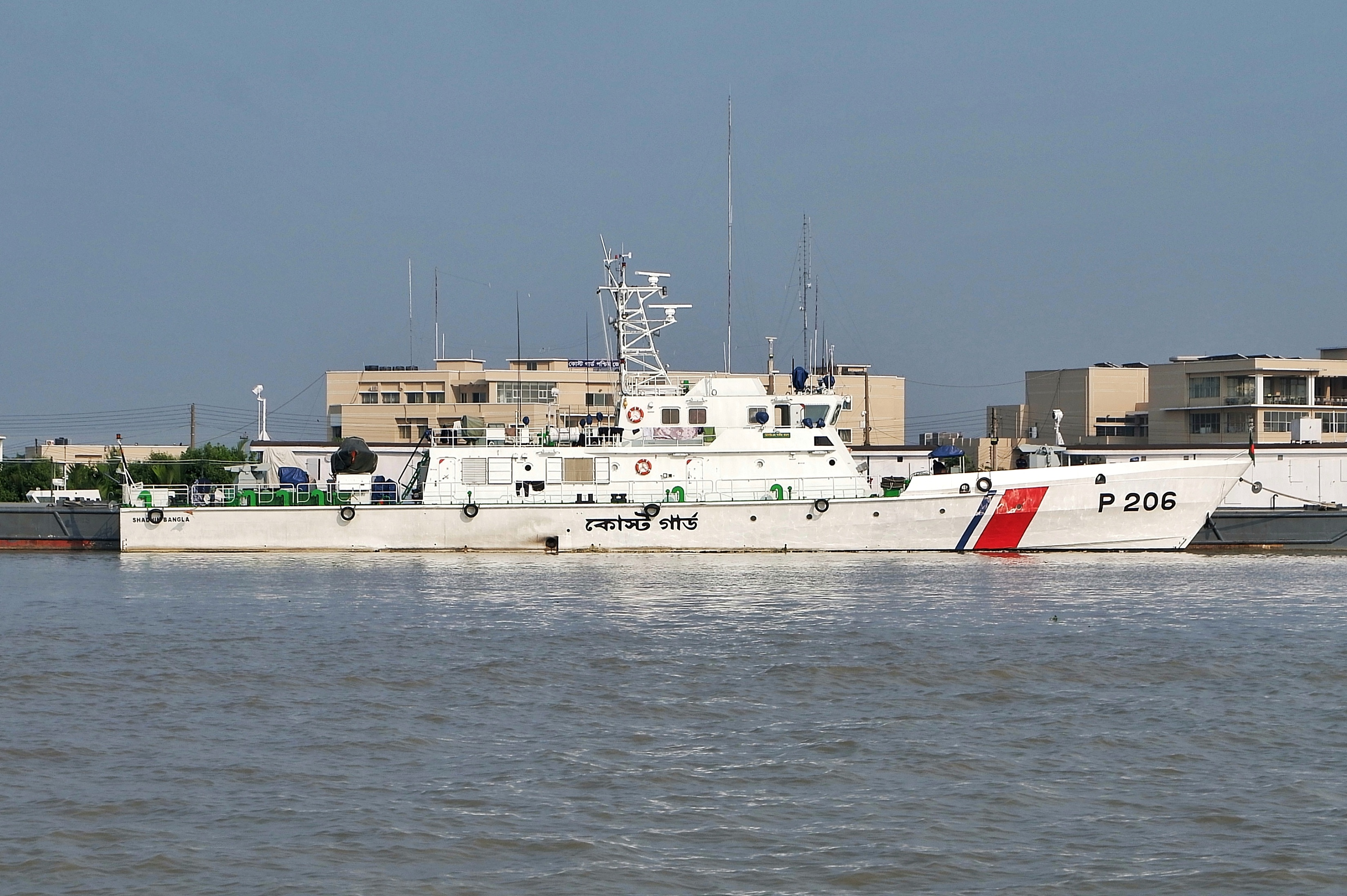

CGS Aparajeya Bangla is a Sobuj Bangla-class inshore patrol vessel, which has served the Bangladesh Coast Guard since 2020.

== Design ==
CGS Aparajeya Bangla is 50.4 metres (165 ft) long, 7.5 metres (25 ft) wide and 4.1 metres (13 ft) high. The vessel has a displacement of 297 tonnes and a top speed of 23 knots (43 km/h). Her complement is 45 persons and can carry out missions lasting up to seven days at a time.

== Armament ==
The ship is armed with two Oerlikon KBA 25 mm guns, one forward and one aft, as well as two 14.5 mm Heavy machine guns.

== See also ==
- List of ships of the Bangladesh Coast Guard
