= BNS Karnafuli =

Patrol boat of the Bangladeshi Navy

History

Bangladesh
- Name: BNS Karnafuli
- Builder: Kraljevica Shipyard
- Commissioned: 6 June 1975
- Recommissioned: 1995 (after engine change)
- Decommissioned: 9 November 2022
- Refit: 1995
- Identification: Pennant number: P 314
- Status: Decommissioned

General characteristics
- Class & type: Kraljevica-class patrol boat
- Displacement: 195 tons standard; 245 tons full load
- Length: 141.4 ft (43.1 m)
- Beam: 20.7 ft (6.3 m)
- Draught: 5.7 ft (1.7 m)
- Propulsion: 2 x MAN V8V 30/38 diesels; 3,300 hp (m) (2.42 MW); 2 x shafts
- Speed: 21 knots (39 km/h; 24 mph)
- Range: 1,500 mi (2,400 km) at 12 knots (22 km/h; 14 mph)
- Complement: 44 personnel (4 officers)
- Sensors & processing systems: Surface search radar: Decca 1229; I-band; Sonars: OCU 2; hull-mounted: active; high frequency
- Armament: 2 × Bofors 40 mm L/70 guns; 4 × 20 mm cannon; 2 × 128 mm rocket launchers; 2 × Mk 6 depth charge launchers, 2 x depth charge racks

BNS Karnafuli was a Kraljevica-class ASW patrol boat in service with the Bangladesh Navy for nearly half a century.

== Armament ==
The ship was armed with two Bofors 40 mm L/70 guns and four 20 mm cannon. It also carried two 128 mm rocket launchers and two racks for Mk 6 Projectors for ASW operations. She was mainly used as an anti-submarine warfare ship in Bangladesh Navy.

== Career ==
The ship along with her sister ship BNS Tista were acquired from the former Yugoslavia in 1975 and commissioned on 6 June 1975. BNS Karnafuli was reduced to reserve in 1988 but was re-engined in 1995 and returned to active service. After serving the Bangladesh Navy for around 47 years, she was decommissioned from service on 9 November 2022.

== See also ==
- List of historic ships of the Bangladesh Navy
- BNS Tista
