= BNS Durdam =

History

Bangladesh
- Name: Durdam
- Builder: Wuhu Shipyard
- Commissioned: 10 November 1983
- Decommissioned: 30 March 2017
- Identification: Pennant number P-8114
- Fate: Scrapped

General characteristics
- Class & type: Type 024 class missile boat
- Displacement: 79 tons
- Length: 79 m (259 ft 2 in)
- Beam: 27 m (88 ft 7 in)
- Draft: 1.8 m (5 ft 11 in)
- Installed power: 4 × Chinese L-12V-180 diesel engines; 4,800 hp (3,600 kW)
- Propulsion: 4 shafts
- Speed: 38 knots (70 km/h; 44 mph)
- Range: 520 nmi (960 km; 600 mi) at 26 kn (48 km/h; 30 mph)
- Complement: 17
- Sensors & processing systems: 1 × Type 352 Square Tie surface search radar
- Armament: 2 × single SY-1 anti-ship missiles; 1 × twin 25 mm (1 in) Type 61 AA gun

BNS Durdam was a China-built Type 024 missile boat of Bangladesh Navy. The ship served Bangladesh Navy from 1983 to 2017.

== Career ==
BNS Durdam was commissioned on 10 November 1983. In the cyclone of 1991, the ship was damaged and later on repaired. She was decommissioned from the Bangladesh Navy on 30 March 2017. Later on she was scrapped.

== Design ==
The ship carried two SY-1 anti-ship missiles and a twin-gun mount for the 25 mm (1 in) Type 61 anti-aircraft gun. For surface search, it had a Type 352 Square Tie radar. It used the Chinese copy of Soviet M50 engine called L-12V-180 engines which could run the ship at a top speed of 38 knots (70 km/h; 44 mph).

== Bibliography ==
- Saunders, Stephen, ed. (2004). Jane's Fighting Ships 2004–2005. Coulsdon, UK: Jane's Information Group. ISBN 0-7106-2623-1.
