= BNS Durbar =

History

Bangladesh
- Name: BNS Durbar
- Builder: Wuhu Shipyard
- Commissioned: 6 April 1983
- Decommissioned: 30 March 2017
- Identification: Pennant number P-8111
- Fate: Scrapped

General characteristics
- Class & type: Type 024 class missile boat
- Displacement: 79 tons
- Length: 79 m (259 ft 2 in)
- Beam: 27 m (88 ft 7 in)
- Draft: 1.8 m (5 ft 11 in)
- Installed power: 4 × Chinese L-12V-180 diesel engines; 4,800 hp (3,600 kW)
- Propulsion: 4 shafts
- Speed: 38 knots (70 km/h; 44 mph)
- Range: 520 nmi (960 km; 600 mi) at 26 kn (48 km/h; 30 mph)
- Complement: 17
- Sensors & processing systems: 1 × Type 352 Square Tie surface search radar
- Armament: 2 × SY-1 missiles; 2 × Type 61 25 mm guns

BNS Durbar was a Type 024 missile boat of Bangladesh Navy. The ship served Bangladesh Navy from 1983 to 2017.

== Career ==
BNS Durbar was commissioned on 6 April 1983. In the cyclone of 1991, the ship was damaged and later on repaired. In '"Exercise Sea Thunder 2014", Durbar fired SY-1 missile. She was decommissioned from the Bangladesh Navy on 30 March 2017. Later on she was scrapped.

== Design ==
The ship carried two SY-1 anti-ship missiles and two Type 61 25 mm guns. For surface search, it had a Type 352 Square Tie Radar. It carried the Chinese copy of Soviet M50 engine called L-12V-180 engines which could run the ship at a top speed of 38 knots (70 km/h; 44 mph).
