= BNS Shaheed Daulat =

Two ships of Bangladesh Navy carried the name BNS Shaheed Daulat:

- BNS Shaheed Daulat (1982), a Type 062 class gunboat acquired from China.
- BNS Shaheed Daulat (2022), an indigenous Padma-class patrol vessel, launched in 2022.
