= Type 074 landing ship =

Class of Chinese landing craft

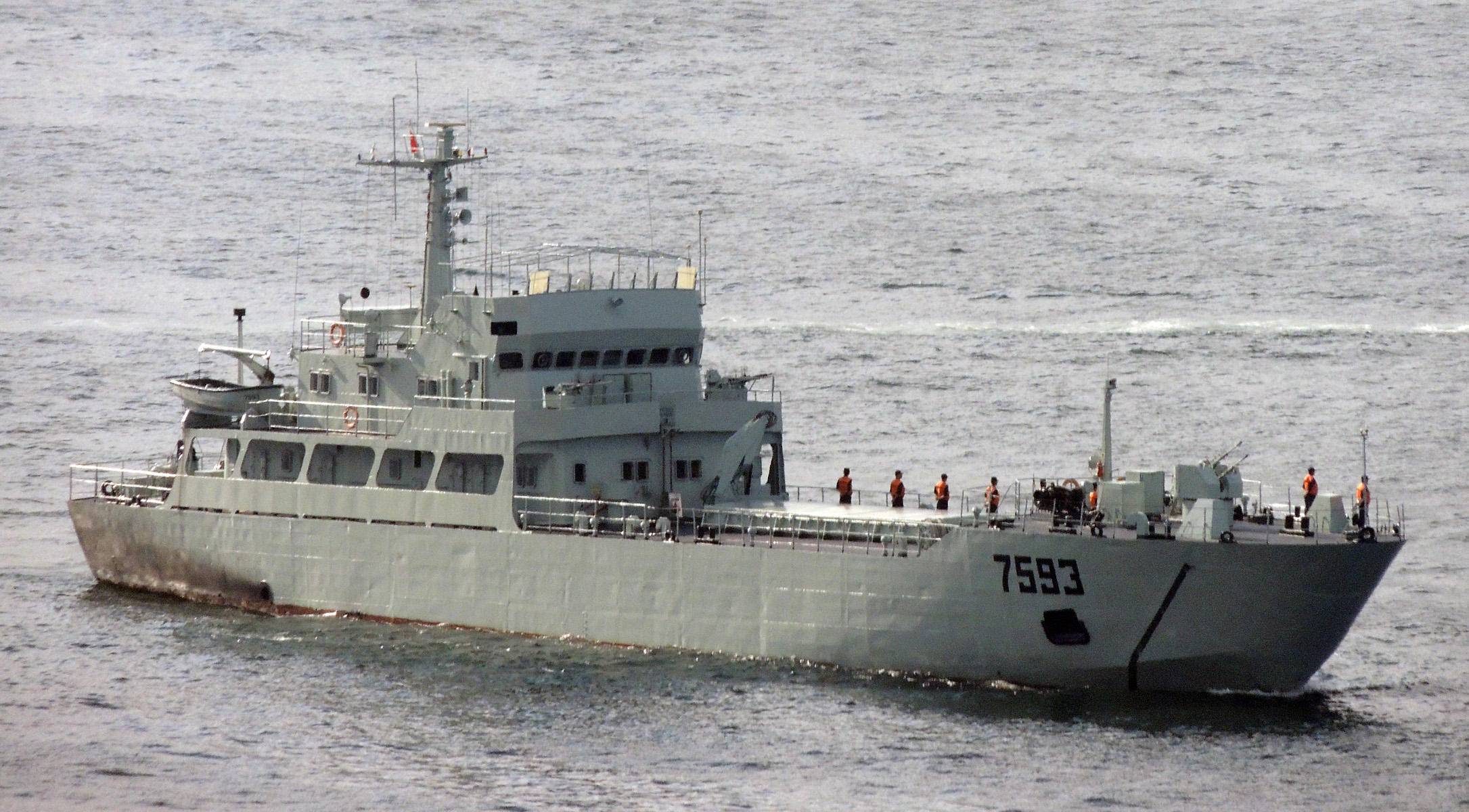
- Type 074-class landing ship (Yuhai class)

Class overview
- Name: Yuhai-class
- Builders: Wuhu Shipyard Wuhu, Anhui
- Operators: People's Liberation Army Navy; Sri Lanka Navy; Bangladesh Army
- Preceded by: Type 079 (Yuling-class)
- Succeeded by: Type 074A
- In commission: 1995-present
- Completed: 12 PLAN; 1 Sri Lanka; 2 Bangladesh
- Active: 12 PLAN; 1 Sri Lanka; 2 Bangladesh

General characteristics
- Type: Landing ship medium
- Displacement: 800 tonnes (full)
- Length: 58.4m
- Beam: 10.4m
- Draft: 2.7m
- Installed power: 4,900hp
- Propulsion: Two diesels
- Speed: 18 knots
- Capacity: 2 tanks
- Troops: 350
- Complement: 56
- Sensors & processing systems: 1 x I-band navigational radar
- Armament: 3 x Type 61 25mm AAA guns

The Type 074 landing ship (NATO reporting name: Yuhai-class) is a class of landing ship medium (LSM) of the People's Liberation Army Navy. They were built at Wuhu Shipyard of Wuhu, Anhui from 1995 to 2000. Although entering service in the mid-1990s, the origin of Type 074 dates to almost three decades earlier in the mid-1960s, and Type 074 is the result of experience learned from around half a dozen models earlier.

== Background ==
The preceding Type 079 landing ship suffers from inherit design flaws so that in order to achieve ease of production, it could be mass-produced, the hull shape was a very simply flat bottom design, and this is not good for sailing in poor weathers. As a result, PLAN issued a request of upgrade of the Type 079 in the 1990s. However, as study progressed, it was discovered that in order to reach the requirement, major redesign is needed, and the cost would be prohibitive. The only alternative was to enlarge the successful design of the older Type 271 landing ships, hence Type 074 was borne as a cross between the Type 079 and the Type 271, with the upgraded equipment of the former installed on an enlarged hull of the latter.

== Design ==
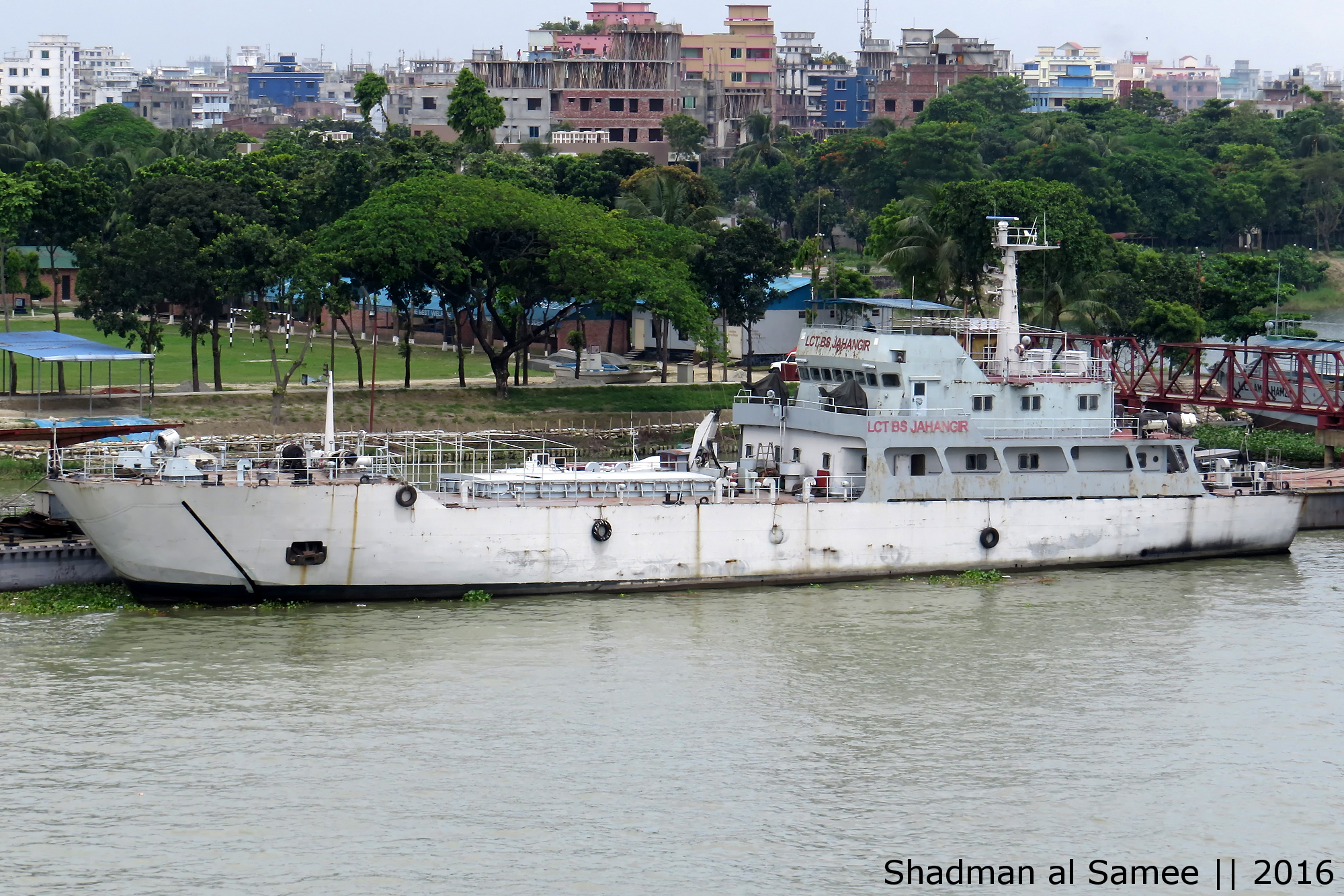
Type 074 landing ship BS Jahangir of Bangladesh Army

This class of landing ship is capable of making oceanic voyages in moderate sea states. They are used for tactical beach lodgement, and can carry up to 100 tonnes of cargo. Indicative maximum loads include either 2 main battle tanks, or 6 light amphibious tanks, or 350 fully equipped troops. The ships of this class are fitted with three Type 61 25mm AAA guns|Type 61 dual-25mm antiaircraft artillery guns. Some units are also fitted with Type 81H 122mm multiple rocket launchers. Although on board equipment of Type 074 is derived from that of Type 079, advancement in Chinese technological and industrial capability enabled the adaptation of automation, which significantly reduced the number of crew needed almost by a half, down to 56 from the original 109 of Type 079.

- Displacement: 800 tonnes (full)
- Length: 58.4 m
- Beam: 10.4 m
- Draft: 2.7 m
- Speed: 18 kt
- Propulsion: 2 MAN AG diesel engines or its Chinese copy @ 4,900 hp with 2 shafts
- Complement: 56
- Lift capacity: 2 main battle tanks plus 250 troops
- Armament: Two 25 mm guns (II x 1)
- Radar: One I-band navigational radar

== Ships of the class ==
Pennant Number	Builder	Status
3111	Wuhu Shipyard, Wuhu	In Service
3113	Wuhu Shipyard, Wuhu	In Service
3115	Wuhu Shipyard, Wuhu	In Service
3116	Wuhu Shipyard, Wuhu	In Service
3117	Wuhu Shipyard, Wuhu	In Service
3229	Wuhu Shipyard, Wuhu	In Service
3244	Wuhu Shipyard, Wuhu	In Service
7593	Wuhu Shipyard, Wuhu	Decommissioned
7594	Wuhu Shipyard, Wuhu	Decommissioned
7595	Wuhu Shipyard, Wuhu	Decommissioned
3357	Wuhu Shipyard, Wuhu	In Service
3358	Wuhu Shipyard, Wuhu	In Service
3369		In Service

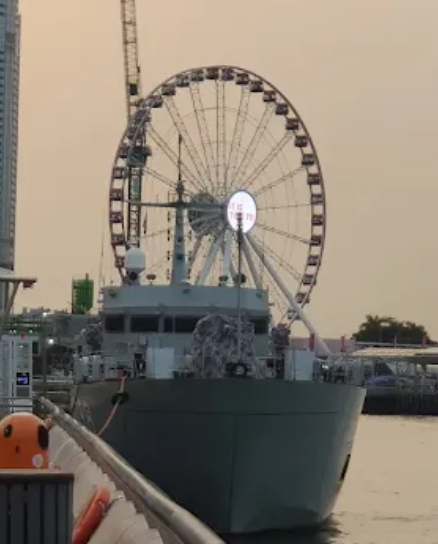
No 3358 at the Central Military Dock of the HK garrison

== Operators ==
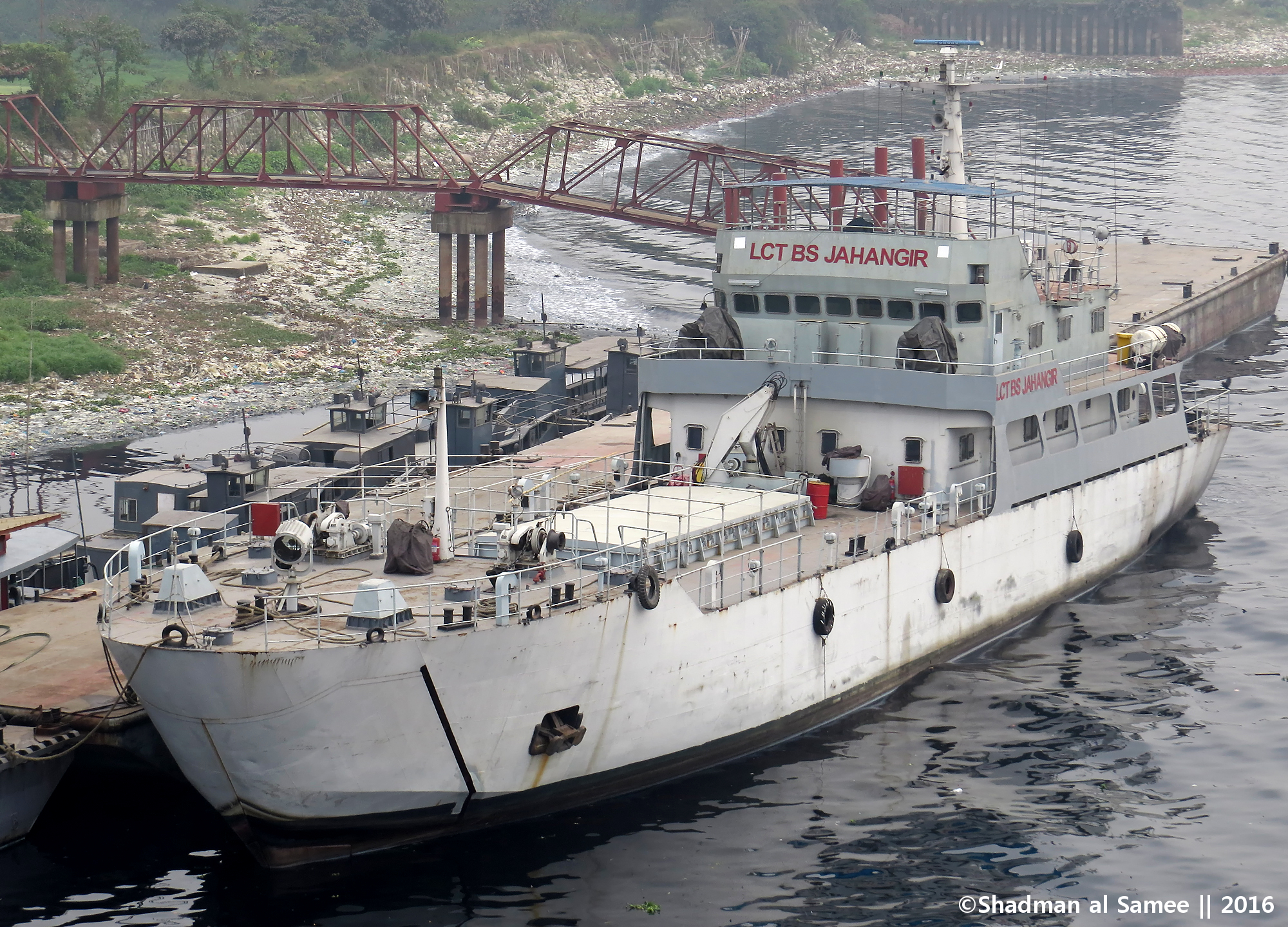
Type 074 landing ship of Bangladesh Army

- Bangladesh Army - 2 in service.
- People's Liberation Army Navy - Estimated to be around 12 in active service.
- Sri Lanka Navy - 1 in service.
- Algerian National Navy - unknown in service.

== Type 074A Yubei-class landing ship ==
The Type 074A Yubei-class landing ship features a totally different design to the base Type 074. It has a wave-piercing catamaran hull among other changes. Eight are in active service.

== See also ==
- People's Liberation Army Navy Surface Force
