= Type 067 landing craft =

Type 067 utility landing craft (LCU)

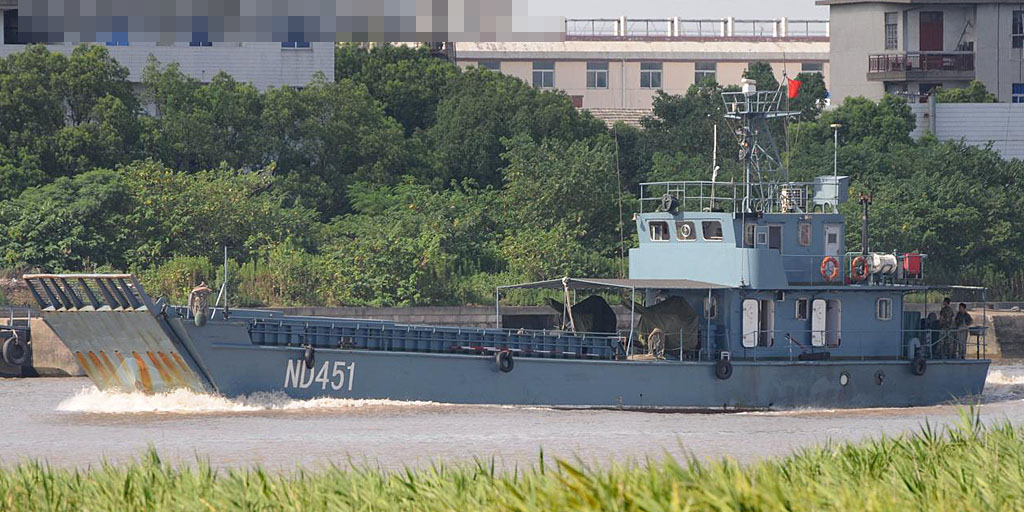

Class overview
- Name: Type 067
- Builders: Huangzhou Shipyard
- Operators: People's Liberation Army Navy; Cameroon Navy; Sri Lanka Navy
- Built: 1968 - 1992
- In commission: c. 1970 - present
- Completed: 280

General characteristics
- Type: Utility landing craft
- Displacement: 137 tonnes (full load)
- Length: 28.6 metres (94 ft)
- Beam: 5.4 metres (18 ft)
- Draught: 1.5 metres (4 ft 11 in)
- Propulsion: 2 x Type 12V150 diesel engines; 2 shafts; Total output: 600 hp (450 kW)
- Speed: 12 knots (22 km/h; 14 mph)
- Range: 500 nautical miles (930 km; 580 mi) at 10 knots (19 km/h; 12 mph)
- Capacity: 46 tonnes
- Complement: 12
- Sensors & processing systems: Fuji navigation radar
- Armament: 2 x twin 14.5 mm machine guns

The Type 067 (NATO reporting name: Yunnan) is a class of utility landing craft (LCU) of the People's Republic of China's People's Liberation Army Navy (PLAN). Production ran from 1968 to 1972, possibly restarting by 1982, and ending in 1992.

== Operators ==
Cameroon

Cameroon received two from China in 2002.

China

By 2015 most were in reserve or in non-naval service.

Sri Lanka

Sri Lanka received one from China in 1991 and another in 1995.

== Sources ==
- Saunders, Stephan, ed. (2015). Jane's Fighting Ships 2015-2016. Jane's Information Group. ISBN 978-0710631435.
- Wertheim, Eric (2013). The Naval Institute Guide to Combat Fleets of the World: Their Ships, Aircraft, and Systems (16 ed.). Annapolis, Maryland: Naval Institute Press. ISBN 978-1591149545.
