= Type 61 25 mm AAA gun =

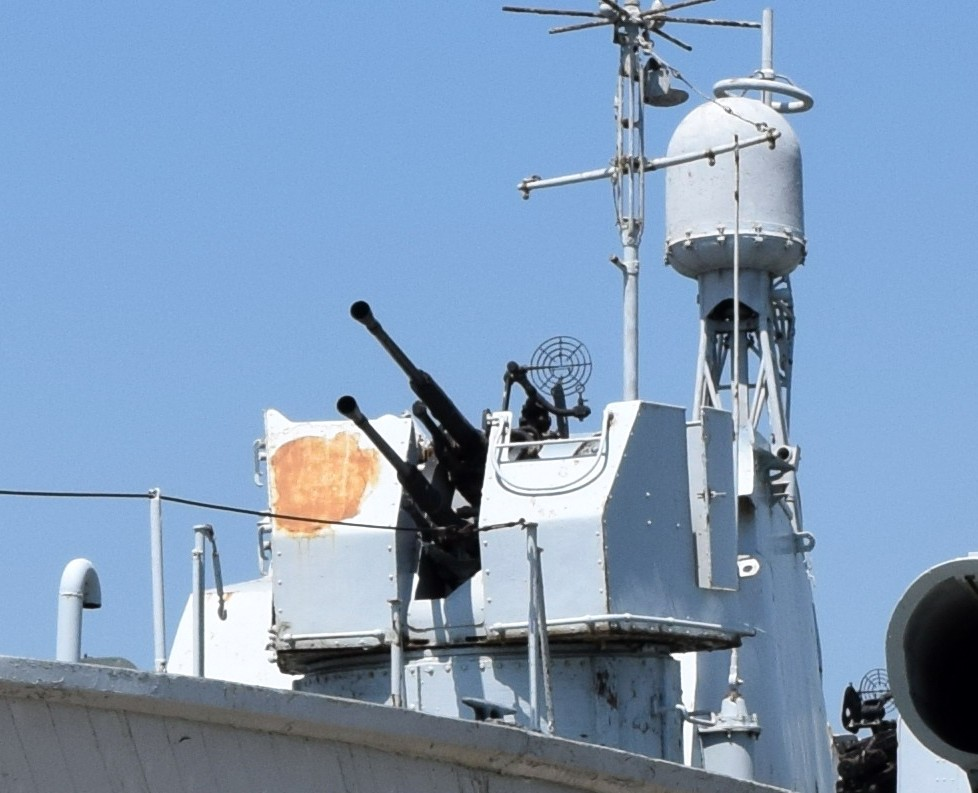
- A decommissioned double barreled Type 61 25 mm naval gun system at a military museum
- Type: Anti-aircraft gun
- Place of origin: China

Service history
- In service: 1966–present
- Used by: See users
- Wars: First Indochina War; Vietnam War

Production history
- Designed: 1961
- Produced: 1966

Specifications
- Barrel length: 1.5 m (4 ft 11 in) L/60
- Crew: 1
- Shell: 25 x 218 mm SR
- Caliber: 25 mm (0.98 in)
- Barrels: Single or dual
- Elevation: -10° ~ +85°
- Traverse: 360°
- Rate of fire: Compact: 800~900 round/min
- Muzzle velocity: 900 m/s (3,000 ft/s)
- Effective firing range: 2,700 m (8,900 ft)
- Maximum firing range: 3,000 m (3,300 yd)
- Feed system: Magazine
- Sights: Optical

The Type 61 25 mm AAA gun is an anti-aircraft gun produced and used by China. It is manually operated by a single crew with an optical sight. The development began in 1961 and the batch production began in 1966. There were both land based and naval variants produced. It is the Chinese version of the Soviet 2M-3 gun.

== Users ==
- Bangladesh
  - Several types of patrol ships.
- China
  - Beihai class gunboat
  - Type 010 minesweepers
  - Type 021-class missile boat
  - Type 024 missile boat
  - Type 037 corvette
  - Type 062 class gunboat
  - Type 648 repair ship
  - Type 067 landing craft utility
  - Type 072 landing ship
  - Type 074 landing ship
  - Type 074 landing ship medium
  - Type 073 landing ship medium
  - Type 079 landing ship medium
