= Type 024 missile boat =

Chinese-built small missile boat

Type 024
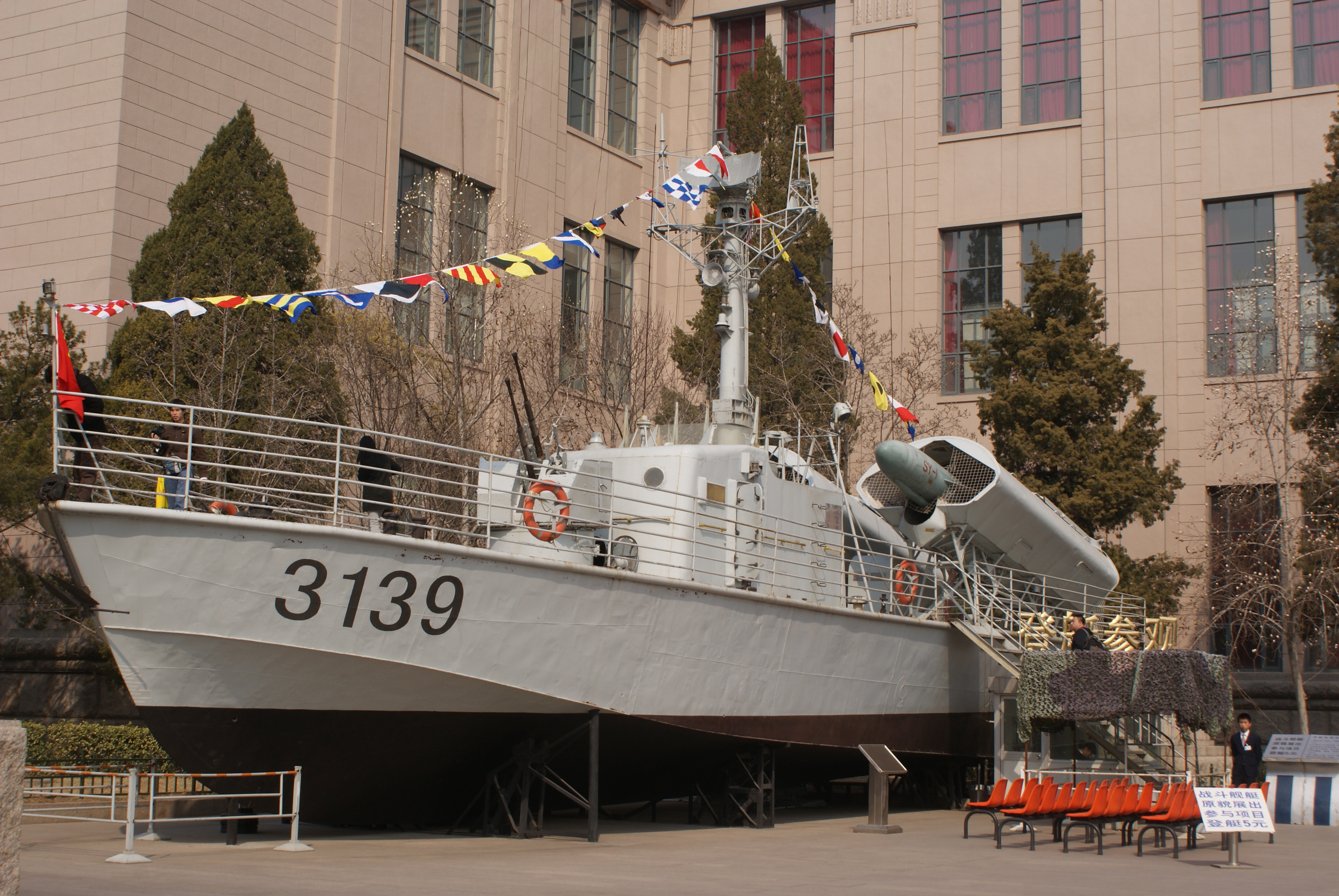

Class overview
- Builders: Wuhu Shipyard
- Preceded by: Komar class
- Succeeded by: Osa class
- Subclasses: Heku class; Homa class
- Completed: 80 (approx.)

General characteristics
- Displacement: 79.2 tons
- Length: 27 m (89 ft)
- Beam: 6.3 m (21 ft)
- Draft: 1.8 m (5 ft 11 in)
- Installed power: 4 × Soviet M50 or Chinese L-12V-180 diesel engines @ 4,800 hp (3,600 kW)
- Propulsion: 4 shafts
- Speed: 37.5 kn (69.5 km/h; 43.2 mph)
- Range: 500 nmi (930 km; 580 mi) @ 24 kn (44 km/h; 28 mph); 400 nmi (740 km; 460 mi) @ 30 kn (56 km/h; 35 mph)
- Complement: 17
- Sensors & processing systems: 1 × Type 352 Square Tie Surface search radar
- Armament: 2 × Silkworm missiles or; 2 × C-101 supersonic anti-ship missiles; 2 × Type 61 25 mm guns (II x 2)
- Notes: Worldwide Equipment Guide 2011

The Type 024 missile boat is a Chinese built small missile boat armed with two anti-ship missiles. Two versions were developed. Although most have been placed in reserve, dozens remain in active service. Those in active service have been rearmed with C-101 supersonic anti-ship missiles.

== Heku class ==
The Heku class is the major version of Type 024 missile boat and it is also known as Hegu class, Hoku class, Hogu class, Hougu class and Houku class, depending on spelling and pronunciation. This class is the Chinese steel-hulled improvement over the original wooden-hulled Soviet Komar-class missile boat. The boat was designed by the 701st Institute at Wuhu while the missile launcher was designed by the 713th Institute. Since the delivery of the first unit by Wuhu Shipyard, around 80 were built in total, including export units.

== Homa class ==
In addition to the development of the Heku class missile boat, another single unit of Type 024 missile boat with hydrofoils was also developed. This boat is called Homa class missile boat, but the design proved to be less satisfactory, and after serving in the People's Liberation Army Navy for evaluation, the unit was retired.

== Operators ==
=== Hegu ===
Bangladesh

- Bangladesh Navy – 5 boats acquired in 1983-1992, all decommissioned.

China

- People's Liberation Army Navy

Egypt

- Egyptian Navy – 6 boats acquired in 1984.

Pakistan

- Pakistan Navy – 4 boats acquired in 1981, all decommissioned.

=== Homa ===
China

- People's Liberation Army Navy
