= Dockyard and Engineering Works =

Bangladeshi ship construction company

Dockyard and Engineering Works Limited
- Type: State-owned
- Industry: Shipbuilding; Ship engineering
- Founded: 1926; 100 years ago
- Headquarters: Narayanganj, Bangladesh
- Key people: Admiral Mohammad Nazmul Hassan, Chairman; Commodore Mohammed Faizul Hoque, (C), NGP, ndc, psc, BN Managing Director
- Products: Naval ships Landing craft Tankers; Patrol Boats; Survey vessels
- Owner: Bangladesh Navy
- Website: http://www.dewbn.gov.bd

Dockyard and Engineering Works (DEW) Limited is a ship construction and repair yard at Narayanganj, Bangladesh, owned by the Government of Bangladesh under Ministry of Defence and managed by the Bangladesh Navy. The yard built many small to medium-sized patrol boats for the Bangladesh Coast Guard and landing craft for the Bangladesh Navy.

== History ==
The shipyard was founded in 1926. Initially, it was a profit-making institution which continued after the independence of Bangladesh. But it experienced a period of loss starting from the 1990s. As a result, it was laid off in 2002. On 7 December 2006, the yard was handed over to the Bangladesh Navy. From then, it is regaining its standard. From 1972 to 1977, this shipyard built the Pabna Class riverine patrol boats, which are the first Bangladesh-made warships.

== Naval projects ==
- Pabna Class riverine patrol boats
- Shobuj Bangla class inshore patrol vessels
- Fast Patrol Boats
- Harbour patrol boats
- Landing craft tank
- X-12 patrol boats

== See also ==
- Chittagong Dry Dock Limited
- Khulna Shipyard
- Shipbuilding in Bangladesh
- Radiant Shipyard Limited
