= Shipyard =

Place where ships are built and repaired

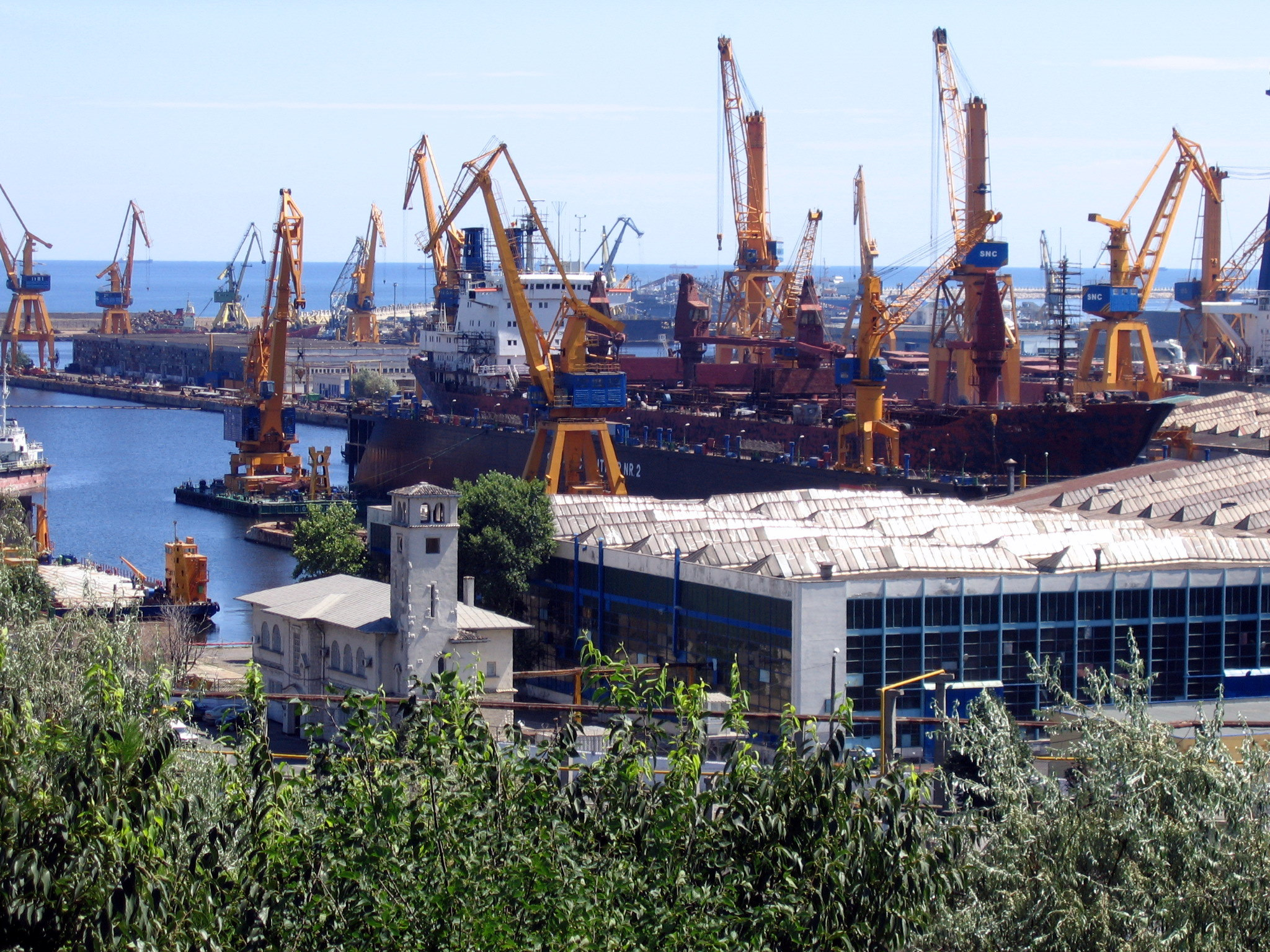
Constanța Shipyard, Romania

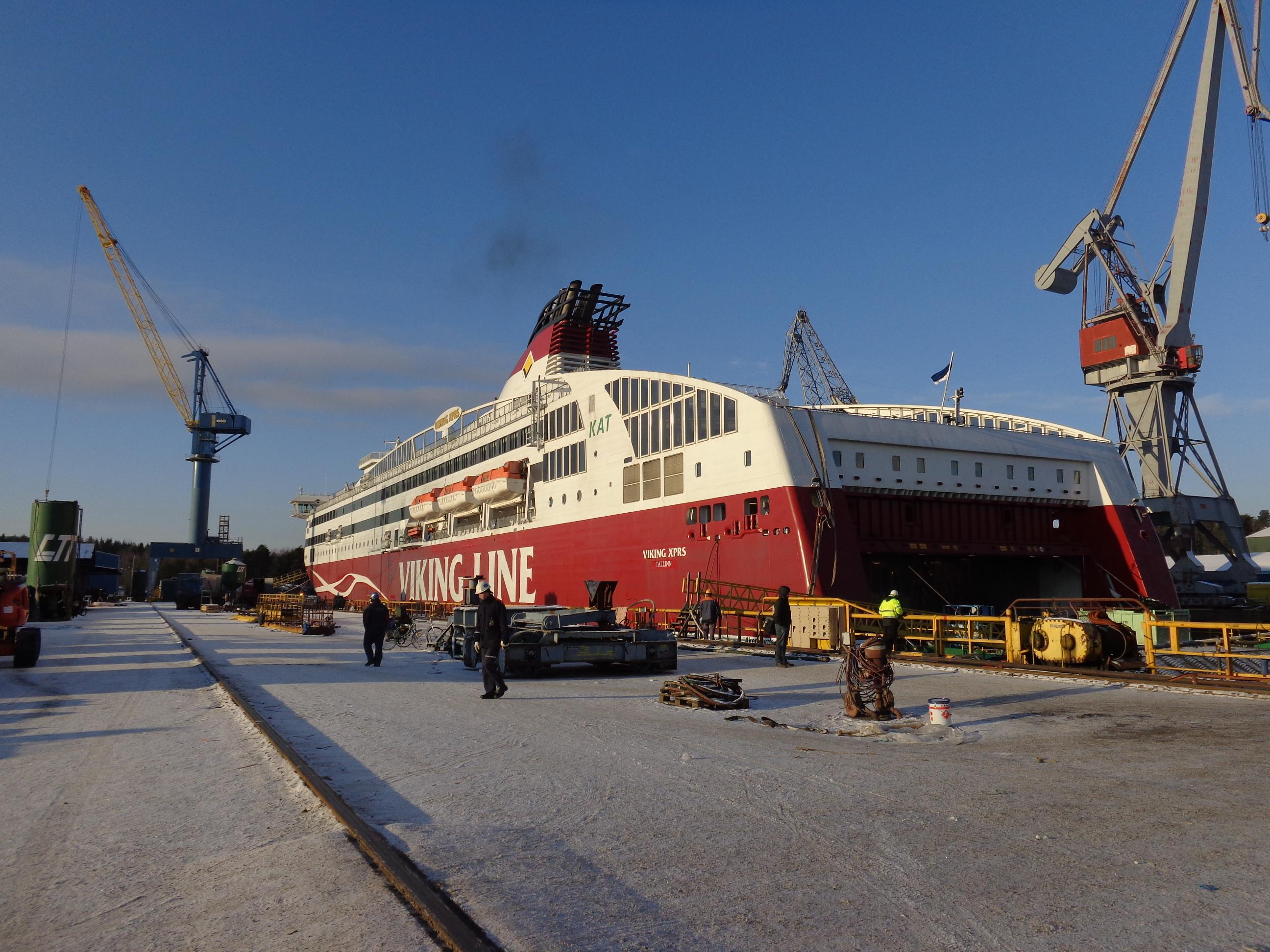
Turku Repair Yard, Finland

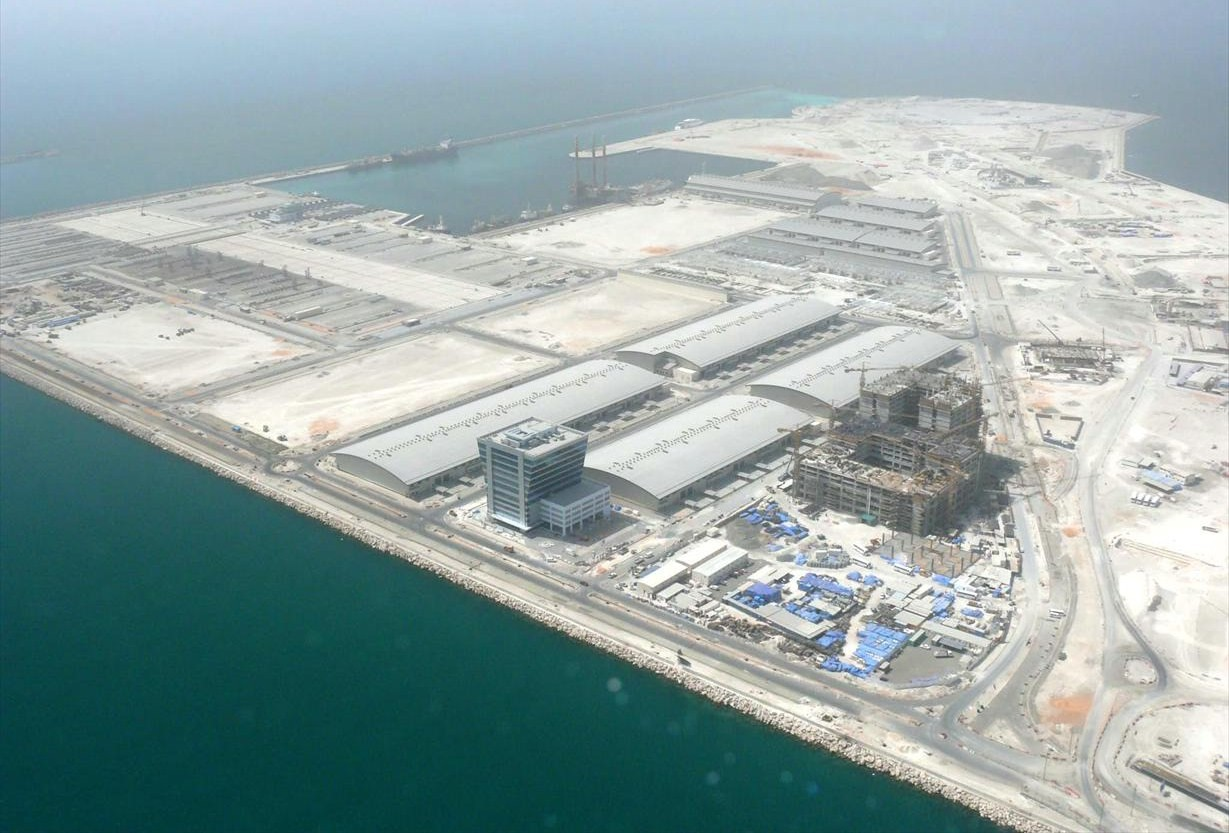
Dubai Maritime City, Dubai, UAE

A shipyard, also called a dockyard or boatyard, is a place where ships are built and repaired. These can be yachts, military vessels, cruise liners or other cargo or passenger ships. Compared to shipyards, which are sometimes more involved with original construction, dockyards are sometimes more linked with maintenance and basing activities. The terms are routinely used interchangeably, in part because the evolution of dockyards and shipyards has often caused them to change or merge roles.

Countries with large shipbuilding industries include Australia, Brazil, Canada, China, Croatia, Denmark, Finland, France, Germany, India, Ireland, Italy, Japan, the Netherlands, Norway, the Philippines, Poland, Romania, Russia, Singapore, South Korea, Spain, Sweden, Taiwan, Turkey, the United Arab Emirates, Ukraine, the United Kingdom, the United States and Vietnam. The shipbuilding industry is more fragmented in Europe than in Asia where countries tend to have fewer, larger companies. Many naval vessels are built or maintained in shipyards owned or operated by the national government or navy.

Shipyards are constructed near the sea or tidal rivers to allow easy access for their ships. The United Kingdom, for example, has shipyards on many of its rivers.

The site of a large shipyard will contain many specialised cranes, dry docks, slipways, dust-free warehouses, painting facilities and extremely large areas for fabrication of the ships. After a ship's useful life is over, it makes its final voyage to a ship-breaking yard, often on a beach in South Asia. Historically ship-breaking was carried out in drydock in developed countries, but high wages and environmental regulations have resulted in movement of the industry to third-world regions.

== History ==
The oldest structure sometimes identified as a dockyard (Note: An alternative classification describes the structure as an irrigation tank.) was built c. 2400 BC by the Indus Valley civilisation in the Harappan port city of Lothal (in present-day Gujarat, India). Lothal engineers accorded high priority to the creation of a dockyard and a warehouse to serve the purposes of maritime trade. The name Naupactus, an ancient Greek city on the Gulf of Corinth, means "shipyard" (combination of the Greek words ναύς naus: "ship, boat"; and πήγνυμι pêgnumi, pegnymi: "builder, fixer"). Naupactus' reputation in this field extended back into legendary times – the site is traditionally identified by Greek authors such as Ephorus and Strabo as the place where a fleet was said to have been built by the legendary Heraclidae Other early historical shipyards include Tel Abu Saifi, in the Northern Sinai, a 4th-century BCE, Ptolemaic Era, Egyptian dockyard, with two dry docks. Narni was a shipyard of Ancient Rome.

In the Spanish city of Barcelona, the Drassanes shipyards were active from at least the mid-13th century until the 18th century, although at times they served as a barracks for troops as well as an arsenal. During their time of operation the Drassanes were continuously changed, rebuilt and modified, but two original towers and part of the original eight construction-naves remain today. From the 14th century, several hundred years before the Industrial Revolution, ships were the first items to be manufactured in a factory – in the Venice Arsenal of the Venetian Republic in present-day Italy. The Arsenal apparently mass-produced nearly one ship every day using pre-manufactured parts and assembly lines. At its height in the 16th century the enterprise employed 16,000 people. Spain built component ships of the Great Armada of 1588 at ports such as Algeciras or Málaga. In the 17th and 18th centuries, shipyards developed in complexity, with yards such as Blackwall Yard (1614 to 1987), the Scotts Shipbuilding and Engineering Company in Greenock, Scotland (1711–1984) and the Kraljevica Shipyard (1729 and still operating) being established. Havana was long the only dockyard in the Caribbean during the colonial period, the Santísima Trinidad, the largest warship of its time, was built there in 1769. Royal Naval Dockyards in the UK also expanded at this time, (including Woolwich, Deptford, Chatham, Portsmouth and Devonport), Gibraltar, Bombay, Bermuda, Hong Kong and elsewhere worldwide. Similarly, other countries in this period include the Nantes-Indret yard in France (established in 1771 it built ships for the American Revolution including the Deane), Charlestown Navy Yard, later Boston Navy Yard, Boston, Massachusetts (1800 to 1974), the Navy Island, Ontario, Canada (French in the 18th century, then British 1763 to War of 1812), the Philadelphia Naval Shipyard (1799 to 1995), at two locations, and the Portsmouth Naval Shipyard, located on Maine-New Hampshire border (1800 to present, making it the oldest continuously operating shipyard of the US Navy).

The Industrial Revolution saw the creation of many new shipyards around the world. In the UK, these included Thames Ironworks and Shipbuilding Co. Ltd (1837 to 1912), William Denny and Brothers in Dumbarton, Scotland (1840 to 1963), John Brown & Company, Scotland (1851 to 1972), Swan Hunter (1880 to 2006), Harland & Wolff – (1861 - still a working yard) and Cammell Laird (1828, still a working yard). In Europe, other examples include Blohm+Voss (1877) where Bismarck was constructed (still a major yard). Ulstein Verft in Norway was established in 1917 (still a working yard under the Ulstein Group). In France, Chantiers de l'Atlantique (STX France) was established in 1861 (and is still a working yard). 3. Maj was one of the largest shipyard in the Mediterranean, established in 1892 in Rijeka (it is still a working yard). SLKB Komarno (Komárno) – Slovak Shipyard Komárno was another European shipyard on the Danube (established in 1898). Jean Street Shipyard (1843–present) is the oldest continually operated shipyard in the U.S. Located on the Hillsborough River in Tampa, Florida. Gloucester Marine Railways in the US (1859–present) is the oldest working shipyard in New England, being located on Rocky Neck in Gloucester, Massachusetts.

During the late Industrial Revolution, British shipyards were among the largest in the world, including Harland & Wolff in Belfast, John Brown & Company at Clydebank (Glasgow) and Swan Hunter at Wallsend (Tyne). By the 20th century, large shipyards were built during conflicts such as the First World War and Second World War. The Sun Shipbuilding & Drydock Co. in Chester, Pennsylvania was the largest shipyard in the world by 1945, employing some 40,000 workers and building hundreds of ships during the Second World War. Other examples of historical US yards include Mare Island Naval Shipyard, Mare Island, California (1854 to 1996), New York Naval Shipyard (NYNSY), also known as the Brooklyn Navy Yard, the New York Navy Yard, and United States Navy Yard, New York (1801 to 1966), San Francisco Naval Shipyard, later Hunters Point Naval Shipyard, then Treasure Island Naval Station Hunters Point Annex (1941 to 1994) and Long Beach Naval Shipyard (1943 to 1997).

New shipyards were established after the war, a prominent example being the Gdańsk Shipyard in 1945, the birthplace of Solidarity Movement – (still a working yard). In the late 20th century, shipbuilding in countries such as the US and UK declined, with yards closing and new shipyards instead expanding in countries such as Japan, South Korea and China. By the early 21st century, China became the worlds leading shipbuilder, with approximately 50% of global tonnage build at Chinese shipyards in 2023. Since the early 2020s, shipyard capacity, design and infrastructure is changing in light of technological change and as the result of regulatory changes from the International Maritime Organization requiring ships to be built to operate more efficiently and with less pollution.

== Shipyard work ==
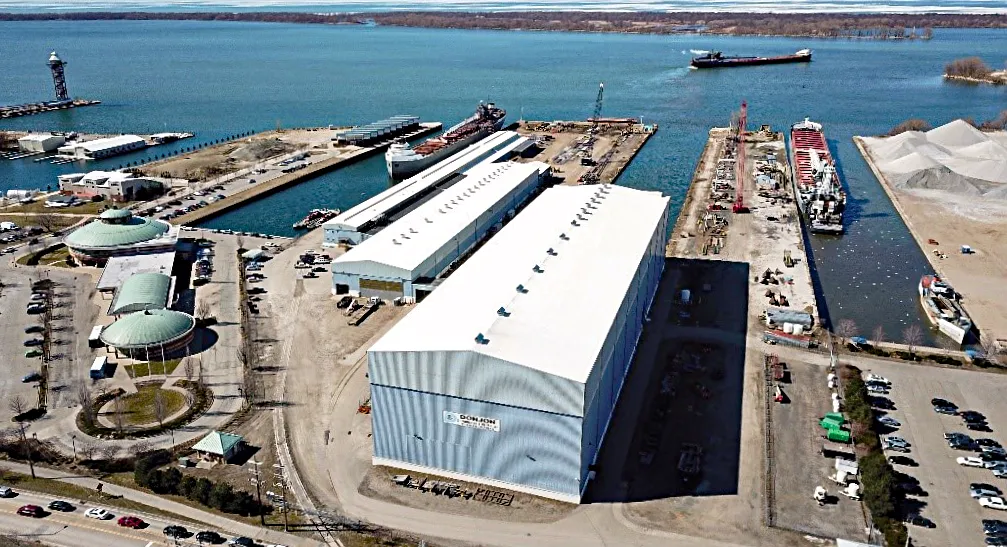
Donjon shipyard with fully enclosed assembly building in Erie, Pennsylvania.

Work in shipyards typically involves the construction, modification, retrofitting and repair of ships. This varies according to the type of shipyard and if there are drydocks in the shipyard. It may also involve ship breaking, although in the 21st century, most ship recycling takes place at the Alang Ship Breaking Yard in India, the Chittagong Ship Breaking Yard in Bangladesh and the Gadani Ship Breaking Yard in Pakistan. Shipyards normally have industrial facilities for the production, assembly, and installation of materials. Shipyards normally have quays, jetties and slipways that include specific areas for launching, for repair and for outfitting work. The work in the shipyard will typically involve activities such as the welding and cutting of steel, the use of cutting tools and other machine tools plumbing, electrical work, and the application, removal or renewal of paints and coatings.

Work in the shipyard typically falls under the relevant national domestic health and safety legislation. Examples around the world include the US Shipyard Industry Standards, part of Occupational Safety and Health Administration, the UK workplace regulations of the UK Health and Safety Executive and the Industrial Safety and Health Act of Ministry of Employment and Labor in South Korea. Work in shipyards can at times be considered dangerous. Accidents in shipyards may involve falls from height, as well as injuries from the use of tools and equipment, and from other hazards such as fire, explosion and pollution. In the late 20th century, many shipyard workers have been affected by the legacy of asbestos use within shipyards, although the use of the material is often prohibited following greater understanding of the effects of asbestosis. Hazards may also come from factors such as slips, trips, excessive-noise, high-pressure tools and impact tools such as needleguns and grinders. To mitigate the dangers and hazards of shipyard work, many employ safe systems of work based on regulation, best practice and guidance, typically involve the control of processes and the use of risk assessments and similar methods of work.

== Prominent dockyards and shipyards ==
=== Africa ===
- Alexandria shipyard, the oldest shipyard in Africa founded in 1831 located in Alexandria, Egypt.
- Tema Shipyard in Tema Ghana, is one of the largest shipyards in Africa.

=== North America ===
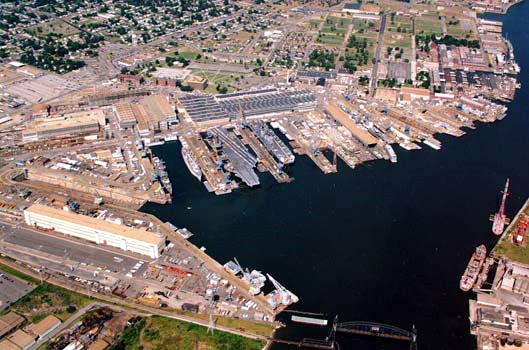
Aerial view of Norfolk Naval Shipyard.

- Davie Shipbuilding, (formerly Chantier Davie Canada Inc) in Lévis, Québec, is the oldest continually operating shipbuilder in North America.
- Newport News Shipbuilding, (formerly Northrop Grumman Newport News) is the largest private ship builder in the US and the one best known for its unique capacity to build the Nimitz-class aircraft carriers.
- Ingalls Shipbuilding, part of Huntington Ingalls Industries, located in Pascagoula, Mississippi, repaired the USS Cole and builds offshore drilling rigs, cruise ships and naval vessels.
- National Steel and Shipbuilding Company (NASSCO) shipyard in San Diego, California, part of General Dynamics; is the primary shipbuilding location on the west coast of the United States.
- Norfolk Naval Shipyard in Portsmouth, Virginia, is one of the largest shipyards in the world; specializing in repairing, overhauling and modernizing naval ships and submarines. It's the oldest and largest industrial facility that belongs to the United States Navy
- Electric Boat Division (EBDiv) of General Dynamics in Groton, Connecticut, with an accessory facility in Quonset Point, Rhode Island, builder of many Naval submarines over the past 100 years, with some types built only here.
- Bath Iron Works (BIW), subsidiary of General Dynamics, is a major American shipyard located on the Kennebec River in Bath, Maine.
- Puget Sound Naval Shipyard in Bremerton, Washington, is also owned by the U.S. Navy. It services ships and submarines from the West Coast.
- Vigor Marine Group, a shipbuilding and ship repair company headquartered in Portland, Oregon, with shipyards in Oregon, Washington, California, and Virginia as of 2025.
- Pearl Harbor Naval Shipyard and Intermediate Maintenance Facility is operated by the US Navy. It services surface ships and submarines from the Pacific region

=== South America ===
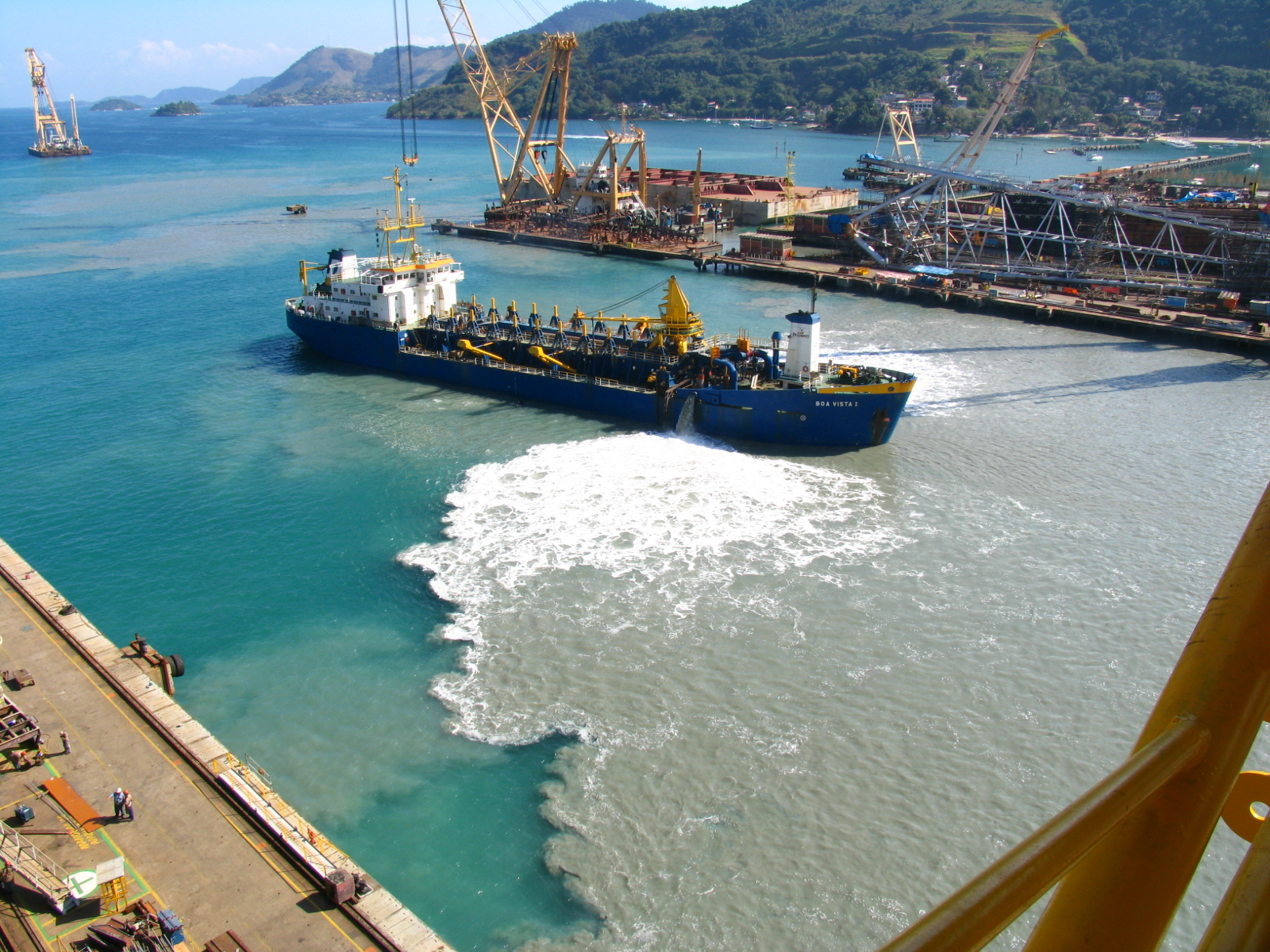
Brasfels Shipyard – Rio de Janeiro.

- COTECMAR shipyard in Cartagena de Indias, Colombia.
- The DIANCA shipyard in Puerto Cabello, Venezuela.
- The SIMA shipyard in Callao, Peru.
- ASMAR shipyards in Valparaíso, Talcahuano and Punta Arenas, Chile.

=== Europe ===
- Imperial Arsenal is in Istanbul, Turkey. Founded in 1454, it is still operated today under the name Haliç Shipyard.
- Riga Shipyard is in Riga, Latvia. Established in 1913 and revived after both world wars, it remains one of the largest shipyards in the Baltic region.
- Ferguson Shipbuilders is in Port Glasgow in inverclyde Scotland on the River Clyde. The Ferguson yard has been building ships for over a 110 years

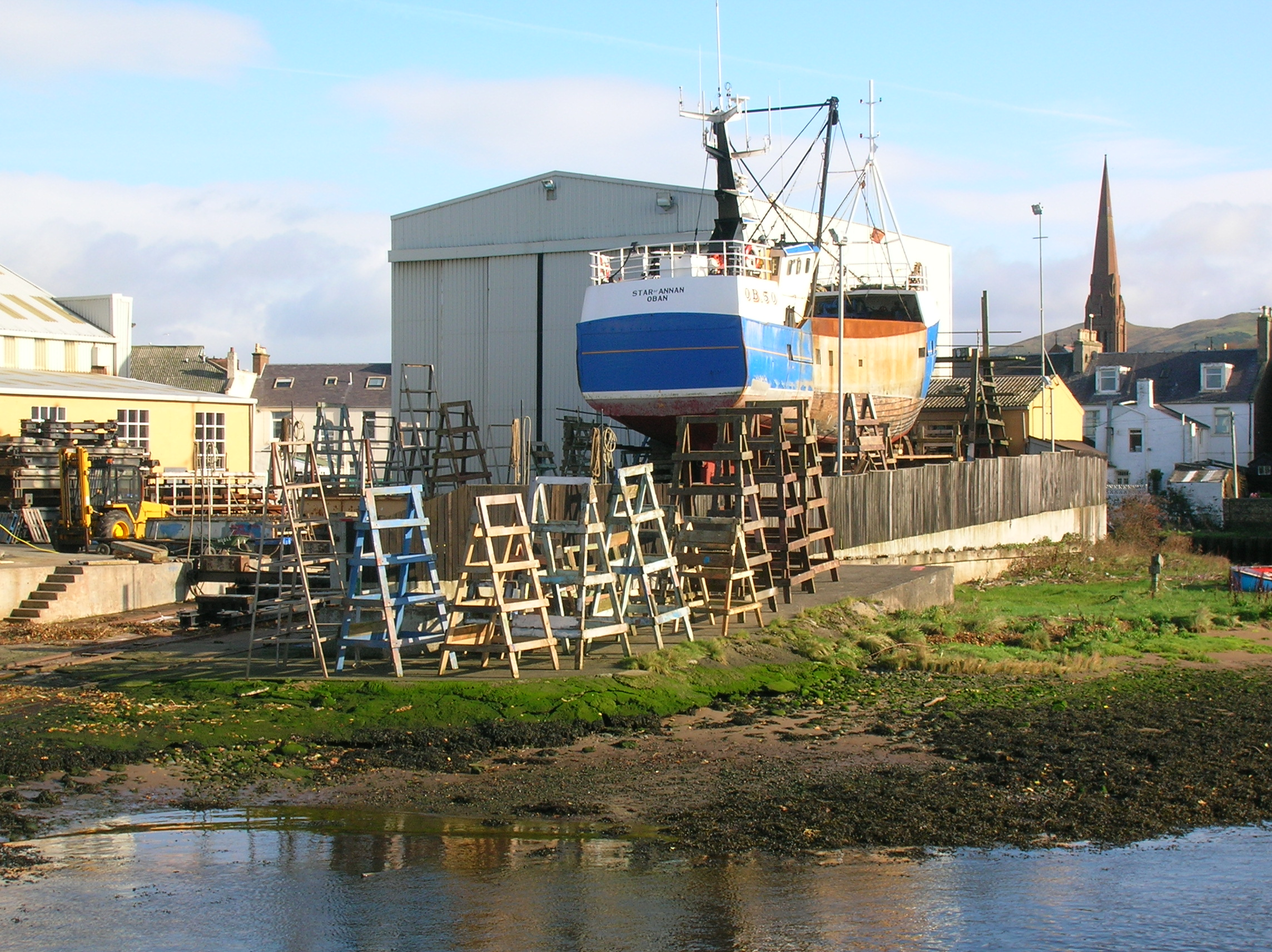
Girvan shipyard Alexander Noble and son, Ayrshire Scotland.

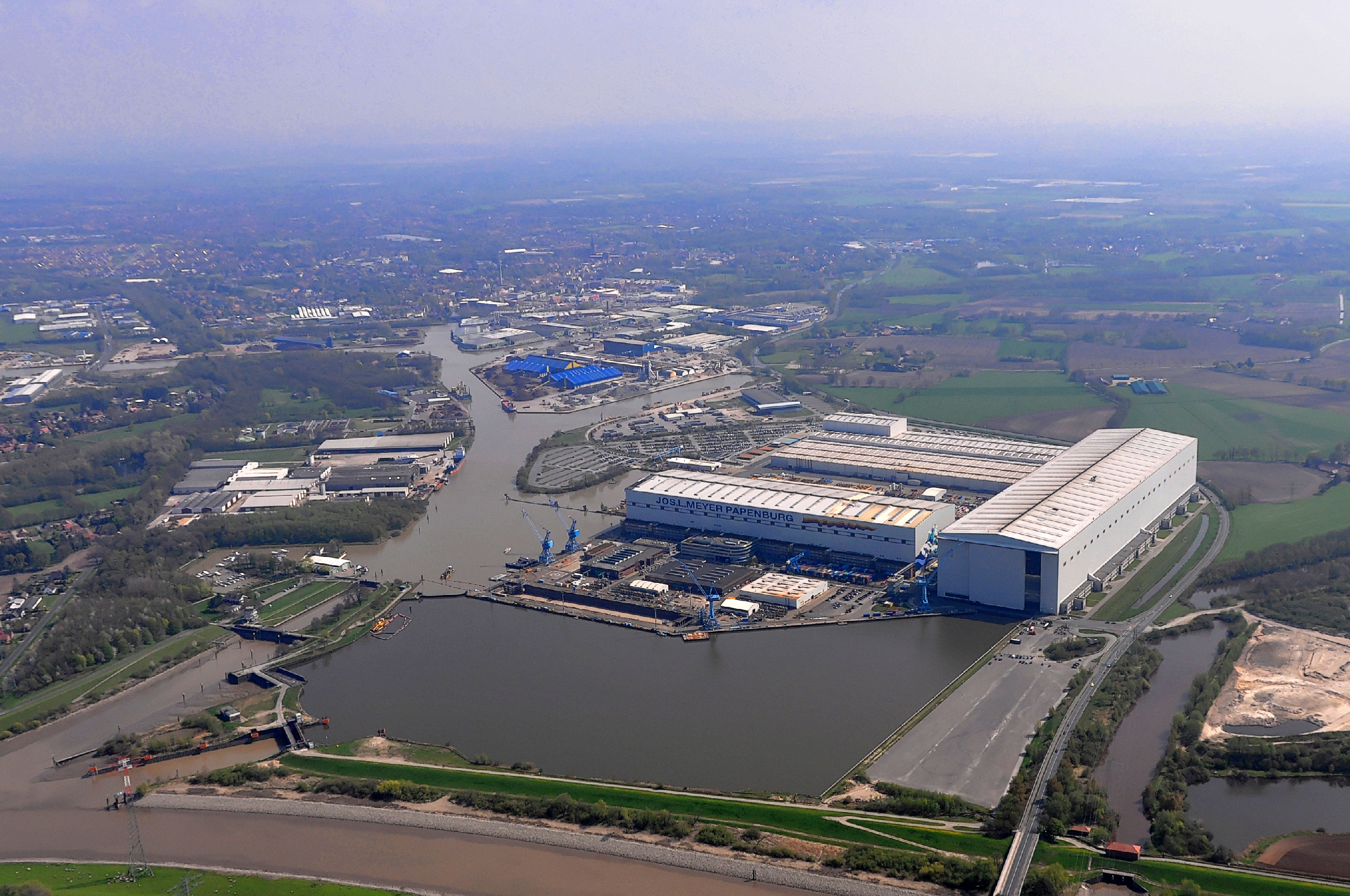
Meyer Werft shipyard in Papenburg, Germany.

- BAE Systems Maritime operates two surface shipbuilding yards in the United Kingdom at Scotstoun and Govan, both on the River Clyde in Glasgow, Scotland. Major projects include the Type 45 destroyer and the Queen Elizabeth-class aircraft carriers.
- BAE Systems Submarine operates a major shipyard at Barrow-in-Furness in Cumbria, England. It is the largest remaining shipyard in the UK, and is capable of building nuclear submarines such as the Royal Navy's Vanguard class. Preceding companies such as Vickers Shipbuilding and Engineering have constructed hundreds of surface ships and civilian vessels in Barrow since the late 19th century.
- Fincantieri – Cantieri Navali Italiani S.p.A. is an Italian shipbuilding company based in Trieste, Italy. It was formed in 1959 and is the largest shipbuilder in Europe, and one of the largest in the world. The company has built both commercial and military vessels during its history.
- Lürssen (or Lürssen Werft) is a German shipbuilding company based in Bremen-Vegesack. Lürssen designs and constructs yachts, naval ships and special vessels. Trading as Lürssen Yachts, it is one of the leading builders of custom superyachts.
- Chantiers de l'Atlantique in Saint-Nazaire
- Fayard – also known as Lindøværftet.
- Helsinki Shipyard
- Meyer Turku
- Rauma Marine Constructions

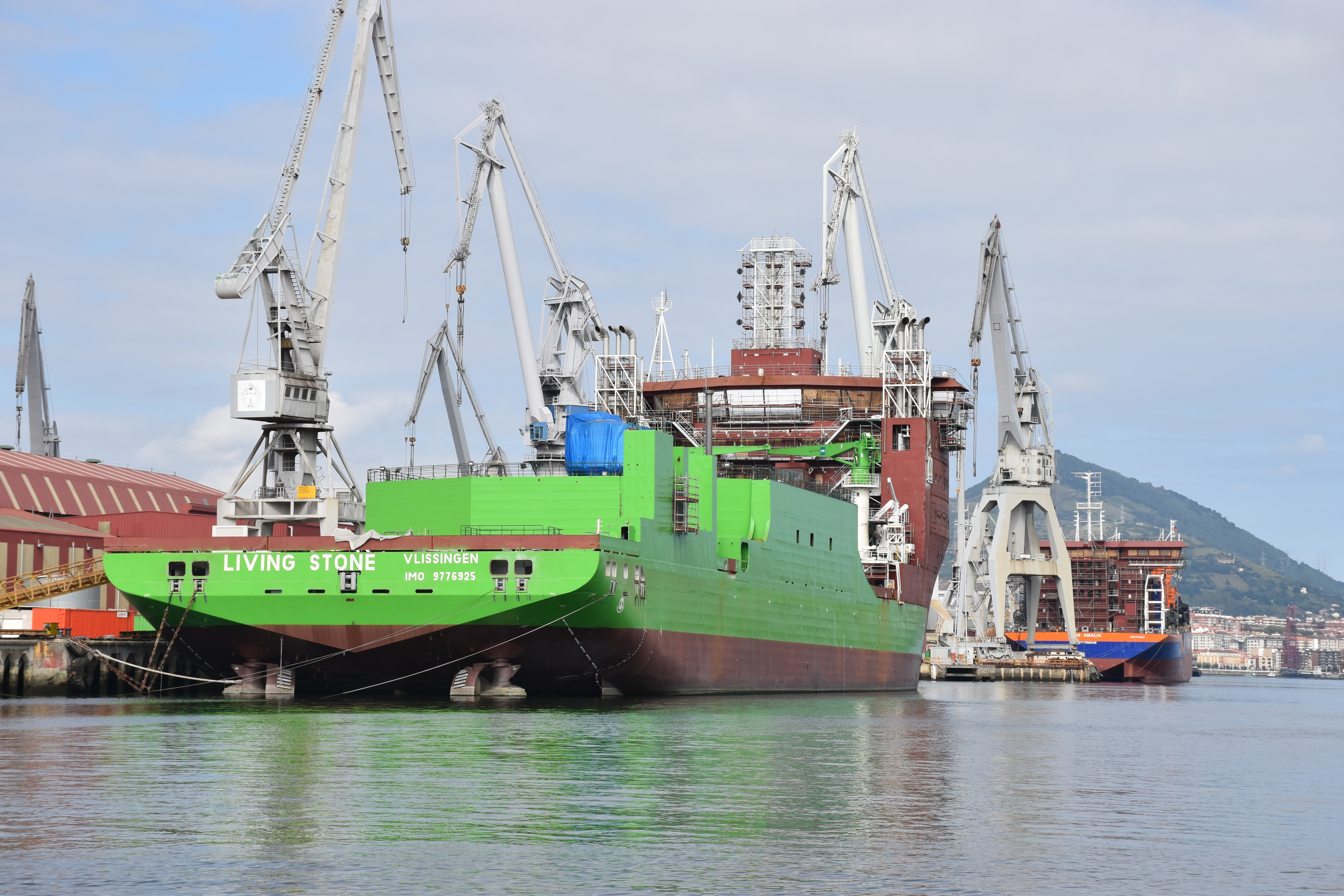
LaNaval shipyard in Bilbao, Spain

- The Meyer Werft GmbH is one of the major German shipyards, headquartered in Papenburg at the river Ems. Founded in 1795 and starting with small wooden vessels, today Meyer Werft is one of world's leading builders of luxury passenger ships. Altogether about 700 ships of different types have been built at the yard.
- Navantia: major public Spanish shipbuilding firm, which offers its services to both military and civil sector in three industrial areas: Cartagena / Cádiz / Ferrol (headquarters: Madrid) and with recent important projects as F100-class frigate program and S-80-class submarine program
- Construcciones Navales del Norte LaNaval, Sestao (Bilbao)
- Lisnave: repair facilities in Setúbal (Lisbon, Portugal)
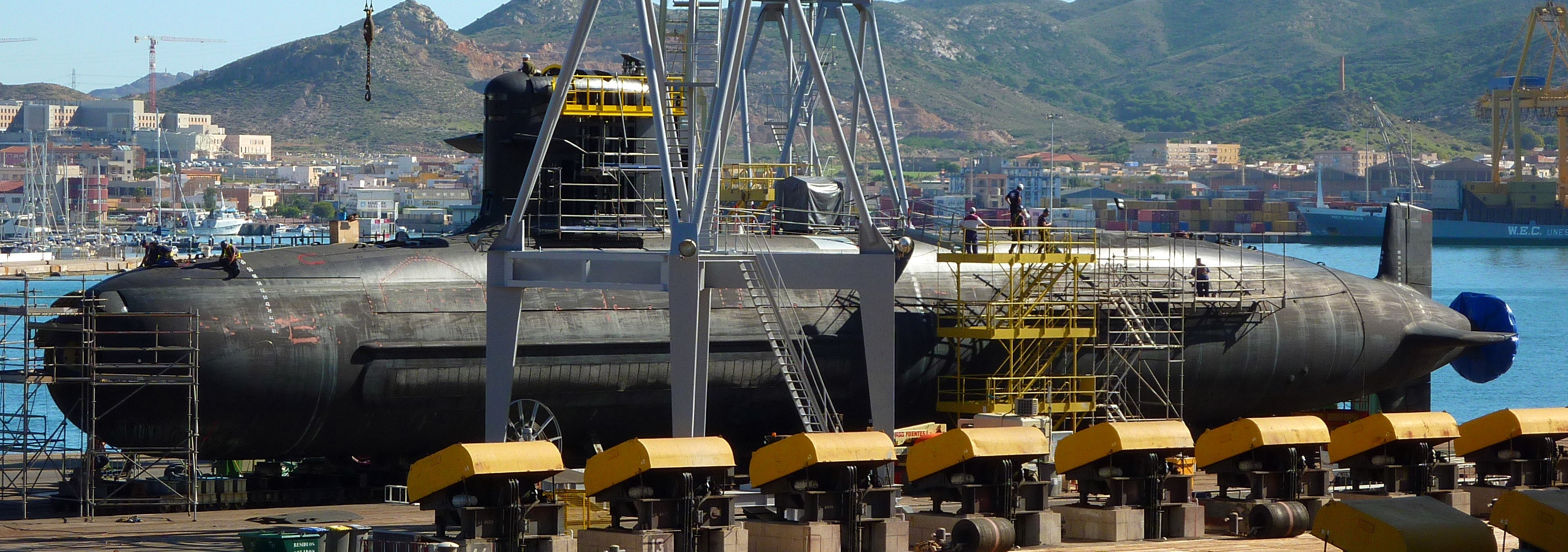
- Navantia-Cartagena shipyard (Spain)
  Devonport Dockyard, located in the city of Plymouth, England in the county of Devon is the largest naval base in Western Europe. It has 15 dry docks, four miles (6.4 km) of waterfront, 25 tidal berths, five basins and covers 650 acres (2.6 km^{2}). It is the main refitting base for Royal Navy nuclear submarines and also handles work on frigates. It is the base for seven of the Trafalgar-class nuclear-powered hunter-killer submarines and many frigates, exploiting its convenient access to the Atlantic Ocean. It supports the Vanguard-class Trident missile nuclear ballistic missile submarines in a custom-built refitting dock. It houses HMS Courageous, a nuclear-powered submarine used in the Falklands War and open to the general public. Facilities in the local area also include a major naval training establishment and a base for the Royal Marines.
- Chatham Dockyard, located on the River Medway in Kent, was established as a royal dockyard by Queen Elizabeth I in 1567. For 414 years, the Dockyard provided over 500 ships for the Royal Navy, and was forefront of shipbuilding, industrial and architectural technology. At its height, it employed over 10,000 skilled artisans and covered 400 acres (1.6 km^{2}). The dockyard closed in 1984, and most of the Georgian dockyard is now managed as a visitor attraction by the Chatham Historic Dockyard Trust.
- Damen Shiprepair in Brest, France. It operates three drydocks, up to 420 by 80 metres (1,380 by 260 ft).
- Sunderland, County Durham a town once hailed as the "Largest Shipbuilding Town in the World". ships were built at the Sunderland Docks from at least 1346 and by the mid-18th century Sunderland was one of the chief shipbuilding towns in the country.
- Constanța Shipyard in Romania on the shores of the Black Sea Basin.
- Mangalia Shipyard again in Romania, 45 km (28 mi) south of the port of Constanța.
- Galați shipyard Galați is the largest naval shipyard on the Danube, given its strategic positioning inland but with access to the sea through either Sulina or Danube-Black Sea canal its output ranges from large tankers to research vessels, yachts and small coast guard patrol boats. The yard is known for taking on specialty projects and under Damen has completed over such 250 vessels since 1999.
- The Black Sea Shipyard in Mykolaiv, Ukraine, is one of the largest shipyards in Europe, and is where all Soviet and Russian aircraft carriers were built.

=== East Asia ===
- Kawasaki Shipbuilding Corporation's Kobe Shipyard & Machinery Works in Japan builds oil tankers, LNG carriers, bulk carriers, container ships, Ro/Ro vessels, jetfoils and warships for the Japan Maritime Self-Defense Force
- Mitsui E&S's Tamano Works builds bulk carriers, ore carriers, crude oil tankers, oil product carriers, LNG carriers, LPG carriers, reefers, container ships, pure car carriers, cargo ships, patrol vessels, ocean surveillance ships, training vessels, fishery patrol boats and fishing boats
- Mitsubishi Heavy Industries's Nagasaki Shipyard & Machinery Works primarily produces specialized commercial vessels, including LNG carriers, oil tankers and passenger cruise ships
- Hyundai Heavy Industries Ulsan Shipyard & Gunsan shipyard, in South Korea, is currently the largest in the world and has the capability to build a variety of vessels including Commercial Cargo, FPSO offshore, container ship, LNG Carrier, Car carriers, Tankers like VLCC & ULCC, Iron ore carrier and Naval vessels like Aegis destroyers & submarines.
- Hyundai Samho Heavy Industries Samho shipyard near Mokpo 4th largest South Korean shipyard for VLCC Oil tankers, container ships & LNG, Offshore, Subsidiary of Hyundai heavy industries.
- CSBC Corporation, Taiwan, in Taiwan, is a private company that produces ships for civilian and military use. It was a state-owned enterprise of Taiwan (Republic of China) but transitioned to private ownership via an IPO in 2008. It is headquartered in Kaohsiung and shipyards in Kaohsiung and Keelung.
- Yantai Raffles Shipyard, in Yantai, China, is that country's largest offshore builder. It employs the 20,000 ton crane Taisun, the holder of the Heavy Lift World Record. Yantai Raffles' portfolio includes offshore platforms, pipe lay and other specialized vessels.
- Jiangnan Shipyard, in Shanghai, China, is a subsidiary of China State Shipbuilding Corporation that produces both military and civilian ships. Its headquarters and main shipyard are based in Shanghai, with subsidiary shipyards in Shanghai and Chongqing.
- Bohai Shipyard, in Huludao, China, is a subsidiary of China Shipbuilding Industry Corporation that produces military (including nuclear powered vessels) and civilian ships.

=== South East Asia ===
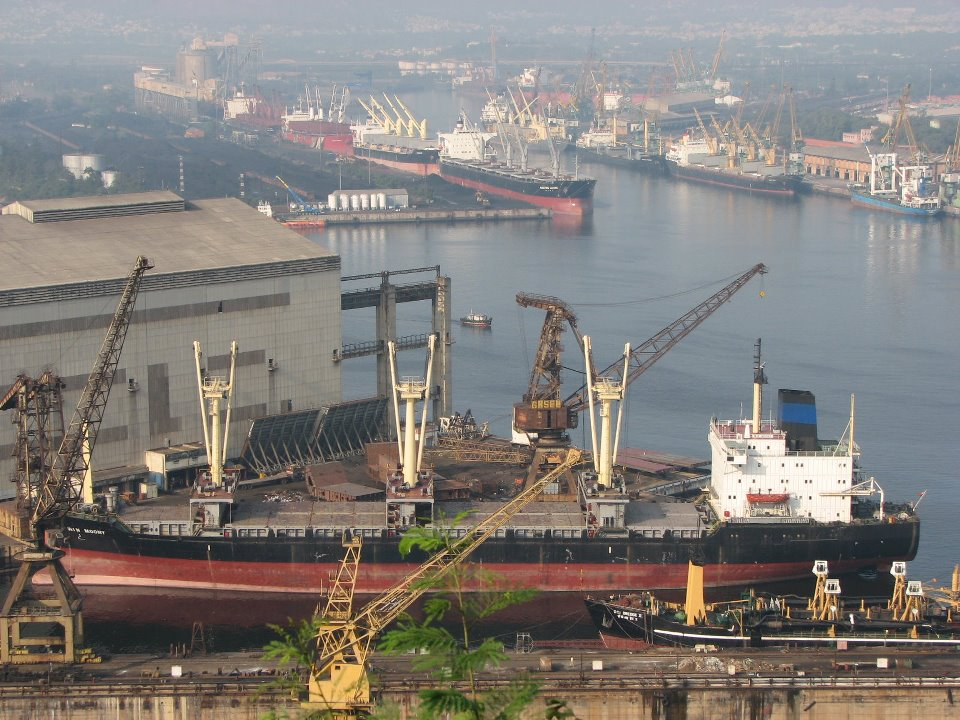
Visakhapatnam Shipyard

- Keppel Shipyard (Singapore)
- Palindo Marine in Batam, Indonesia
- Hanjin shipyard in Subic, Zambales, Philippines
- The Bangkok Dock Company Sattahip, Thailand
- Bason Shipyard, in Ho Chi Minh City, Vietnam, is a long-standing builder that was established by the French government in April 1863 to repair warships and merchant vessels. Aside from its main function of building and repairing naval vessels, Bason also offers service to local and foreign customers from Southeast Asia and Europe.

=== South Asia and the Middle East ===
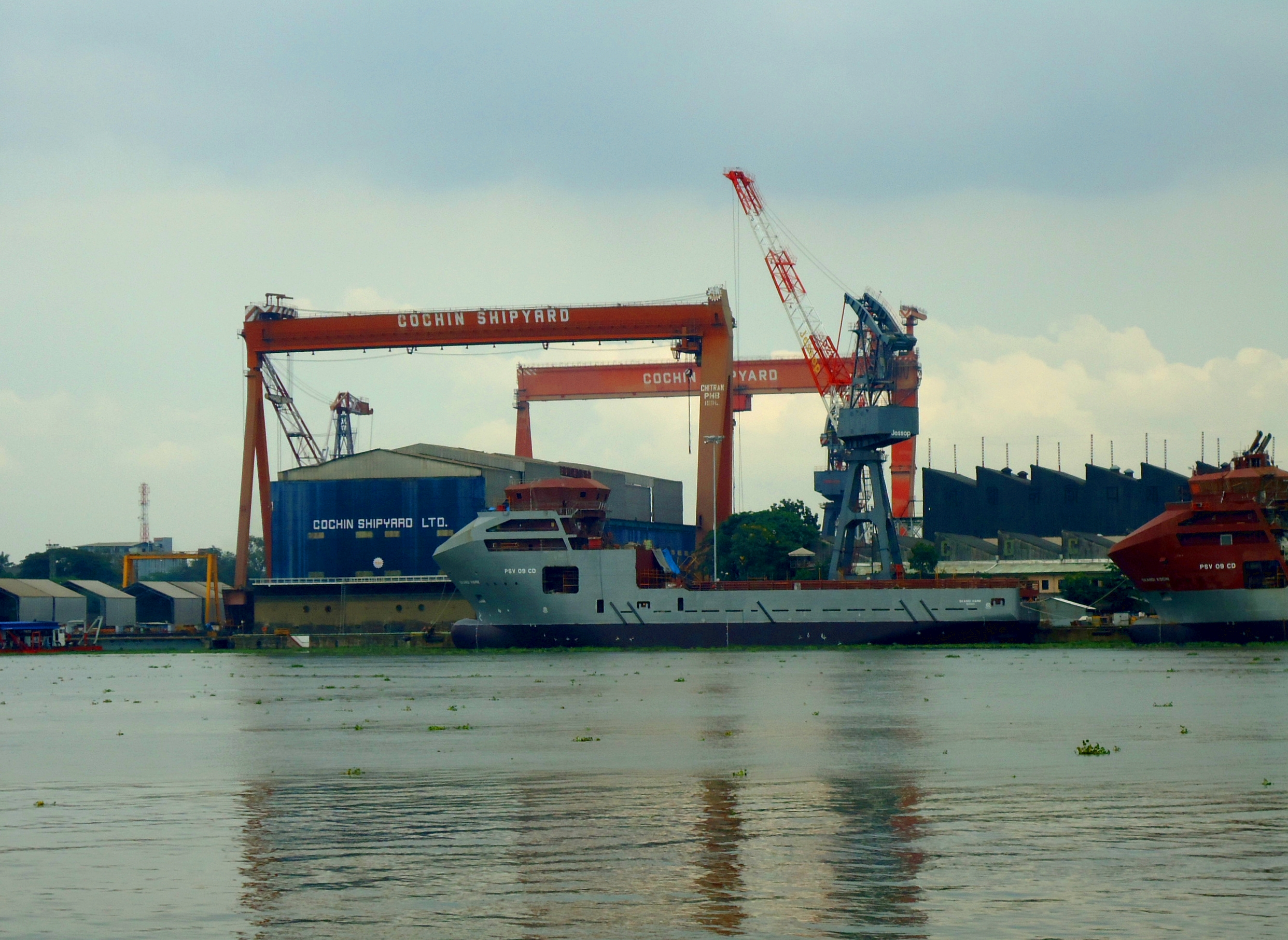
Cranes in Cochin Shipyard (India).

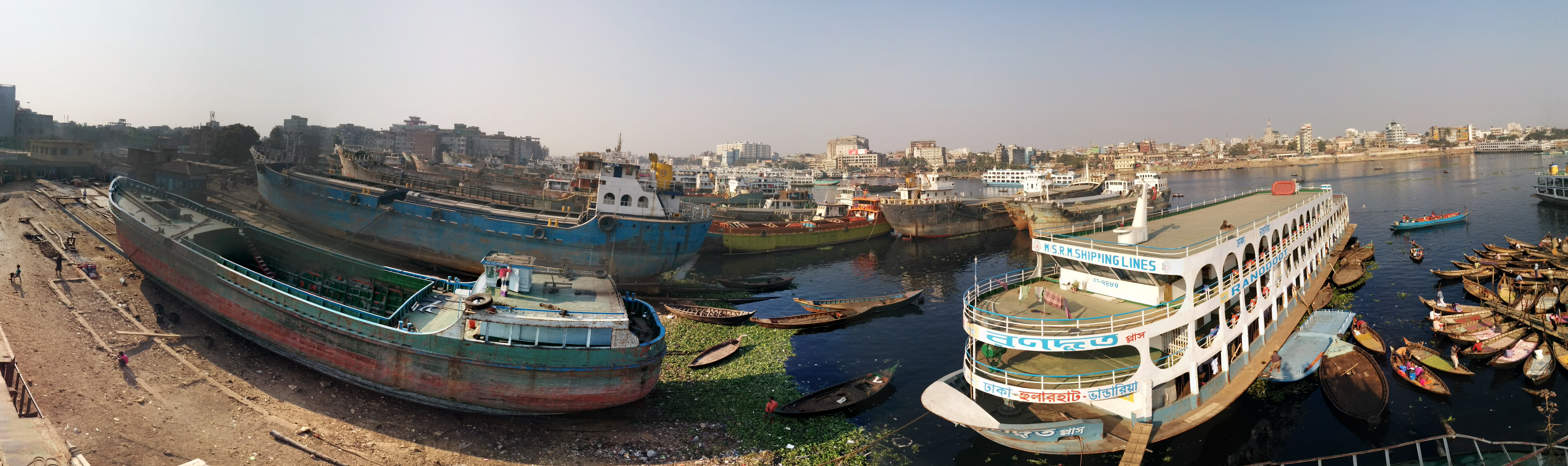
Dhaka Shipyard

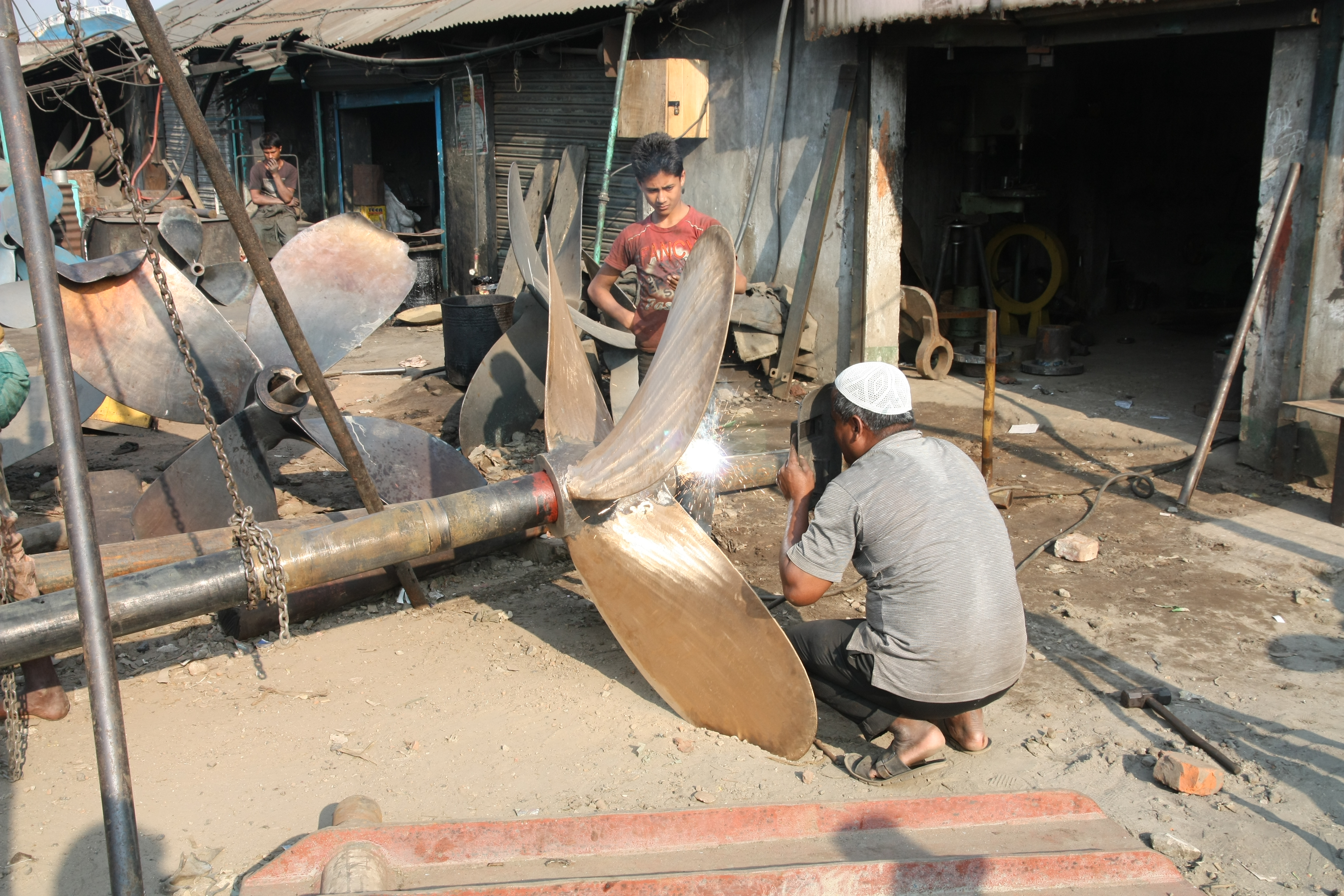
Dhaka Shipyard – welding propellers

- Radiant Shipyard Limited, a shipyard in Bangladesh, built the country's first LPG carrier.
- The beach at Alang in the Indian state of Gujarat is the site of a large complex of shipbreaking yards. In 2010, the yard dismantled 357 ships; on average the yard processes 28–30 ships a month.
- The Jebel Ali and Dubai ports in the UAE are capable of handling, constructing and repairing large ships. They also provide dry dock facilities.
- The gate 7 of Shuwaikh port in the Kuwait has facility for repairing ships. They also provide dry dock facilities.
- FMC Dockyard is a shipyards in Bangladesh, located in Eastern Bank of the Karnaphuli river in Chittagong.
- Western Marine Shipyard, a shipyard in Bangladesh based in Chittagong.
- Khulna Shipyard is a shipyard in Bangladesh, situated in Khulna. It mainly produces warships for Bangladesh Navy.
- Ananda Shipyard and Shipways, a shipyard in Bangladesh, located in Narayanganj.
- Pipavav Shipyard in Gujarat, India, is the leading, modern and largest engineering facility in the business of ships and offshore platforms construction, repair and conversion, heavy engineering and offshore engineering in South Asia.
- Colombo Dockyard in Colombo, Sri Lanka, is the largest engineering facility in the business of ship repair, shipbuilding, heavy engineering and offshore engineering in Sri Lanka.
- Cochin Shipyard in Kochi, India, is the country's largest shipyard. It is building the Vikrant-class aircraft carrier.
- Garden Reach Shipbuilders and Engineers is located in India. It is owned by the Government of India and is constructing the Shardul-class tank landing ships for the Indian Navy.
- Hindustan Shipyard is a shipyard located in Visakhapatnam on the east coast of India.
- Hooghly Cochin Shipyard, formerly known as Hooghly Dock & Port Engineers Limited is a shipyard at Howrah, India.
- Karachi Shipyard and Naval Dockyard in Karachi, Pakistan, is that country's first and oldest yard. It constructs cargo ships, tugboats, support vessels, and warships.
- Mazagaon Dockyard, operated by state-owned Mazagaon Dock Limited, is one of India's largest shipyards. It constructs a variety of ships both for the defence and civilian sector. The dockyard is known for constructing Britain's HMS Trincomalee. Currently the shipyard is building three Shivalik-class frigates and three Kolkata-class destroyers for the Indian Navy.
- Shalimar Works is a public sector shipbuilding company of West Bengal, India.

== See also ==
- List of shipbuilders and shipyards
- Shipbuilding
- Shipyard transporter
