= Western Marine Shipyard =

Bangladeshi shipbuilding company

Western Marine Shipyard Limited
- Type: Public Limited Company
- Traded as: DSE: WMSHIPYARD; CSE: WMSHIPYARD
- Industry: Shipbuilding
- Founded: July 11, 2000
- Headquarters: 1440/A Strand Road, Chattogram-4100, Bangladesh., Chattogram, Bangladesh
- Area served: Worldwide
- Key people: Md. Saiful Islam (Chairman); Capt. Sohail Hasan (Managing Director)
- Products: Multipurpose Cargo Ships; Cargo Vessels; Tugboats; Tankers; Ferries; Port Utility Vessels; Passenger Ships; Fishing Trawlers; and many more
- Services: Shipbuilding and repair.
- Revenue: ▲$ 40 million (2018) ▼$ 27 million (2019)
- Operating income: ▲$ 11 million (2019)
- Net income: ▲$ 10 million (2019)
- Total assets: ▲$ 264 million (2019)
- Number of employees: 3500
- Website: wms.com.bd

Western Marine Shipyard Limited is a publicly listed shipbuilding company standing with over 42 acres of land beside the Karnaphuli River in Chattogram, Bangladesh. The shipyard has constructed various types of vessels, including ocean-going multi-purpose cargo vessels, passenger vessels & boats, oil tankers, ro-ro ferries, pontoons, barges, fishing trawlers, dredgers, tug boats, container vessels, etc. It owns an 89 percent share of Bangladesh's shipbuilding market. The company is listed on Dhaka and Chittagong Stock Exchange.

== History ==
The parent company, Western Marine Services, was formed by a group of marine professionals specialized in ship repairs and the export of marine supplies.

Gradually the company grew. In the year 2000 they had over 1.5 acres of land for building inland vessels, and more than five hundred employees. The yard also has signed a MoU with the Chittagong Dry Dock in order to aid the CDD with developing heavy steel engineering capabilities and provide them necessary technical support.

Western Marine is constructing 20 class certified cargo vessels for local company Evergreen Shipping Line.

In 2019, Captain Sohail Hasan took over as Managing Director (MD) of the company.

== Shipyard facilities ==
The shipyard utilizes workshops, logistical resources, and equipment to build ships. The yard stands over 42 acres of land and employs a workforce of over 3500 altogether.

The following are some of the shipyard's facilities:

- Bonded warehouse
- Blasting shop
- Computer Numerical Control(CNC) shop
- Mechanical and Carpentry shop
- Fabrication yard and shed
- Gantry crane
- Healthcare facilities

== Health and safety ==
In conjunction with the Deutsche Gesellschaft für Internationale Zusammenarbeit (GIZ) Western Marine set itself to analyze the risks and hazards their workers faced. Through this, strict reporting procedures were established, and training was provided for managers and workers; including annual firefighting training. Western Marine has seen a 99% reduction in accidents for the addition of new services and procedures.

The shipyard contains a PHCC (Primary Health Care Center), which was created in coordination with the GIZ and the Bangladesh Ministry of Health and Family Welfare. In this free-of-charge facility, shipyard workers are given tests for their hearing, lungs, and total physical checkups. This facility was available for use, and workers received aid and treatment. The government Health Ministry provided a nurse in addition to the doctor and paramedics that are provided by the shipyard. This facility is also accessible to the local community, where more than 30,000 people, including many of the workers and their families, live.

== Awards and certifications ==
Western Marine Shipyard has received a few awards, including the National Maritime Award in 2007, the National Export Trophy in Gold category for the contribution of the fiscal year of 2011, the President's Award for Industrial Development in the Hi-Tech industries category at 2016 and the 8th HSBC Export Excellence Awards at 2018.

== Projects ==
Western Marine Shipyard exported 31 ships to various countries of the world (Finland, Germany, Pakistan, Denmark, Tanzania, Uganda, Ecuador, New Zealand, Gambia, Kenya, India, UAE, etc.) and brought around US$151 Million of remittance. The yard has built more than 60 ships which includes ocean going multi purpose cargo vessels, passenger vessels & boats, oil tankers, ro-ro ferries, pontoons, barges, fishing trawlers, dredgers, tug boats, container vessels, and more, with further plans to export more than $250 million worth of ships. Western Marine operates in conjunction with classification societies through the entire building and testing process of new vessels. The yard has worked with Bureau Veritas, DNV-GL, Nippon Kaiji Kyokai (ClassNK), and Lloyd's Register to insure class built ships for their buyers.

A few of Western Marine's completed vessels.

=== Bay Cleaner - 2 ===
Built for Chittagong Port Authority, Bangladesh:

- Type: Oily Waste Collection Vessel
- Length OA: 25.00m
- Breadth moulded: 6.80m
- Depth: 4.10m
- Capacity: Waste oil storage- 150 cbm
- Fresh water- 30cbm+
- Fuel oil- 40 cbm+
- Lube oil- 3cbm+
- 12 knots Speed
- Class: Germanischer Lloyd
- Class Notation: 100A5 RSA (50), + MC
- Design: Foreship Ltd., Helsinki, Finland
- Propulsion engine: 2 X 500 HP (Volvo Penta, Sweden)

=== FT Agro Food Fleet of 3 ===
Built for Sea Resources Ltd.:

- Type: Fishing trawler
- Year built: Aug 2013
- Length X Breadth X Depth: 42.00m X 11.00m X 4.70m
- Fish holding capacity: 300 tons
- Pulling Capacity: 26 tons
- 10 knots speed
- Design: Western Marine Shipyard Ltd., Bangladesh
- Engine Power: 1850 BHP
- Generator: 800 KW

=== Grona Shipping Ice Class Fleet of 8 ===
Built for Grona Shipping GmbH, Germany:

- Type: Multipurpose cargo
- Year built: March 2011
- Dimension: 99.99m X 13.50m X 9.10m
- Ice Class: E3
- Cargo capacity: 5200 DWT
- Light Weight Tonnage: 1500MT
- Speed: 12 knots
- Class: Germanischer Lloyd
- Design: Peters Finance BV, Netherlands
- Propulsion engine: MAK 6M25C

=== MV Mataliki ===
Built for Ministry of Foreign Affairs & Trade, New Zealand:

- Type: SOLAS Passenger ship
- Length OA: 44.32m (appx)
- Length BP: 38.56m (appx)
- Breadth MLD: 9.90m (appx)
- Design draft: 2.60m
- Depth to weather deck: 4.10m
- Depth to deck & atside deck: 6.60m
- Water ballast: 90m3
- Grey water: 3m3 (min)
- Fresh water: 40m3
- 10 feet container: 5 NTS
- Break bulk cargo area: 40m2
- Service speed on design draft: 11.50 knots (85% MCR)
- Engine power: 2 X 480 kW
- Shaft generator: 2 X 150 kW
- Aux Engine: 1 X 110 kW
- Emergency genset: 1 X 80 kW
- Cargo crane: 3.6 tons @ 12m outreach
- Passengers (international service): 60
- Crew: 10 + Senior Officers: 2
- Class: Lloyd's Register

=== ISEFJORD ===
Built for Hundested-Rorvig Faergefart A/S, Denmark:

- Type: Ro-ro ferry
- Class: Bureau Veritas
- Designer: Jorgen Petersen Ltd & Norman Marine, Denmark
- Length OA: 51.00m
- Length BP: 50.49m
- Breadth moulded: 11.60m
- Depth moulded: 3.40m
- Gross tonnage: 475
- Draught: 2.25m
- Deadweight: 165 tons
- Lightweight: 469.65 tons
- Service Speed: 11 knots @ 85% mcr
- Max speed: 14 knots
- Output: 375 kW each
- 1800rpm
- Crew: 2
- Passenger: 147
- Cabins: 1 X Enclosed Passenger Lounge, 1 X Open Passenger Area, 2 X cabins for crew
- Number of vehicle decks: One
- Total lane length: 48m
- Number: 24 cars & 2 trucks
- Unmanned Engine room
- Operable with one crew

=== Isla Bartolomé ===
Built for Transnave, an Ecuadorian Navy Company:

- Type: Multipurpose cargo
- Year built: 2012
- LOA X B(mid) X D :88.04MX 15.00M X 7.50m
- Draught: 6.00m
- Ice Class: E3
- Cargo Capacity: 3,831 DWT
- Cargo Hold: 5187CBM
- Cargo Crane: 2 x 60 Tons
- Engine: Wartsilla 9I26a2 (2999 kW @1000 RPM)
- Speed: 13.5 knots
- Designer: Hunte Engineering, Germany
- Class: Germanischer Lloyd

The ship was inaugurated by President Rafael Correa while it was added to the Ecuadorian Navy Fleet on 9 September 2015.

=== OPV Doria ===
Built for JGH Marine A/S, Denmark; operated by Ministry of Agriculture, Livestock & Fisheries, Kenya:

- Type: Offshore patrol vessel (OPV)
- Length OA: 54.7
- Length BP: 50.90m
- Depth: 4.50m
- Displacement: 350 tons
- Draft molded: 2.20m
- Lightweight: 500 tons
- Service speed: 22 knots
- Max speed: 35 knots
- Range: 1500 nautical miles
- Daily fuel consumption: 3.6 tons/day (Incl. electrical load)
- Class: Bureau Veritas
- Two engines: one for Controllable Pitch propeller & one for Waterjet propulsion
- Output: 2X4000kW for CPP & 2720 kW for Waterjet
- Helipad with bridge control
- Hybrid propulsion unit (CPP+Waterjet)
- Gearbox: ZF, Germany
- Propulsion Maker: Servogear AS, Norway
- Waterjet: MJP, Sweden

This vessel also received the 'Best Large Patrol Boat Builder' award in 2017 by Baird Maritime, a maritime publication platform that records deliveries of high-end patrol boats throughout the globe.

=== Jindal Steel Works (JSW) Fleet of 4 ===
Built for Jindal Steel Works (JSW), India:

- Type: Bulk carrier
- Length OA: 122.25 m Length BP: 117.10 m Breadth MLD: 20.00 m Depth MLD: 07.20m
- Deadweight: 8,000 DWT
- Gross Tonnage: 6000 T
- Trial speed (loaded): 10 knots
- Fuel consumption: approx.196 gm/kwhr
- Engine Power:1330 kW @ 900 RPM, Yanmar, Japan
- Class: Indian Register of Shipping (IRS)

=== Western Cruise ===
Built for Chittagong Boat Club, Bangladesh:

- Type: Passenger ship
- Length X Breadth X Depth: 30.00m X 7.80m X 7.00m
- Draught: 1.65m
- Capacity: 215 passengers
- Engine: 2X400HP @ 1800 RPM
- Speed: 12 knots
- Class: Germanischer Lloyd
- Build Year: 2012

=== Nurjahan Group Fleet of 4 ===
Built for Nurjahan group, Bangladesh:

- Type: Oil Tanker
- Year: Aug 2012
- Length X Breadth X Depth: 63.80m X 10.10m X 5.70m
- Capacity: 1350DWT
- Speed: 10 knots
- Class: Germanischer Lloyd
- Design: Western Marine Shipyard Ltd., Bangladesh
- Engine Power: 2 X 7250 BHP

=== MV DAR ES SALAAM ===
Built for JGH Marine; operated by the Tanzanian Transport Ministry:

- Type: Catamaran passenger ship
- Length 37.50m
- Breadth: 11.50m
- Depth: 3.80m
- Draught: 1.70m
- Passenger capacity: 302
- Speed: 22 knots
- Engine Power: 2X1140KW @ 1840 RPM

== Financial Issues ==
In 2017, the Finance Minister of Bangladesh, Abul Maal Abdul Muhith, identified WMS as one of the top twenty loan defaulters in the country. However, the shipyard has rescheduled its defaulted loans with two banks and has started to repay instalments regularly.

In 2021, Bank Asia initiated legal proceedings against Western Marine Shipyard Limited in an effort to recoup a classified loan totalling Tk505.90 crore.

== See also ==
- Shipbuilding in Bangladesh
- Radiant Shipyard Limited
