= Rocky Neck =

Rocky Neck may refer to:

- Rocky Neck, Gloucester, Massachusetts, art colony, peninsula and park
- Rocky Neck State Park, Connecticut
