= Shipbuilding in Bangladesh =

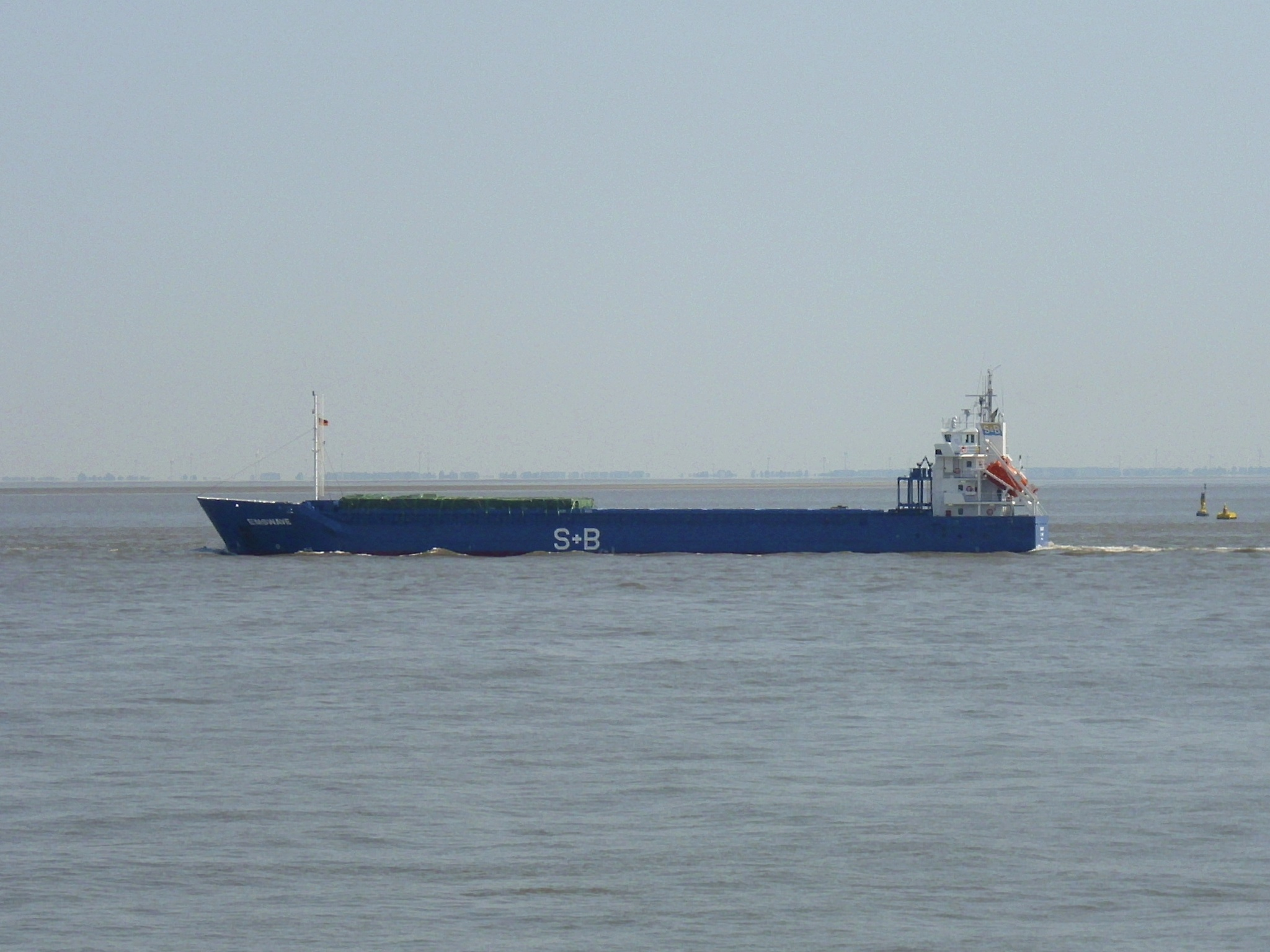
The Emswave is a ship built in Bangladesh

Bangladesh has a long history of shipbuilding. It has over 200 shipbuilding companies. Some of the leading shipbuilding companies of Bangladesh include Radiant Shipyard Limited, Ananda Shipyard & Slipways Limited, FMC Dockyard Limited, Western Marine Shipyard, Chittagong Dry Dock Limited, Khulna Shipyard and Dockyard and Engineering Works.

== History ==
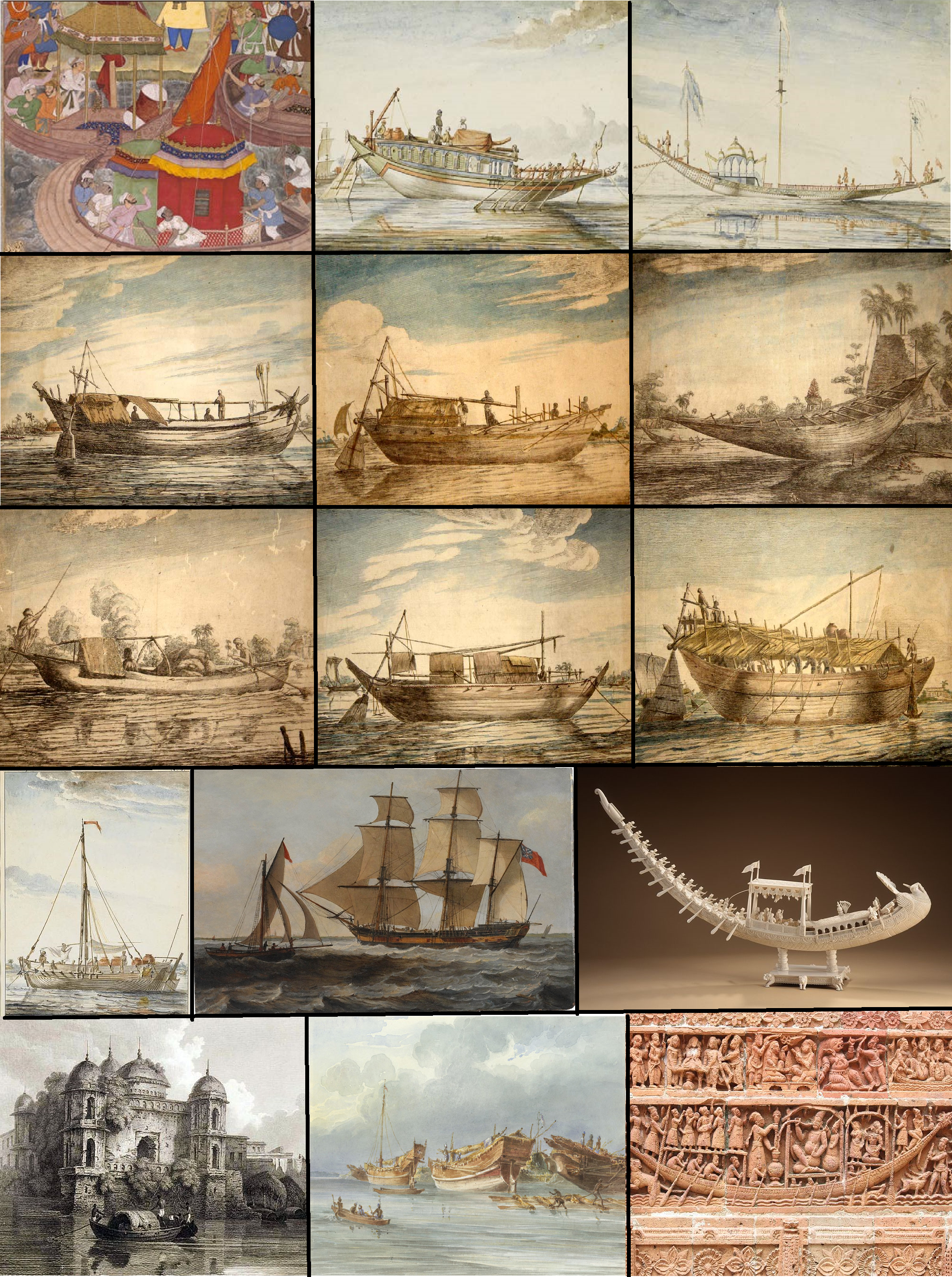
Different types of boats and ships used in Bengal

Due to the riverine geography of Bangladesh, ships have been playing a major role in the trade affairs of the people of this country since ancient times. According to the accounts of the 14th century Moroccan traveler Ibn Batuta, there used to be large fleets of warships docked in various ports of the country. A medieval European traveler Caesar Frederick documented that the port city of Chittagong and Sandwip were manufacturing hubs of large ships during the mid 15th century. The volume of shipbuilding swelled extensively during the Mughal period. During the 17th century, the shipyards of Chittagong and Sandwip used to build warships for the Sultan of Turkey.

=== Mughal era ===
During the Mughal Empire, the province of Bengal Subah had a large shipbuilding industry. Economic historian Indrajit Ray estimates that shipbuilding output of Bengal during the sixteenth and seventeenth centuries at 223,250 tons annually, compared with 23,061 tons produced in nineteen colonies in North America from 1769 to 1771. He also assessed that ship repairing as very advanced in Bengal.

Bengali shipbuilding was advanced compared to European shipbuilding at the time. An important innovation in shipbuilding was the introduction of a flushed deck design in Bengal rice ships, resulting in hulls that were stronger and less prone to leak than the structurally weak hulls of traditional European ships built with a stepped deck design. The British East India Company later duplicated the flushed deck and hull designs of Bengal rice ships in the 1760s, leading to significant improvements in seaworthiness and navigation for European ships during the Industrial Revolution.

=== Modern era ===
Dockyard and Engineering Works Limited, the first modern shipyard of Bangladesh, was established in 1922, constructed during the British era in the subcontinent. After the liberation war in 1971, the dockyard was nationalized under the ministry of industries. Later it came under the control of Bangladesh Navy in 2006.

Radiant Shipyard Limited, established in 2012, constructed the first LPG carrier built in Bangladesh in 2014.

In 1979, the sector received its first foreign investment after the independence of Bangladesh when Mitsui Engineering and Shipbuilding Industry, a Japanese enterprise, formed a joint venture with High Speed Shipyard of Bangladesh to establish a shipyard at Fatullah, Narayanganj. By the 2000s, several more private shipyards were established and in 2008, Bangladesh became a ship exporting country.

== Industry ==
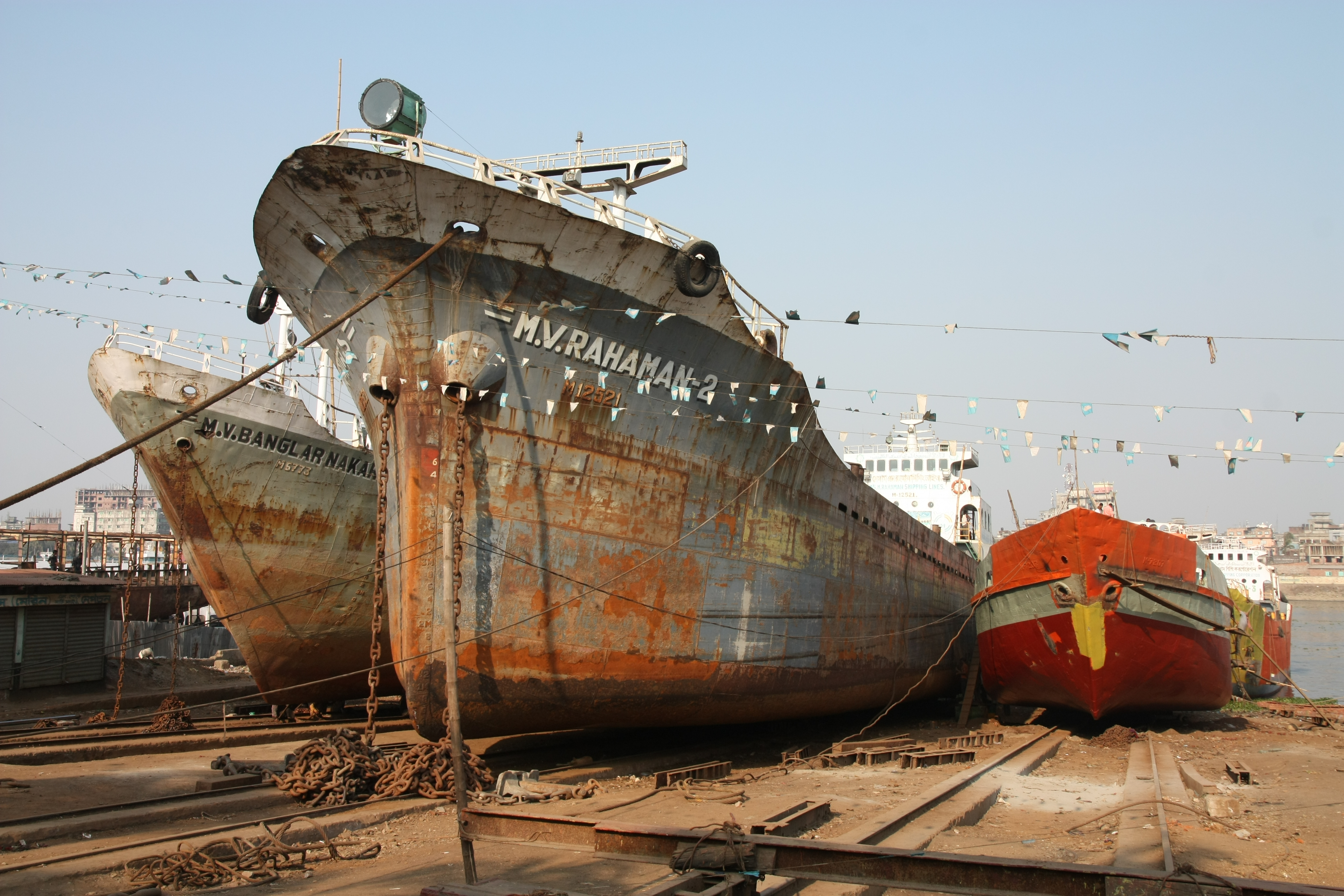
Ships in shipyard at Buriganga River

Radiant Shipyard Limited (RSL), established in 2012 at Rupganj in Narayanganj, built the first LPG carrier constructed in Bangladesh. The vessel, the Omera Princess, was handed over to Omera Petroleum in November 2014 after about nine months' construction. A second carrier for the same customer, the Omera King, was laid down in 2016 at a contract price of Tk 320 million, about half the cost of an equivalent vessel sourced from abroad. According to the company, its technical team was led by its technical director, Syed Ashraful Karim. The yard also builds coastal oil tankers, tugs and pontoons, and has carried out work for government bodies including the Bangladesh Inland Water Transport Authority and the Mongla Port Authority, some of it under World Bank-financed projects.

Ananda Shipyard and Shipways Limited (ASSL), founded in 1983 on the bank of Meghna river, became the first Bangladeshi shipbuilding company to export an ocean-going ship when it transferred the locally built "Stella Maris" to a Danish firm. ASSL has since then secured several more contracts, mostly from the European countries.

Western Marine Shipyard is another company, based in Chittagong, which has secured many export contracts.

There is also another shipbuilding company and they have the third largest shipyard in Bangladesh and it is situated on the Meghna river.The company's name is Khan Brothers Shipbuilding Limited.

FMC Dockyard Limited is one of the most renowned name in Bangladeshi shipbuilding industry. This is the only Dockyard of Bangladesh, which has its own forward and backward linkage facilities.

The potentials of shipbuilding in Bangladesh has made the country to be compared with countries like China, Japan and South Korea. Referring to the growing amount of export deals secured by the shipbuilding companies as well as the low cost labor available in the country, experts suggest that Bangladesh could emerge as a major competitor in the global market of small to medium ocean-going vessels.
