= ASSL =

ASSL, assl, or variant, may refer to:

Companies and divisions

- Ananda Shipyard and Shipways Limited (ASSL)
- Antonin Scalia School of Law

Computing

- Agglomerated SSL (assl), a fork of Open SSL, see OpenSSL#assl
- Autonomic System Specification Language, see Autonomic computing

Other

- Annual Status of Student Learning, a study in India carried out by Educational Initiatives
