= Ananda Shipyard & Slipways Limited =

Bangladeshi shipbuilding company

Ananda Shipyards and Slipways is a Bangladeshi shipbuilding company, founded in 1983. It is a part of the Ananda Group of companies.

Ananda Shipyards, along with Western Marine Shipyard, is one of two major exporters of ships from Bangladesh. It was the first Bangladeshi shipbuilding company to deliver a seagoing vessel to a foreign customer, the Stilla Marriage which was delivered to a customer in Denmark. As of November 2008 the company had received orders worth $373 million from European and African buyers for building 34 vessels.

In 2022, the shipyard exported the largest domestically produced vessel ever exported from Bangladesh, a 6,100 deadweight tonnage (dwt) oceangoing container vessel sold to a UK buyer, Enzian Shipping Company Ltd.

== Controversy ==
After winning a large number of bids in the late 2000s, the company succumbed to the global recession and failed to deliver orders on-time to many customers. This led to a call on performance bonds covering the company's projects. Indemnified losses exceeded $58m, and led to questions being raised by regulators about the banks that issued bonds and loans to the company.

The shipyard has been accused of illegally occupying shore areas along the Meghna River.

== Delivered ships ==
- 6 ferries and boats to the Mozambique government.

== See also ==
- Shipbuilding in Bangladesh
- Radiant Shipyard Limited
- List of companies of Bangladesh
