= FMC Dockyard Limited =

Bangladeshi ship-related company

- Native name: এফএমসি ডকইয়ার্ড লিমিটেড
- Company type: Shipbuilding; Ship engineering
- Founded: 2009
- Headquarters: FMC House, East Nasirabad, Chittagong, Bangladesh
- Area served: UAE, Canada, Oman, India, Turkey, Singapore, Bangladesh, China
- Key people: Mohammad Yasin Chowdhury (Chairman)
- Products: Shipbuilding; Offshore Engineering; Industrial Plant & Engineering; Ship Repair & Maintenance; Dry Docking; Dredger Manufacturing & Dredging; Marine & Industrial Paint
- Number of employees: 1500+(2018)
- Parent: FMC Group of Companies
- Website: fmcdockyard.com

FMC Dockyard Limited (Bengali: এফএমসি ডকইয়ার্ড লিমিটেড) is a shipbuilding & ship-repairing company based in Chittagong, Bangladesh owned by the FMC Group. The shipyard constructs various types of vessels, including ocean going multi purpose cargo vessels, passenger vessels & boats, oil tankers, pontoons, barges, fishing trawlers, dredgers, tug boats, container vessels, etc. FMC Dockyard is Situated in the Eastern Bank of the Karnaphuli river in Chittagong, it is an employment source for around 1500+ people; including skilled and semi skilled labors. FMC Dockyard is standing with over 45 acres of land, modernized into a shipyard consisting of all sorts of tech & heavy machinery. More than five hundred marine professionals are also working in the shipyard. Including marine experts, mechanical engineers, electrical engineers, naval architects & experts in other fields. Business strategy of FMC Dockyard is "Diversity for growth and innovation".

== History ==
FMC Dockyard Limited was established in 2009 as a shipbuilding company. FMC Dockyard is the mother company of FMC Group. It is now the largest shipyard of Bangladesh with total areas of 45-acre premises and it is the only dockyard of Bangladesh, which has its own forward and backward linkage industry. More than five hundred marine professionals are also working in the shipyard. Including marine experts, mechanical engineers, electrical engineers, naval architects and experts in other fields. Shipbuilding capacities up to 15,000 DWTShip repair capacities up to 30,000 DWT. With necessity of continuous and effective vessels' operation, it is essential to keep their performance at peak. For this purpose, FMC Dockyard provides various maintenance services which will optimize vessel's efficiency and reduce operating costs. FMC Dockyard offers technical support and assistance in drawing up and managing maintenance programmes. Mohammad Yasin Chowdhury is the current chairman of FMC Group of companies.

== Dockyard facilities ==
FMC Dockyard utilizes workshops, logistical resources, and equipment for the building of their ships. The yard stands over 45 acres of land, and employs a workforce of over 1500+ all together.

Some of the facilities of FMC Dockyard are following :

- In house Oxygen plant
- Bonded warehouse
- Heavy lifting equipment
  - Gantry crane
  - Mobile hydraulic crane
  - Barge mounted crane
  - Dormitory
- Bending shop
- Blasting shop
- CNC (Computer Numerical Control) shop
- Mechanical and Carpentry shop
- Fabrication yard and shed
- Painting shop
- Slipway
- Healthcare facilities

== Projects ==
FMC Dockyard has built more than 60 ships which includes ocean going multi purpose cargo vessels, passenger vessels & boats, oil tankers, barges, fishing trawlers, dredgers, tug boats, container vessels, ferry and more.

Few of FMC Dockyard's Completed Projects
Projects Name	Types	Specification	Client
Jarip-11	Modern Hydrographic survey vessel	Hull : Steel hull Dimension : 22m X 5.6m X 2.86m Classification : RINA Year of Delivery : 2015	Chittagong Port Authority
KUSHUM KOLI	Passenger Ferry	Hull : Steel hull Dimension : 43.61m X 12.2m X 2.44m Capacity : 110 Passenger + 30 Vehicles Year of Delivery : 2015	Bangladesh Inland Water Transport Corporation
FV JAS FISHER FV AMUSE NOUSHIN FV SORNALI OPE FV CML LABIBA	Fishing trawler	Dimension : 41.0m × 9.0m × 4.90m Classification : Mercantile Marine Department (MMD) Capacity : 280 Tons	The Bismillah Marine Service Amuse Deep Sea Fishing Ltd. Sarnali International Ltd. Apon Import Centre Ltd.
M.T ABU SADIQUE M.T CASCADE M.T OME M.T WAVE-1 M.T ARJU	Oil tanker	Hull : Steel hull (Double hull-Double bottom) Dimension : 74.00m × 11.00m × 5.00m Classification : RINA Capacity : 1560 DWT	M/S Amuse Marine Services M/S N J Environ Tech M/S AFI Oil and Shipping M/S RAKA ENTERPRISE M/S A T Corporation
M.T. SEA LINK UTSHAB	Oil tanker	Hull : Steel hull Dimension : 67.60m × 11.50m × 5.00m Capacity : 1600 DWT	M/S SEALINK SHIPPING CO.LTD
M.T. Z.N-01	Oil tanker	Hull : Steel hull Dimension : 74.00m × 11.00m × 5.00m Capacity : 1700 DWT	Z.N. Shipping Lines Ltd
MV MAHIRAH	Cruise Vessel	Dimension : 32m × 7.92m × 1.83m Year of Delivery : 2012	East Wood Ltd.
Ferry Dhaka Ferry Comilla	Medium Ferry	Hull : Steel hull	Bangladesh Inland Water Transport Corporation
Procurement and Replacement of Two Nos. Main Engine with gear box and ancillary works for tug boat M.T Sibsa	Tugboat	Hull : Steel hull Dimension : 31.40m × 9.15m × 5.00m Bollard pull : 30 Ton	Mongla Port Authority
Procurement (Construction and Replacement) of 45 (Forty Five) nos. medium size pontoons	Pontoon (boat)	Hull : Steel hull Dimension : 19.51m × 8.23m × 1.52m	Bangladesh Inland Water Transport Authority
Supply and Installation of 25 Pontoons and Gangways at Sundarban Forest Division	Landing Station	Type : A Hull : Steel hull Dimension : 12.2m × 4.87m × 1.53m Type : B Hull : Steel hull Dimension : 12.8m × 5.18m × 1.65m Type : C Hull : Steel hull Dimension : 15.24m × 5.18m × 1.83m	European Union
