= Chittagong Dry Dock Limited =

Shipyard of the Bangladesh Navy

- Type: State-owned
- Industry: Ship repair Steelwork; Shipbuilding (planned)
- Founded: July 1985; 41 years ago
- Headquarters: Chittagong, Bangladesh
- Key people: Mohammad Benjir Mahmud (Managing Director)
- Owner: Bangladesh Navy
- Website: www.cddl.gov.bd

Chittagong Dry Dock Limited (CDDL), formerly an enterprise of Bangladesh Steel and Engineering Corporation, is a state-owned military ship repair facility based near the Chittagong Port, Bangladesh. CDDL is one of the largest shipbuilder and repair facilities in the East and South Asian region, and one of the three shipyards owned and operated by the Bangladesh Navy.

== History ==
Chittagong Dry Dock Limited was formerly owned by Bangladesh Steel and Engineering Corporation, built to function complementary to Chittagong Port Authority. It is located in Patenga, Chittagong, Bangladesh. It was built to repair and service ships that dock in Chittagong port. On 23 December 2015, the dock was transferred to the Bangladesh Navy. In 2014 the dock started the construction of its first cargo ship. In 2015 the dry dock built a six entrance footbridge for Sylhet City.

In 2019, Chittagong Dry Dock Limited was awarded the contract to build six heavy duty offshore patrol vessels (OPVs) for the Bangladesh Navy. These ships will replace the Island-class OPVs.

== Projects ==
=== 2,000 tonnes OPV ===
Under the second phase of the FG2030 naval modernization plan, the Bangladesh Navy signed a contract with CDDL for six 2,000-tonnes offshore patrol vessels. The OPVs are intended to guard Bangladesh's exclusive economic zone (EEZ).

=== Bangladesh Navy frigate program ===
Chittagong Dry Dock has been awarded the contract to undertake the frigate program of the Bangladesh Navy. In the bid to transform from a buyer's navy to a builder's navy, the Bangladesh Navy realized its ambitious plan to introduce 6 indigenously built guided missile frigates by 2030. The frigates will incorporate stealth technology, a helicopter hangar, and state-of-the-art hardware. In 2018, Commodore Mohammad Nazmul Karim said two frigates will be commissioned in 2022, two by 2025, and two by 2030. However, as of March 2021, with the current progress, shipbuilding is likely to be delayed for several more years. Shipbuilding may be further delayed due to the COVID-19 pandemic. But, in any case, the frigate production will end before 2030.

== See also ==
- Khulna Shipyard
- Dockyard and Engineering Works Limited
- Shipbuilding in Bangladesh
- Radiant Shipyard Limited
- List of historic ships of the Bangladesh Navy
