= Gloucester Marine Railways =

Coordinates: 42.6085°N 70.6556°W

Gloucester Marine Railways (established 1859) is one of the oldest continuously operated shipyards in the U.S. And is located on the northern tip of Rocky Neck in Gloucester, Massachusetts.

Originally an extension of the Dodd & Tarr Fisheries, the railways at this site were constructed in 1859 on the northernmost tip of Rocky Neck. Up until the 1970s the marine railways used a steam engine to haul vessels, the gears of this steam engine were built at the same factory that built the motor for the USS Monitor, the Civil War battleship.

In 1874 the site was given the name "Rocky Neck Marine Railways Association" by the Tarr brothers after they took over the firm of Dodd & Tarr. The railways were used to maintain the Gloucester fishing fleet of schooners that fished the water of the Grand Banks.

Now known as Gloucester Marine Railways, the shipyard has maintained and repaired thousands of fishing, commercial, and pleasure boats. Large wooden schooners are still commonplace here. A modern Travelift has been installed but the original railways are still in operation to this day. The site was used as a location in the shooting of the 2000 film The Perfect Storm.
