= Blasting machine =

Machine used to remotely detonate an explosive

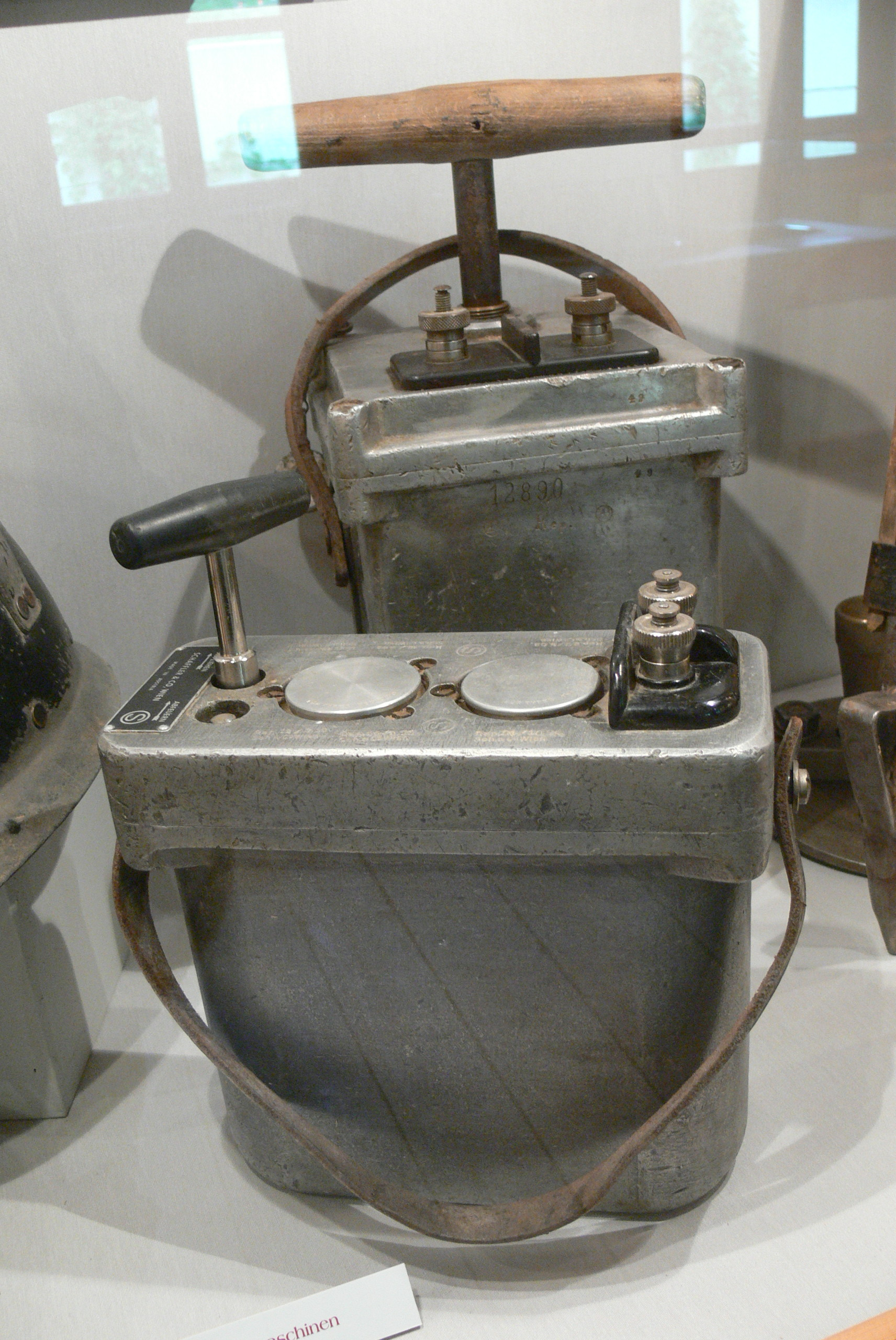
Two blasting machines. At rear is one where the trigger works by depressing or raising the handle; at fore, one where the handle is twisted

A blasting machine or shot exploder (commonly called a plunger) is a portable source of electric current to reliably fire a blasting cap to trigger a main explosive charge. It is mostly used in mining and demolition.

The use of the term "machine" dates from early designs that used an electrical generator operated by winding a rotary handle or pushing down a T-handle. Modern blasting machines are battery-powered and operated by key switches and push-buttons, and do not resemble the older designs.

== History ==
The first satisfactory magnetic induction blasting machine was constructed in 1878 by Henry Julius Smith of Mountain View, New Jersey. Its mechanism consisted of a T-handle that was pushed down; the lower end of the handle was a rack that drove a pinion, which in turn drove a high-voltage magneto, which generated the high voltage that is required to detonate the blasting cap.

== Design ==
A typical "capacitive discharge" blasting machine works by charging a capacitor from a battery, then discharging the capacitor through an external circuit, called the firing line, to fire the blasting cap. While the machine is idle, an "internal shunt" is connected across the output terminals so that any stray voltages induced in the external circuit, for example by nearby radio transmitters, are harmlessly short-circuited without triggering the blasting cap. The machines also typically include an "abort" feature to discharge the internal capacitor without firing the cap.

== In popular culture ==
Despite the older "T-Handle" design no longer being used, this design of blasting machine is most closely associated with Looney Tunes, and the character Wile E. Coyote, due to his penchant for attempting to use explosive materials to capture or incapacitate the Road Runner, often ending in disaster for the Coyote as the explosive either backfires, the machine does not work properly, or the T-handle gets stuck.
