= Rocky Neck, Gloucester =

Art colony in Gloucester, Massachusetts, U.S.

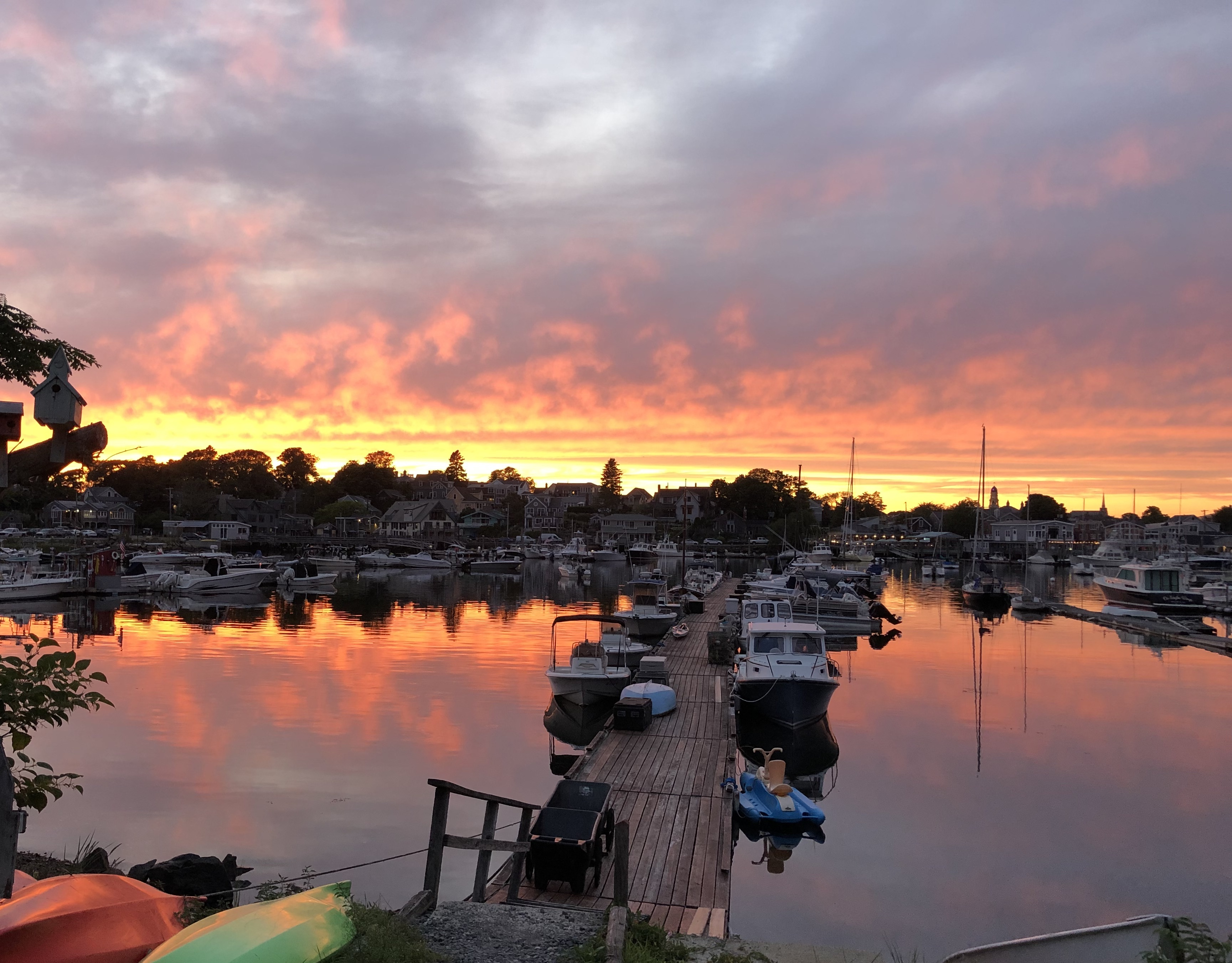
Sunset at Rocky Neck, Smith Cove

Rocky Neck is one of the oldest continuously operating art colonies in the United States. Located on a rocky peninsula within Gloucester's working harbor, Rocky Neck is known for its quaint neighborhood, geographic beauty and many art galleries and studios.

Artists including Winslow Homer, Edward Hopper, and many others working on Rocky Neck in the 19th and early 20th centuries inspired the Cape Ann style of American Impressionism. Artists still work and display their art in the many Rocky Neck galleries during the summer months. It was also frequented by well-known writers such as Louisa May Alcott and Rudyard Kipling. Judith A. Curtis published a book titled Rocky Neck Art Colony 1850–1950 which features more than 130 photos of artwork, artists and the location, and was designed by Stephen Bridges, in 2015. Rock Neck Art Colony published an informative newsletter.

Gloucester Marine Railways, located at the very end of Rocky Neck, was established in 1859, making it one of the oldest working shipyards in the country.

The Rocky Neck area was listed on the National Register of Historic Places in 2017.

Rocky Neck Art Colony (RNAC) continues to accept members. The organization’s website hosts information and registration on RNAC memberships.
