= Radiant Shipyard =

Bangladeshi shipbuilding company

Coordinates: 23.8776°N 90.5730°E

Radiant Shipyard Limited
- Type: Private
- Industry: Shipbuilding
- Founded: 2012; 14 years ago
- Headquarters: Daudpur, Rupganj, Narayanganj District, Bangladesh
- Key people: A.K.M. Alauddin (Managing Director), Syed Ashraful Karim (Technical Director)
- Products: LPG carriers, oil tankers, barges, tugboats
- Parent: Radiant Group
- Website: rsl.org.bd

Radiant Shipyard Limited is a shipbuilding company in Bangladesh, based at Daudpur in Rupganj, Narayanganj District. It was established in 2012 to build vessels for Bangladeshi owners who had previously ordered ships from China, Thailand and South Korea. In 2014 the yard delivered the Omera Princess, reported at the time as the first LPG carrier built in Bangladesh.

== History ==
Radiant Shipyard was established in 2012. In April 2014 it launched its first two coastal oil tankers, each of 1,750 cubic metres capacity, built over 14 months for Cargo Maritime. The vessels were moved from the building site into the water using the air-bag method, one of the first such launches in Bangladesh. By that time the yard had also built a cruise vessel for tourism in the Sundarbans and had signed contracts with Atlas Shipping and MST Marine Services for two inland container vessels.

Vessel designs for the yard are produced by Radiant Marine Design and Services, an associated naval architecture firm.

=== LPG carriers ===
In February 2014 Radiant Shipyard was commissioned by Omera Petroleum, a subsidiary of MJL Bangladesh, to build a 300-tonne LPG carrier. The vessel, named Omera Princess, was completed in about nine months and handed over in November 2014. It measures 58.6 metres in length with a beam of 10.2 metres and a draught of 3.5 metres. Contemporary reports described it as the first LPG carrier built in Bangladesh.

In October 2016 the keel was laid for a second LPG carrier for the same customer, the Omera King, with a capacity of 350 tonnes. At 63 metres long and 10 metres in beam, it was designed for a maximum speed of 12 knots using two Yanmar engines, with three Volvo Penta generators. The vessel was contracted at Tk 320 million; according to the shipyard, an equivalent vessel sourced from abroad would have cost about Tk 700 million. At the same time the yard was building three LPG cylinder-carrying vessels, each with a capacity of 3,000 cylinders, for Energypac Power Generation.

The yard subsequently built further coastal LPG carriers, including MT Petromax-5, delivered in 2020, and vessels for Bashundhara LP Gas.

=== Government contracts ===
In May 2022 the Bangladeshi government's Cabinet Committee on Government Purchase approved a contract worth Tk 409 million with Radiant Shipyard under a waste management project at Mongla Port. The following month a keel-laying ceremony was held at the yard for four vessels for the Mongla Port Authority — a self-propelled barge, a tug, a pontoon and a dump barge — procured under lot 2 of package G-1 of the 'Modern Waste and Exhaust Oil Management at Mongla Port' project. The ceremony was attended by the Mongla Port Authority chairman, Rear Admiral Mohammad Musa, and the shipyard's managing director, A. K. M. Alauddin.

== Facilities ==
The shipyard is located on the Shitalakshya River at Daudpur in Rupganj, Narayanganj. It is one of a number of shipyards concentrated along the rivers around Dhaka and Narayanganj, which together account for roughly 70 per cent of Bangladesh's shipbuilding capacity.

== See also ==
- Shipbuilding in Bangladesh
